= Ogi (meteorite) =

Meteorite

- Type: Chondrite
- Class: Ordinary Chondrite
- Group: H6
- Country: Japan
- Coordinates: 33°30′N 130°20′E
- Observed fall: Yes
- Fall date: 8 June 1741
- TKW: 14.36 kg
- Alternative names: Hizen

The Ogi meteorite fell in 1741 near the present day city of Ogi in the central part of Saga Prefecture on the island of Kyushu, in Japan. Four stones with masses of roughly 5.6 kg, 4.6 kg, 2 kg, and 2 kg were recovered after the observed fall. The stoney meteorite is classified as an ordinary chondrite of the H6-group.

With a total recovered mass of 14.36 kg it is among the seven heaviest meteorites ever found in Japan. It is the fourth oldest meteorite with an observed fall in Japan and together with the meteorites of Nōgata, Minamino and Sasagase it is among the 10 oldest meteorite falls in the world where specimens are still preserved.

The reason meteorites that fell in Japan before the 18th century were often preserved is connected to the population's faith and the fact that they were kept in custody at shrines and temples as revered sacred objects.

The fall of the meteorite is documented in local sources from the Edo period. While both of the smaller stones were lost, the two larger stones remained in the hands of the ruling Nabeshima family for generations as temple objects and family heirloom.

The 4.6 kg stone was given to the British Museum of Natural History in the 19th century. The 5.6 kg main mass was believed lost since World War II until it resurfaced in 2025.

== History ==
=== Fall and recovery ===
On June 8, 1741, at roughly 11 a.m., thunder-like sounds were witnessed as a meteoroid passed through the atmosphere above the island of Kyushu and fell near Ogi. At the time of the fall, the Ogi area was part of the Ogi Domain and the meteorite fall occurred during the reign of Nabeshima Naohide, the fifth daimyō of that domain.

An entry into the Edo period administrative diary of the Ogi Domain (Ogi-han Nikki) describes the fall of the meteorite: "From Sakuraoka, toward the direction of north-northeast, a sound like thunder was heard; stones fell in various places."

Pieces of the meteorite were recovered by the Ogi Domain. The two larger fragments were preserved, while the two smaller ones remain undocumented, leaving their whereabouts unknown.

=== Religious tradition ===
For more than 100 years, the meteorites were kept at a Nabeshima family temple in Ogi. According to the family archives, the stones were entrusted to a priest named Jishobo in December 1744. Preserved at a temple in Ogi, they were treated as sacred objects.

Because the extraterrestrial origin of meteorites was not yet widely accepted at the time, local tradition explained the fall in mythic terms. In local tradition, the stones were associated with Shokujo (also known in some sources as Tanabata-tsume), a weaver goddess linked to the “Heavenly River” (Milky Way) motif in Japanese star-festival lore. The belief was that the stones had fallen from the banks of the Heavenly River after they had been used by the goddess as weights to steady her loom. A Tanabata festival held on the seventh day of the seventh month was an annual tradition. On this day, members of the public could venerate the meteorite stones.

=== Preservation ===
After the Meiji Restoration the temple was closed and the meteorites were returned to the possession of Naotaro Nabeshima, who was the 11th and final daimyō of the Saga Domain. The meteorites were preserved by the Nabeshima family and were eventually transported from Saga to Tokyo.

In 1882, the two specimens were studied by Edward Divers, a British chemist working at the Imperial College of Engineering in Tokyo. He published the first description of the chemical composition of the meteorite in 1882. Around that time, the smaller 4.6 kg fragment was given to the British Museum of Natural History by Naotora Nabeshima at the request of British diplomat Harry Parkes. Over the years pieces of that meteorite have been distributed to researchers and museums around the world, while the majority of the mass remained in London.

The 5.6 kg meteorite was kept by the Nabeshima family in Tokyo, but had been missing since the Nabeshima residence in Tokyo was damaged in an air raid during World War II. However, on September 9, 2025, in a TV-production by TV Tokyo called "Kaiun! Nandemo Kanteidan", it was presented along with related documents.

== Classification ==
Ogi is classified as an H6 ordinary chondrite. H chondrites are stony meteorites characterized by relatively high metallic iron content, while the petrologic type 6 indicates substantial thermal metamorphism on the parent body of the meteorite.
