= Mbosi =

Mbosi may refer to:

- Mbosi meteorite, a large iron meteorite found in Tanzania.
- Mbosi language, a Bantu language
- Mbosi people, the speakers of the Mbosi language in the Republic of Congo.

== See also ==
- Mbozi (disambiguation)
