= Aletai meteorite =

Very large iron meteorite from Altay prefecture in Northern Xinjiang, China

Aletai
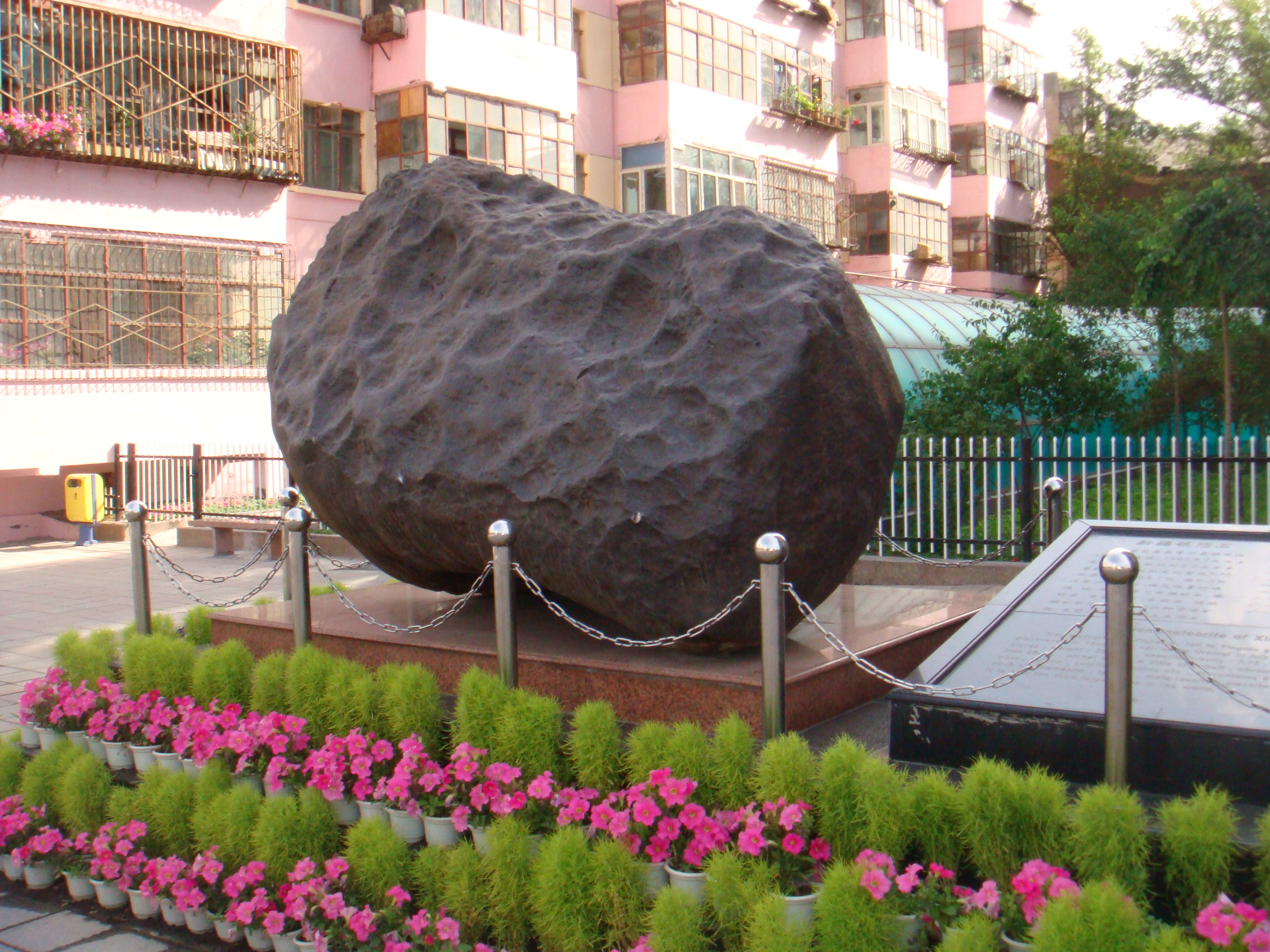
- The Armanty fragment in front of the Xinjiang Geological and Mineral Museum in Ürümqi.
- Type: Iron
- Structural classification: Coarse octahedrite
- Group: IIIE-an
- Composition: 9.8% Ni, 0.52% Co, 109 ppm Cu, 16.9 ppm Ga, 14.4 ppm As, 1.81 ppm Au, 0.228 ppm Ir (Note: Data for Armanty fragment.)
- Country: China
- Region: Xinjiang
- Coordinates: 45°52′16″N 90°30′17″E
- Observed fall: No
- Found date: 1898
- TKW: ~74,500 kg
- Strewn field: Yes
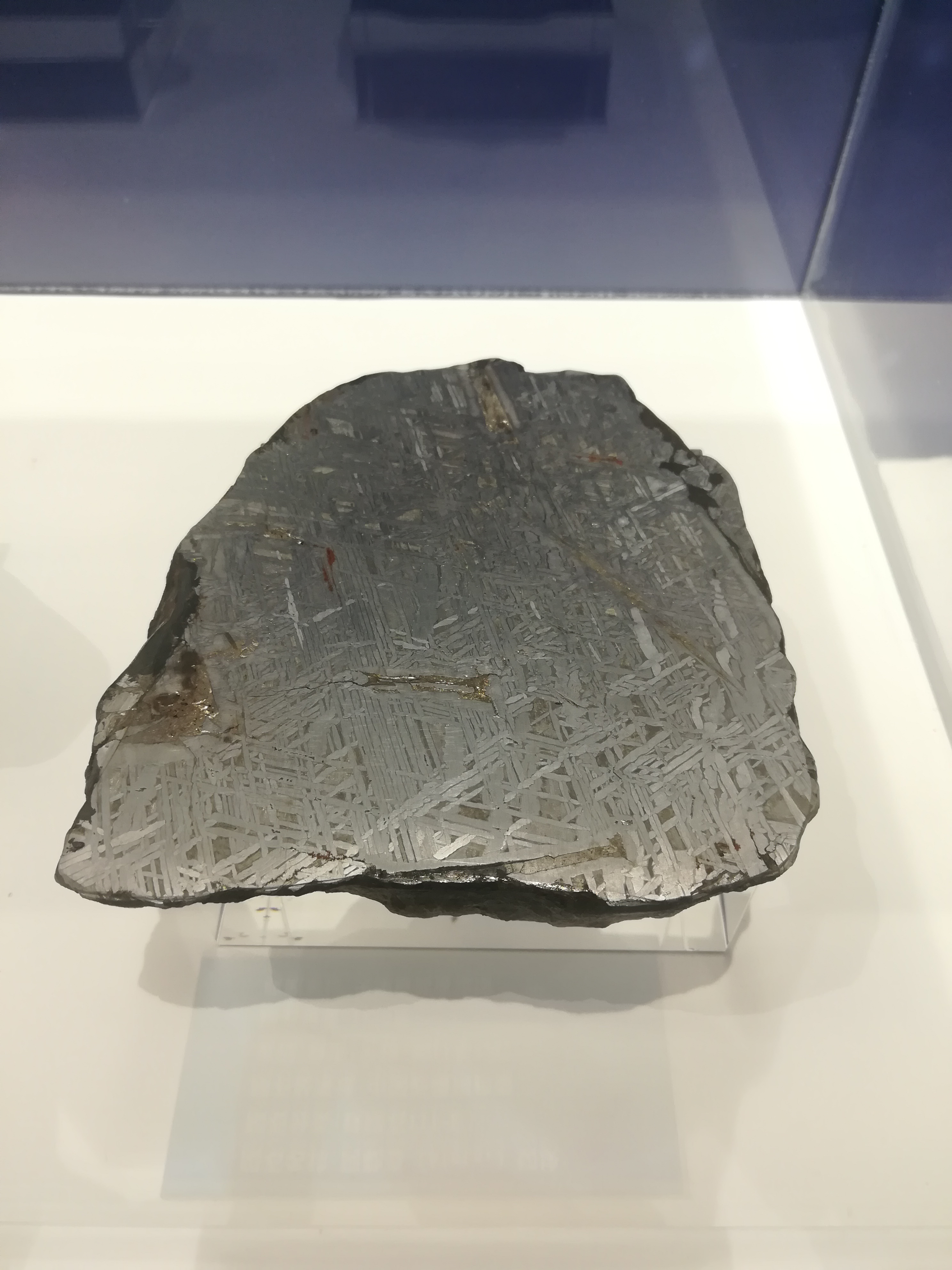
- A small fragment of the Aletai meteorite with visible Widmanstätten patterns on display at the Tianjin Natural History Museum.
- Related media on Wikimedia Commons

The Aletai meteorite, previously also known as the Armanty meteorite or Xinjiang meteorite, is one of the largest known iron meteorites, classified as a coarse octahedrite in chemical group IIIE-an. (Note: An iron meteorite belonging to chemical group IIIE with anomalous properties.) In addition to many small fragments, at least five main fragments with a total mass over 74 tonnes have been recovered, the largest weighing about 28 tonnes.

Among the irons of the Aletai meteorite, three pieces can be distinguished, which at the moment apparently occupy the 5th, 6th and 9th places among the largest meteorites found on Earth. The corresponding strewn field along its long axis is at least 430 km (and presumably even larger). It is by a margin the largest meteorite debris scattering field found on the planet, believed to be due to its unique stone skipping-like trajectory.

No historical records of the fall exist, so its impact time is likely prehistoric.

== Name ==
For over a century after its discovery in 1898, the meteorite was known only from one fragment, and this fragment was assumed to be a single meteorite. Its name was Armanty in the original Russian reports and Western sources, but Xinjiang in Chinese literature. In the early 21st century, with the discovery of other fragments, initially also thought to be separate, unconnected meteorites with their individual names, it finally became clear that they were all most likely part of a once single, larger body. And in 2016 the parent meteorite was named the Aletai meteorite after the Altay Prefecture in Northern Xinjiang where fragments were found. The prefecture, in turn, was named after the Altai Mountains. Since then when referring generally to the irons, authors should use the name Aletai. When referring to a specific mass, authors should identify it as, for example, the "Armanty mass of Aletai" or the "Akebulake mass of Aletai". The list of recommended mass names for Aletai appears in the table below.

== History ==
The first and the largest fragment, Armanty, was discovered in 1898. In 1965, it was transported to the city of Urumqi and is now located in front of the entrance to the local museum. Until the beginning of the 21st century, this fragment was considered an individual meteorite. In 2004, a second fragment was found about 130 kilometers southeast of the Armanti discovery site during fieldwork by geologist Xiaodong Li, which was dubbed the Ulasitai iron. The third, relatively small mass was purchased from an anonymous finder, with the find supposedly made in April 2005. In 2011, Akebulake and Wuxilike, two other very large fragments were found. And finally, in 2021, another one (WuQilike). In the process of discovering the fragments, comparing their chemical composition and structure, it became clear that they are parts of a once single entity.

In February 2026, an additional 2.5 ton fragment, allegedly part of the Aletai meteorite, was stopped by Russian customs in the port of Saint Petersburg.

== Specimens ==
Known fragments of the Aletai meteorite
Name	Year of discovery	Location	Mass, kg
Armanty	1898	45°52′16″N 90°30′17″E	28,000
WuQilike	2021	48°02′17″N 88°23′03″E	23,000
Akebulake	2011	48°06′15″N 88°16′34″E	18,000
Wuxilike (Note: Was given the provisional name Xinjiang 008.)	2011	48°03′08″N 88°22′19″E	5,000
Ulasitai (Note: Published in Meteoritical Bulletin 90 as a distinct meteorite.)	2004	44°57′24″N 91°24′09″E	430
Xinjiang (b) (Note: Published as a distinct IIIAB iron in Meteoritical Bulletin 104.)	2005	47°58′42″N 88°13′06″E	35
(unnamed) (Note: Found in the Xiaodonggou region close to the place where Wuxilike and Akebulake were found.)	?	48°04′42″N 88°19′27″E (Note: Unnamed 15 kg of mass that was found in the Xiaodonggou area close to Wuxilike and Akebulake without precise latitude and longitude. Its coordinates are given for the middle between Wuxilike and Akebulake.)	15
Total:			74,480

== Composition and classification ==
It is an iron meteorite (coarse octahedrite) and belongs to the very rare chemical group IIIE-an (i.e. chemical group IIIE with anomalous properties). At present, only two meteorites fall into this group. Different from other IIIE members, Aletai irons are characterized by higher Au and Co contents and unexcepted Ir contents that do not fall on extrapolation of the Au-Ir trend of the other IIIE irons. Overall, by combining geochemical data with petrologic observations, we concur with the conclusion of Meteoritical Bulletin 105 that Aletai is an anomalous IIIE iron. The composition of Aletai irons is so unique that no other samples in the world meteorite collection are comparable. The Ulasitai meteorite consists mainly of kamacite (76 vol%), taenite (10 vol%), and plessite (10.6 vol%) with less abundant schreibersite (3.4 vol%) and minor troilite, cohenite, and daubréelite. The Widmanstätten pattern has bandwidths of kamacite in a range of 0.9–1.8 mm and an average of 1.2 ± 0.2 mm. Schreibersite mainly occurs as coarse laths with sizes up to 1.2 mm wide and 8.9 mm long observed on the etched polished sections. Small grains of schreibersite (normally <20 μm thin) were also found along grain boundaries of kamacite, taenite, and sulfides, and inside of plessite. Akebulake and WuQilike in turn consist mainly of kamacite (~80 to 83 volume %), taenite (~10 to 11 volume %), plessite (~3 to 8 volume %), and schreibersite (~2 to 3 volume %) with minor troilite, haxonite, and daubréelite. Kamacite plates display a medium-sized Widmanstätten pattern with a bandwidth of ~1 to 1.4 mm. Similarity of chemical composition and internal structure and unique ratio of rare elements strongly suggest that all the Aletai masses are from the same fall event.

== See also ==
- List of largest meteorites on Earth
- Meteoric iron
