= List of largest meteorites on Earth =

This is a list of largest meteorites on Earth. Size can be assessed by the largest fragment of a given meteorite or the total amount of material coming from the same meteorite fall: often a single meteoroid during atmospheric entry tends to fragment into more pieces.

The table lists the largest meteorites found on the Earth's surface.

== Iron ==
N°	Meteorite name	Found year	Region/Country	Coordinates	Group	Classification	Mass	Image
1	Hoba	1920	Grootfontein, Namibia	19°35′33″S 17°56′01″E (Note: Coordinates were verified using satellite images.)	Ataxite	IVB	60,000 kg (130,000 lb)	
2	Cape York (Ahnighito)	1894	Meteorite Island, Greenland	76°03′35″N 64°55′20″W	Octahedrite	IIIAB	30,880 kg (68,080 lb)	
3	Campo del Cielo (Gancedo)	2016	Chaco, Argentina	27°37′01″S 61°38′22″W	Octahedrite	IAB	30,800 kg (67,900 lb)	
4	Campo del Cielo (El Chaco)	1969	Chaco, Argentina	27°36′37″S 61°40′53″W	Octahedrite	IAB	28,840 kg (63,580 lb)	
5	Aletai (Armanty)	1898	Xinjiang, China	45°52′16″N 90°30′17″E	Octahedrite	IIIE-an	28,000 kg (62,000 lb)	
6	Aletai (WuQilike)	2021	Xinjiang, China	48°02′17″N 88°23′03″E	Octahedrite	IIIE-an	23,000 kg (51,000 lb)	
7	Bacubirito	1863	Sinaloa, Mexico	26°12′N 107°50′W	Octahedrite	UNG	22,000 kg (49,000 lb)	
8	Cape York (Agpalilik)	1963	Nordgrønland, Greenland	76°09′N 65°10′W	Octahedrite	IIIAB	20,140 kg (44,400 lb)	
9	Aletai (Akebulake)	2011	Xinjiang, China	48°06′15″N 88°16′34″E	Octahedrite	IIIE-an	18,000 kg (40,000 lb)	
10	Mbosi	1930	Mbeya, Tanzania	09°06′28″S 33°02′15″E	Octahedrite	UNG	16,000 kg (35,000 lb)	
11	El Ali	2020	Hiran, Somalia	04°17′17″N 44°53′54″E	Octahedrite	IAB Complex	15,150 kg (33,400 lb)	
12	Campo del Cielo (La Sorpresa)	2005	Chaco, Argentina	27°38′18″S 61°42′04″W	Octahedrite	IAB	14,850 kg (32,740 lb)	
13	Willamette	1902	Oregon, United States	45°22′N 122°35′W	Octahedrite	IIIAB	14,150 kg (31,200 lb)	
14	Chupaderos I	1852	Chihuahua, Mexico	27°00′N 105°06′W	Octahedrite	IIIAB	14,114 kg (31,116 lb)	
15	Mundrabilla I	1911	Western Australia, Australia	30°47′S 127°33′E	Octahedrite	IAB	12,400 kg (27,300 lb)	
16	Morito	1600	Chihuahua, Mexico	27°03′N 105°26′W	Octahedrite	IIIAB	10,100 kg (22,300 lb)	
17	Santa Catharina	1875	Santa Catarina, Brazil	26°13′S 48°36′W	Ataxite	IAB	7,000 kg (15,000 lb)	
18	Chupaderos II	1852	Chihuahua, Mexico	27°00′N 105°06′W	Octahedrite	IIIAB	6,770 kg (14,930 lb)	
19	Mundrabilla II	1911	Western Australia, Australia	30°47′S 127°33′E	Octahedrite	IAB	6,100 kg (13,400 lb)	
20	Bendegó	1784	Bahia, Brazil	10°07′01″S 39°15′41″W	Octahedrite	IC	5,260 kg (11,600 lb)	

== Stony-Iron ==
N°	Meteorite name	Found year	Region/Country	Coordinates	Group	Classification	TKW	Fall observed	Image
1	Seymchan	1967	Magadan Oblast, Russia	62°54′00″N 152°25′48″E	Pallasite	PMG	20,000 kg (44,000 lb) (Note: The first two fragments of the Seymchan meteorite were discovered in 1967. At that time, the meteorite was classified as a group IIE iron meteorite. In 2004, new fragments were found that included olivine crystals. In 2007, the identity of the metal in the old and new masses was proven and, accordingly, Seymchan was reclassified as a main group palassite. Many more fragments were later found. There is no exact, up-to-date information about TKW of the Seymchan meteorite. The largest fragment (in the picture) weighs approximately 1,500 kg. It is currently on display at the Moscow Planetarium.)	No	
2	Brenham	1882	Kansas, United States	37°34′57″N 99°09′49″W	Pallasite	PMG	4,300 kg (9,500 lb)	No	
3	Vaca Muerta	1861	Antofagasta, Chile	25°45′S 70°30′W	Mesosiderite	A1	3,830 kg (8,440 lb)	No	
4	Huckitta	1924	Northern Territory, Australia	22°22′S 135°46′E	Pallasite	PMG	2,300 kg (5,100 lb)	No	
5	Fukang	2000	Xinjiang, China	44°25′48″N 87°37′48″E	Pallasite	PMG	1,003 kg (2,211 lb)	No	
6	Imilac	1822	Antofagasta, Chile	24°12′12″S 68°48′24″W	Pallasite	PMG	920 kg (2,030 lb)	No	
7	Bondoc	1956	Southern Tagalog, Philippines	13°31′N 122°27′E	Mesosiderite	B4	888.60 kg (1,959.0 lb)	No	
8	Brahin	1810	Gomel', Belarus	52°30′00″N 30°19′48″E	Pallasite	PMG	823 kg (1,814 lb)	No	
9	Esquel	1951	Chubut, Argentina	42°54′00″S 71°19′48″W	Pallasite	PMG	755 kg (1,664 lb)	No	
10	Krasnojarsk	1749	Krasnoyarsky Krai, Russia	54°54′N 91°48′E	Pallasite	PMG	700 kg (1,500 lb)	No	
11	Jepara	2008	Jawa Tengah, Indonesia	06°36′S 110°44′E	Pallasite	PMG	499.5 kg (1,101 lb)	No	
12	Estherville	1879	Iowa, United States	43°25′N 94°50′W	Mesosiderite	A3/4	320 kg (710 lb)	Yes	
13	Omolon	1981	Magadan Oblast, Russia	64°01′12″N 161°48′30″E	Pallasite	PMG	250 kg (550 lb)	Yes	
14	Youxi	2006	Fujian, China	23°03′36″N 118°00′36″E	Pallasite	PMG	218 kg (481 lb)	No	
15	Pallasovka	1990	Volgograd Oblast, Russia	49°52′00″N 46°36′42″E	Pallasite	PMG	198 kg (437 lb)	No	

== See also ==
- Glossary of meteoritics
- List of individual rocks

== Bibliography ==
- Buchwald, Vagn F. (1975a). Handbook of Iron Meteorites. Their History, Distribution, Composition and Structure. Vol. 2: Iron Meteorites: Abakan - Mejillones. University of California Press. ISBN 0-520-02934-8.
- Buchwald, Vagn F. (1975b). Handbook of Iron Meteorites. Their History, Distribution, Composition and Structure. Vol. 3: Iron Meteorites: Merceditas - Zerhamra. Supplement. University of California Press. ISBN 0-520-02934-8.
