= Hadley Rille meteorite =

Meteorite on the Moon

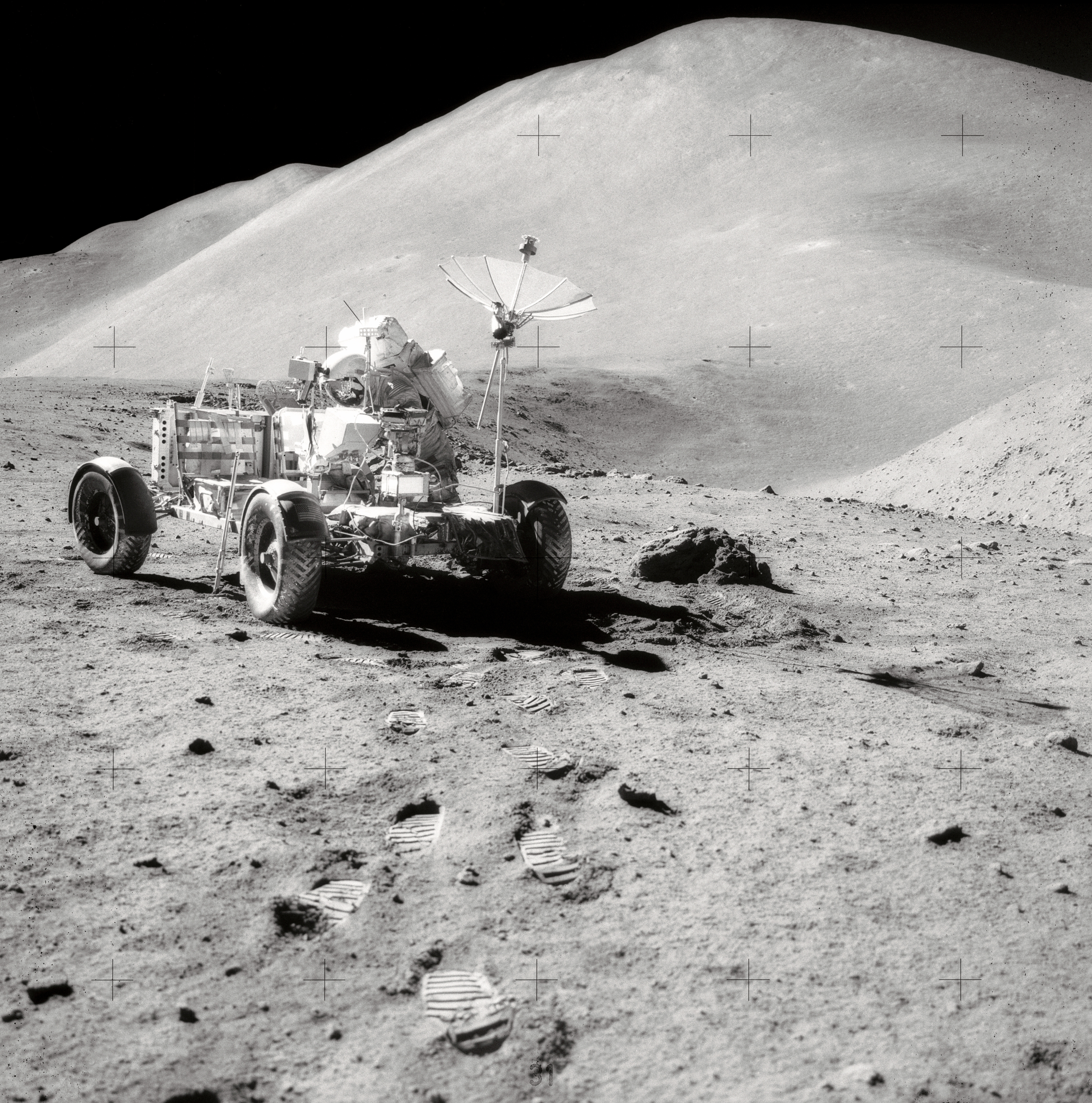
- David R. Scott, Commander of Apollo 15 near the Hadley Rille (on the right). The Hadley Rille meteorite was found within a soil sample collected during this mission. The large rock in the photograph is not the meteorite.
- Type: Chondrite
- Class: Enstatite chondrite
- Clan: EH-EL
- Group: EH
- Country: Earth's Moon
- Region: Hadley Rille
- Coordinates: 26°26′00″N 03°39′20″E
- Observed fall: No
- Found date: 1971
- TKW: 3 milligrams (0.00011 oz)

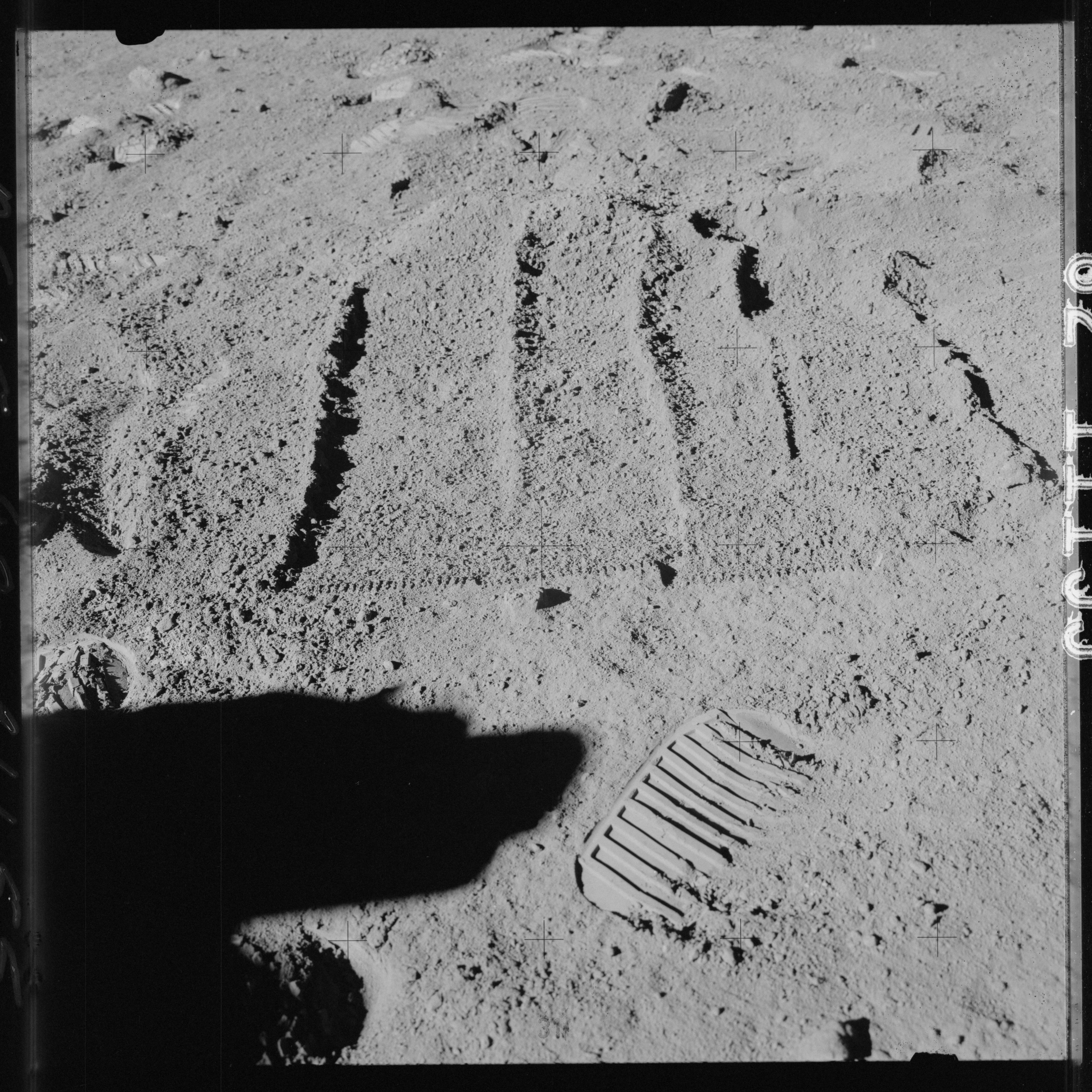
Samples 15600 to 15689 were collected using a rake tool, which was dragged along the surface to collect fragments in an unbiased way from the lunar regolith. This photo was taken after the rake sample was collected. The Hadley Rille Meteorite was one of many samples collected with the rake from this location.

The Hadley Rille meteorite was a meteorite discovered on the Moon at coordinates 26° 26' 0" N, 3° 39' 20" E, or Station 9A, during the Apollo 15 mission in 1971. It was the second meteorite to be discovered on a Solar System body other than the Earth. The first was the Bench Crater meteorite, discovered in 1969 during the Apollo 12 mission.

== Characteristics ==
Within the soil sample 15602,29 collected near Hadley Rille was found an object in the 1–2 millimetres (0.039–0.079 in) size. The Hadley Rille meteorite massed about 3 milligrams (0.046 gr) and contained enstatite, kamacite, niningerite, silica, schreibersite, troilite, albite, and daubréelite. It is classed as an enstatite chondrite (EH) by the Meteoritical Society.

== See also ==
- Glossary of meteoritics
- Bench Crater meteorite
- Big Bertha (lunar sample)
- Hadley–Apennine (Moon)
- Heat Shield Rock (Mars – Meridiani Planum meteorite)
- List of Martian meteorites
- List of meteorites on Mars
