= Mbozi =

Mbozi may refer to:

- Mbozi District, Tanzania
- Mbozi Languages, a group of languages in Zambia and Tanzania

== See also ==
- Mbosi
