= Bacubirito meteorite =

Iron meteorite which landed in Sinaloa, Mexico

Bacubirito
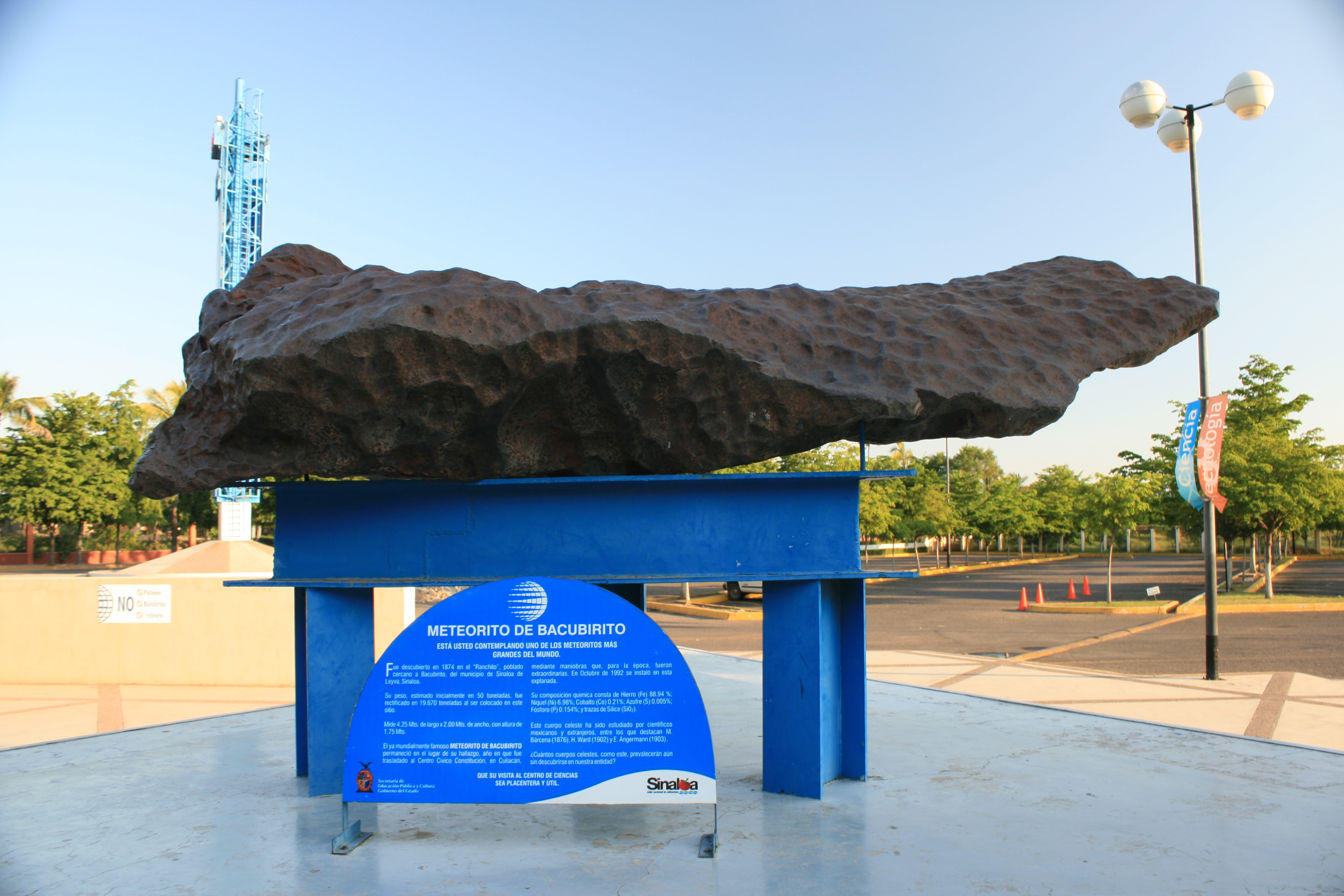
- The Bacubirito meteorite at the Centro de Ciencias de Sinaloa
- Type: Iron
- Composition: 88.94% Fe, 6.98% Ni, 0.21% Co, 0.005% S, 0.154% P, trace SiO_{2}.
- Country: Mexico
- Region: Sinaloa
- Coordinates: 26°12′N 107°50′W
- Found date: 1863
- Alternative names: Sinaloa, Ranchito
- Related media on Wikimedia Commons

The Bacubirito meteorite is the largest meteorite found in Mexico, the third largest in the Americas and the sixth largest in the world. Found in 1863 by the geologist Gilbert Ellis Bailey in the village of Ranchito near the town of Sinaloa de Leyva, it is an iron meteorite weighing between 20 and 22 tonnes. It measures 4.25 meters long, 2 meters wide, and 1.75 meters high.

In 1959 the meteorite was moved from its original site to the Centro Cívico Constitución, in Culiacán. In 1992 it was again moved to the Centro de Ciencias de Sinaloa, where it is currently on display.

== See also ==
- List of largest meteorites on Earth

== Bibliography ==
The great Bacubirito meteorite (J. British Astron. Assoc. 83, 380-382, 1973)
