= Coahuila meteorite =

Meteorite found in Coahuila, Mexico

Coahuila
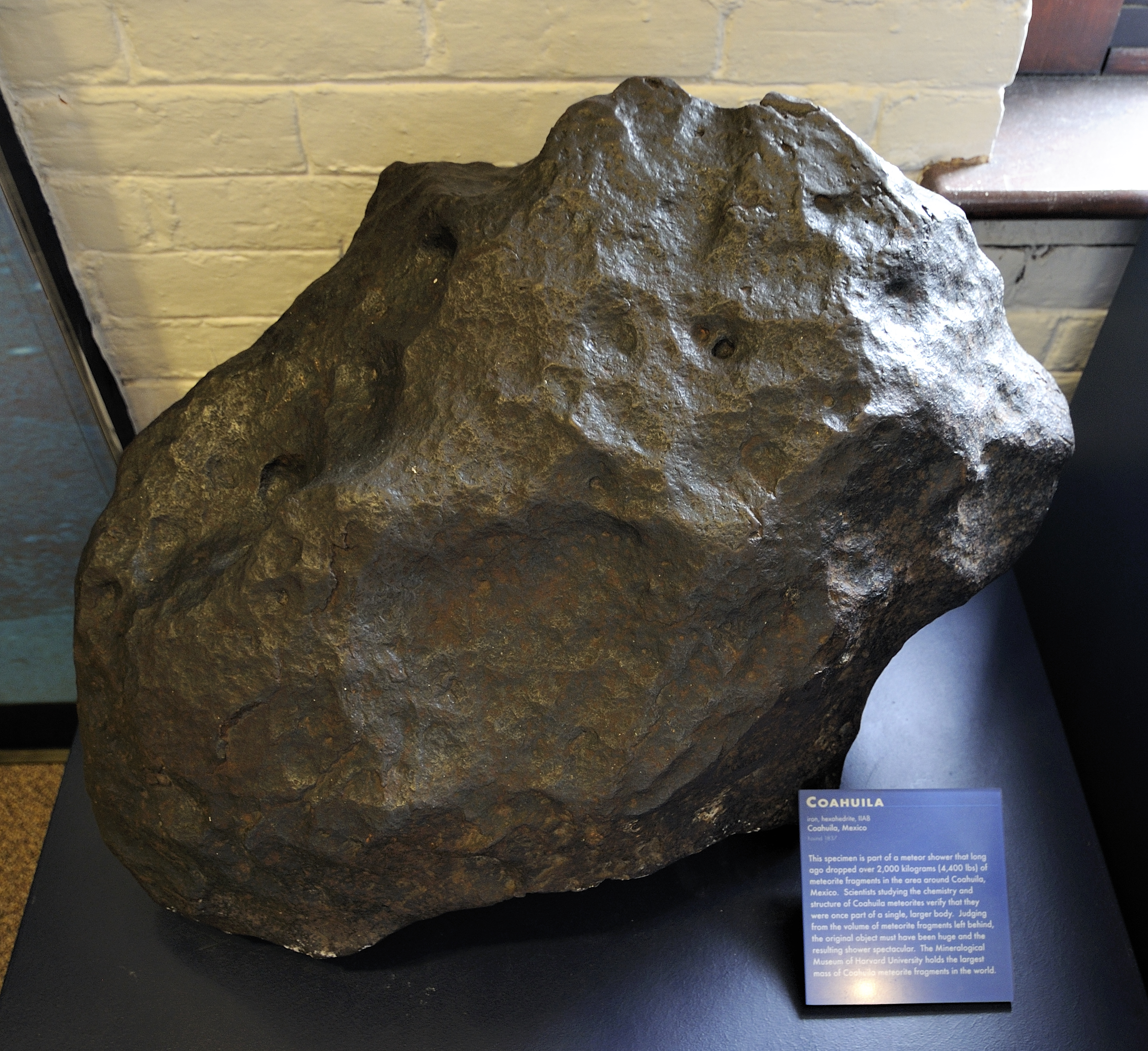
- Coahuila fragment at the Harvard Museum.
- Structural classification: Hexahedrite
- Group: IIAB
- Country: Mexico
- Region: Coahuila
- Coordinates: 28°42′N 102°44′W
- Observed fall: No
- Found date: 1837
- TKW: 2,100 kilograms (4,600 lb)

The Coahuila meteorite is a hexahedrite iron meteorite found in Coahuila, Mexico. The large number of fragments has led to many synonyms and many authors think that more than one meteorite is represented by the fragments. Only fragments found in Coahuila, that are hexahedrites and fall into the IIAB group should be called Coahuila meteorite.

The mineral Daubréelite was first described in this meteorite.

== See also ==
- Glossary of meteoritics
