= Marília (meteorite) =

Meteorite found in Brazil

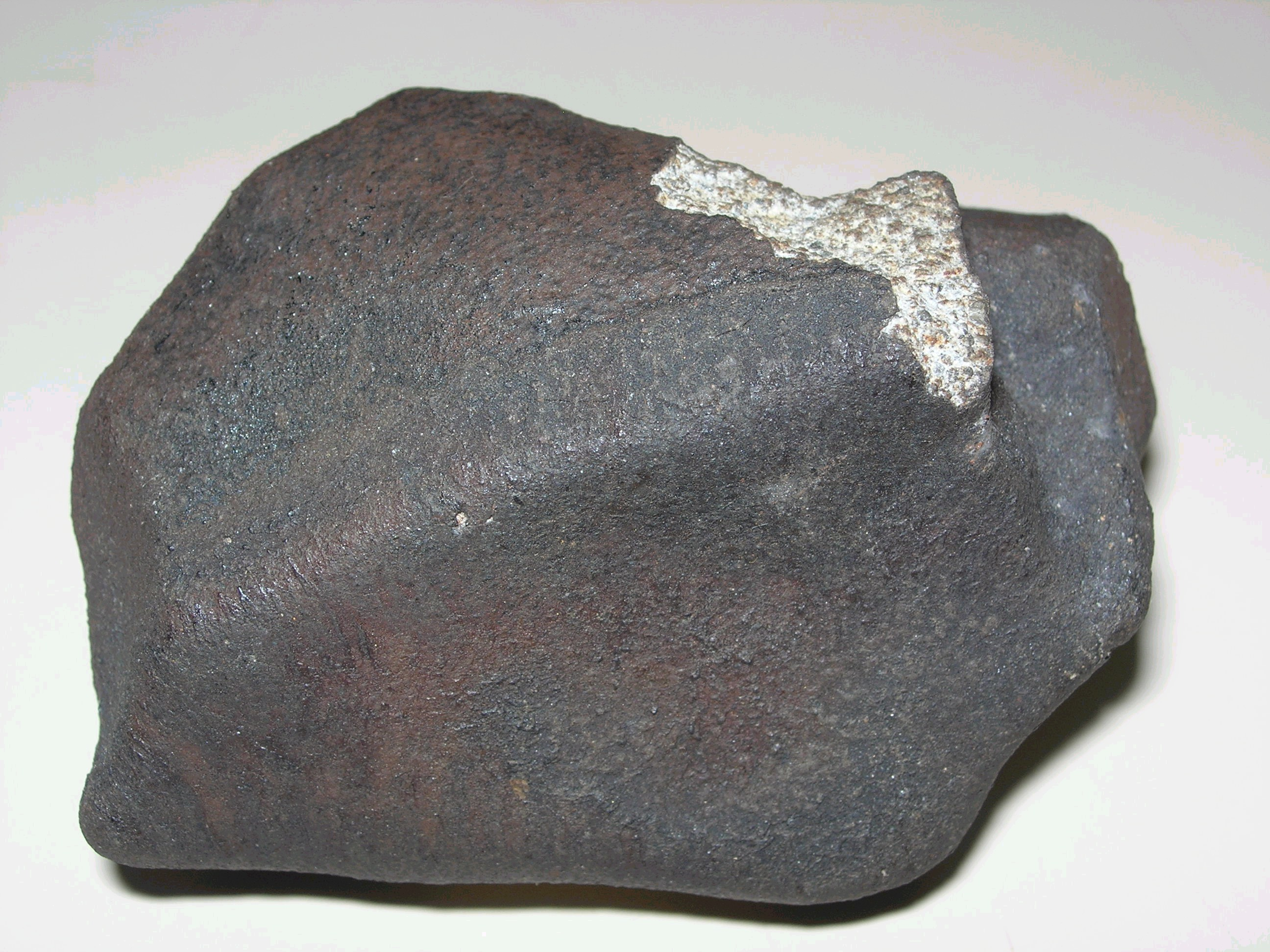
- Marília meteorite.
- Type: Stone
- Class: Ordinary chondrite
- Group: H4
- Country: Brazil
- Region: São Paulo
- Coordinates: 22°15′S 49°56′W
- Observed fall: Yes
- Fall date: October 5, 1971
- TKW: 2.5 kg

Marília is an H chondrite meteorite that fell to Earth on October 5, 1971, in Marília, São Paulo, Brazil. The meteorite produced only seven fragments in a total of 2.5 kilograms (5.5 lb).

== Classification ==
It is classified as H4-ordinary chondrite.

== Bibliography ==
- Gomes, C.B. & Keil, K. (1980) Brazilian Stony Meteorites: University of New Mexico Press: Albuquerque. pp. 162.
- Graham, A. L., Bevan, A. W. R. & Hutchison, B. (1985) Catalogue of Meteorites (4/e). University of Arizona Press: Tucson.

== See also ==
- Glossary of meteoritics
- Ordinary chondrite
