= Bench Crater meteorite =

Meteorite found on the Moon

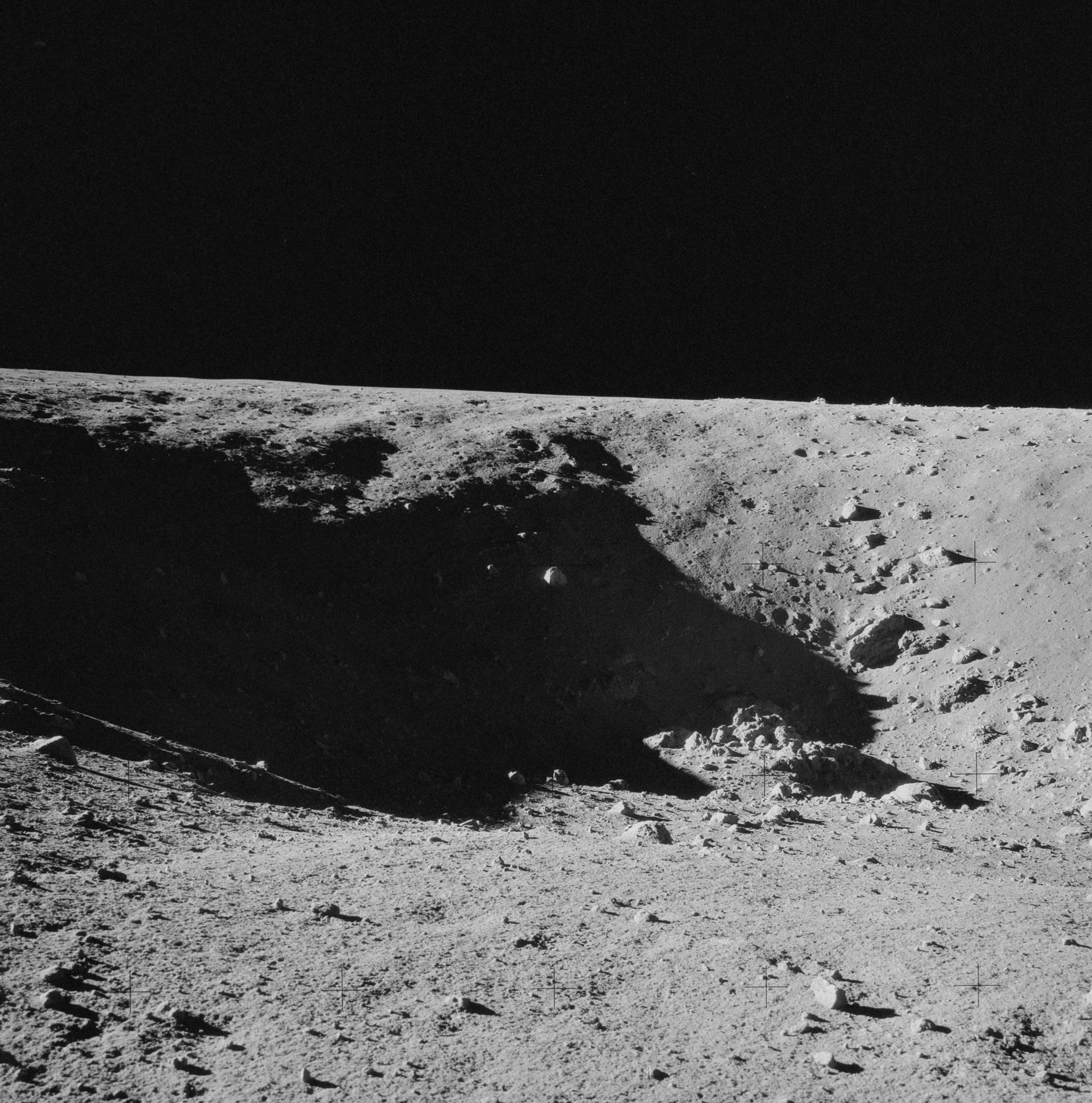
- Bench Crater – view of "rubble pile" in center of crater. The "Bench Crater meteorite" was collected during the Apollo 12 mission (EVA-2, November 20, 1969).
- Type: Chondrite
- Class: Carbonaceous chondrite
- Country: Earth's Moon
- Found date: November 20, 1969
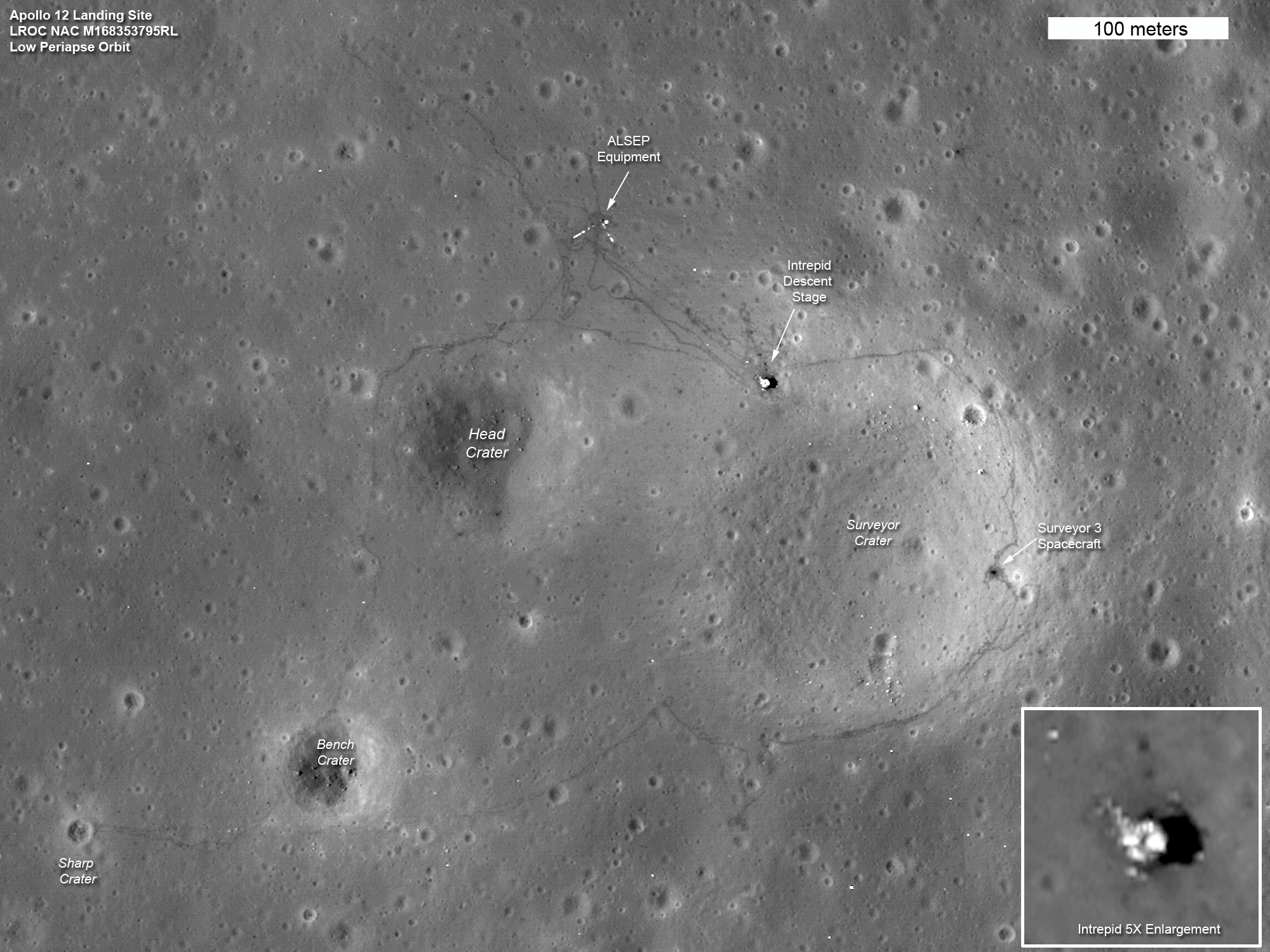
- Bench Crater SW (image bottom left) of the Apollo 12 lander (LRO, 2011) – shows footprints and hardware left by astronauts Pete Conrad and Alan Bean.

The Bench Crater meteorite is a meteorite discovered on the Moon by Apollo 12 astronauts in 1969. It is part of the friable basalt lunar sample 12037. Found on the north-west rim of the Bench Crater, it is the first meteorite to be discovered on a Solar System body other than the Earth. Its diameter is just a few millimeters. It is listed as a carbonaceous chondrite by the Meteoritical Society.

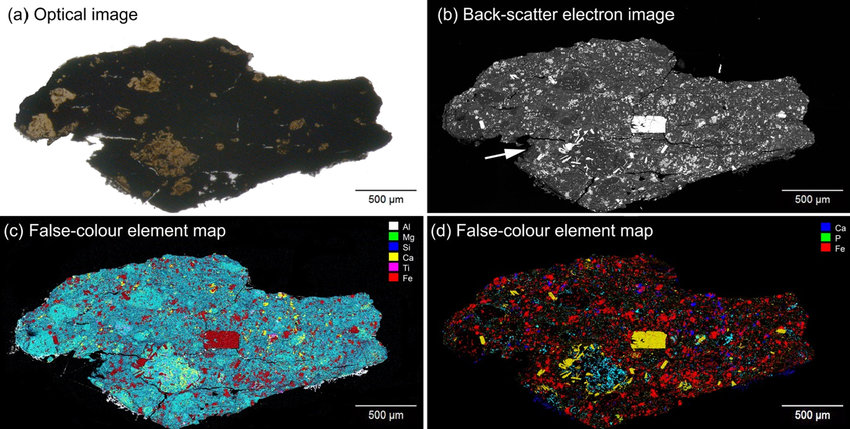
Bench Crater meteorite shown using various imaging techniques

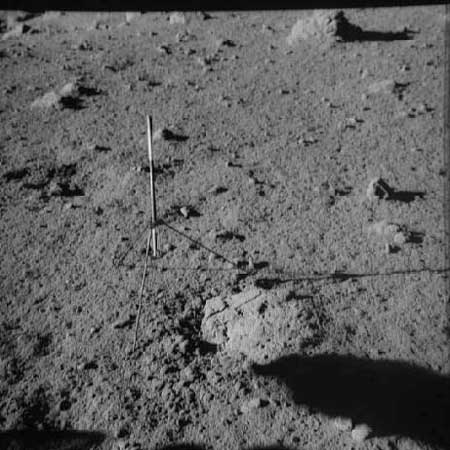
Location where lunar sample 12037 was discovered

== See also ==
- Glossary of meteoritics
- Big Bertha (lunar sample)
- Hadley Rille meteorite
- Heat Shield Rock (Mars – Meridiani Planum meteorite)
- List of Martian meteorites
- List of meteorites on Mars
