= Meteorite =

Solid debris from outer space that hits a planetary surface

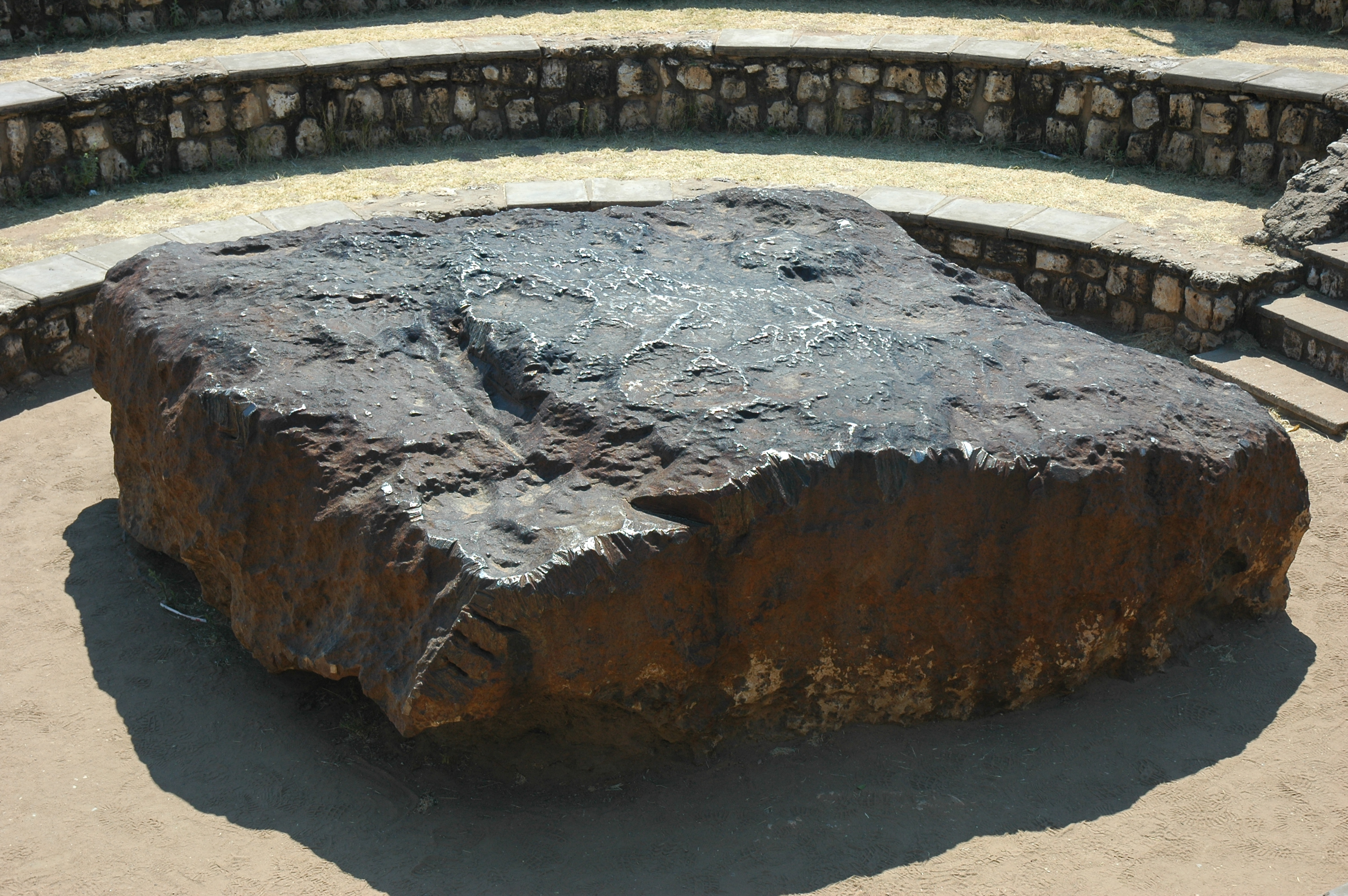
The 60-tonne (66-short-ton; 130,000-pound), 2.7 m (8 ft 10 in) Hoba meteorite in Namibia is the largest known intact meteorite.

A meteorite is a rock that originated in outer space and has fallen to the surface of a planet or moon. When the original object enters the atmosphere, various factors such as friction, pressure, and chemical interactions with the atmospheric gases cause it to heat up and radiate energy. It then becomes a meteor and forms a fireball, also known as a shooting star; astronomers call the brightest examples "bolides". Once it settles on the larger body's surface, the meteor becomes a meteorite. Meteorites vary greatly in size. For geologists, a bolide is a meteorite large enough to create an impact crater.

Meteorites that are recovered after being observed as they transit the atmosphere and impact Earth are called meteorite falls. All others are known as meteorite finds. Meteorites have traditionally been divided into three broad categories: stony meteorites that are rocks, mainly composed of silicate minerals; iron meteorites that are largely composed of ferronickel; and stony-iron meteorites that contain large amounts of both metallic and rocky material. Modern classification schemes divide meteorites into groups according to their structure, chemical and isotopic composition and mineralogy. "Meteorites" less than ~1 mm (3/64 inch) in diameter are classified as micrometeorites, however micrometeorites differ from meteorites in that they typically melt completely in the atmosphere and fall to Earth as quenched droplets. Extraterrestrial meteorites have been found on the Moon and on Mars.

Most space rocks that fall to Earth originate from a small number of asteroids in the main asteroid belt. The origin of most meteorites can be traced to just a handful of asteroid breakup events – possibly even individual asteroids.

== Fall phenomena ==
Most meteoroids disintegrate when entering the Earth's atmosphere. Usually, five to ten a year are observed to fall and are subsequently recovered and made known to scientists. Few meteorites are large enough to create large impact craters. Instead, they typically arrive at the surface at their terminal velocity and, at most, create a small pit.

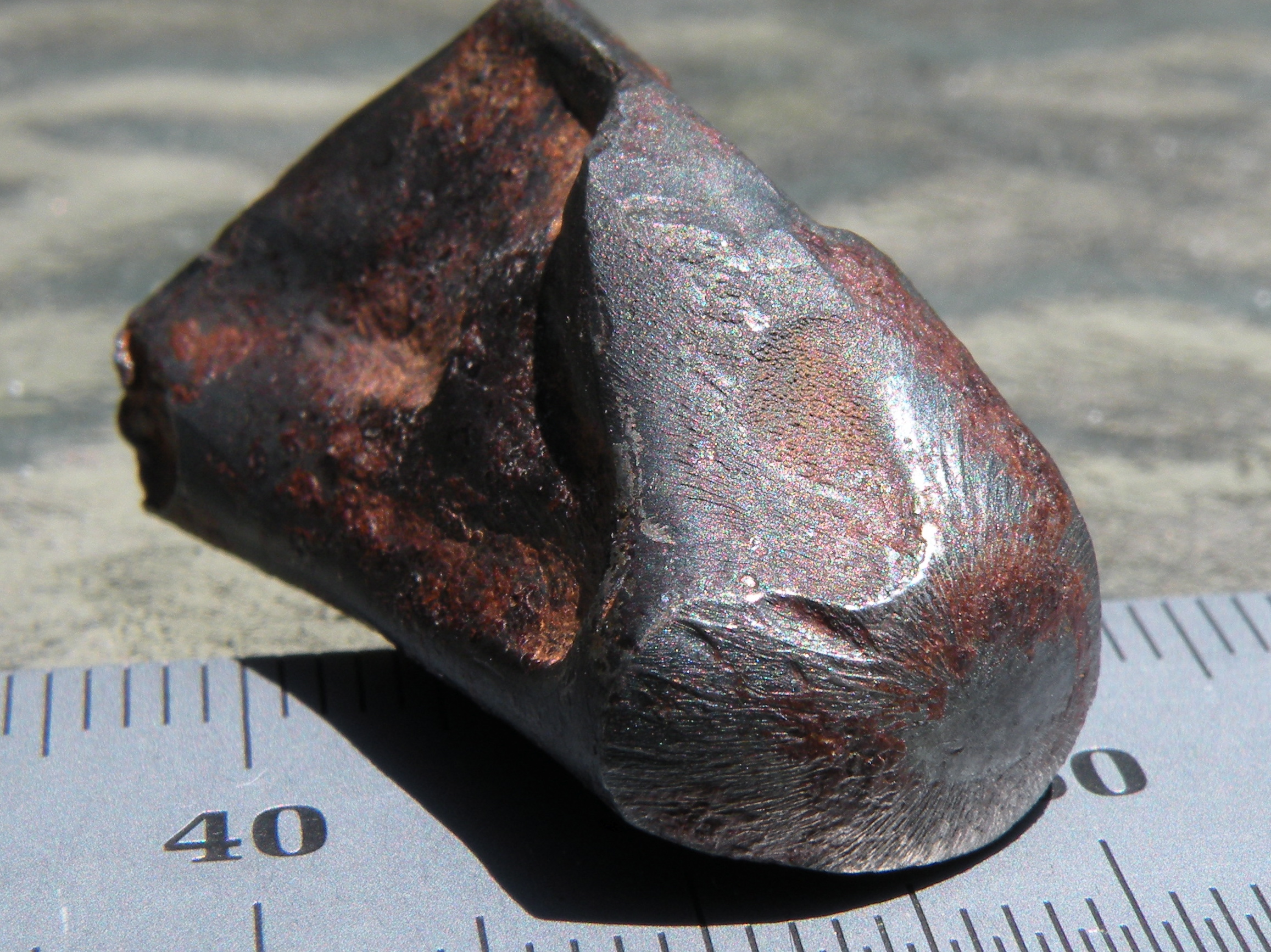
NWA 859 iron meteorite showing effects of atmospheric ablation

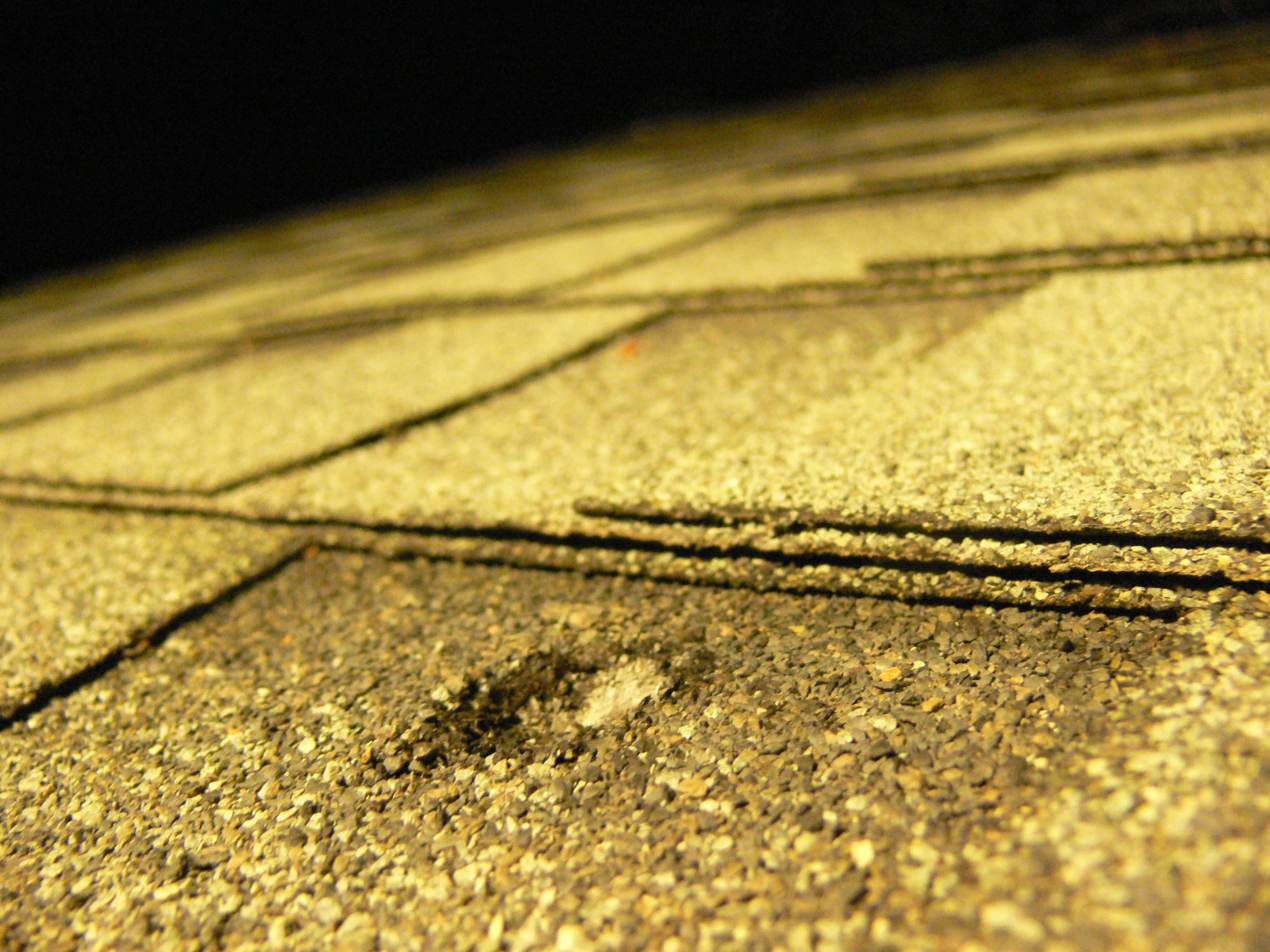
The impact pit made by a 61.9 grams (2.18 ounces) Novato meteorite when it hit the roof of a house on 17 October 2012.

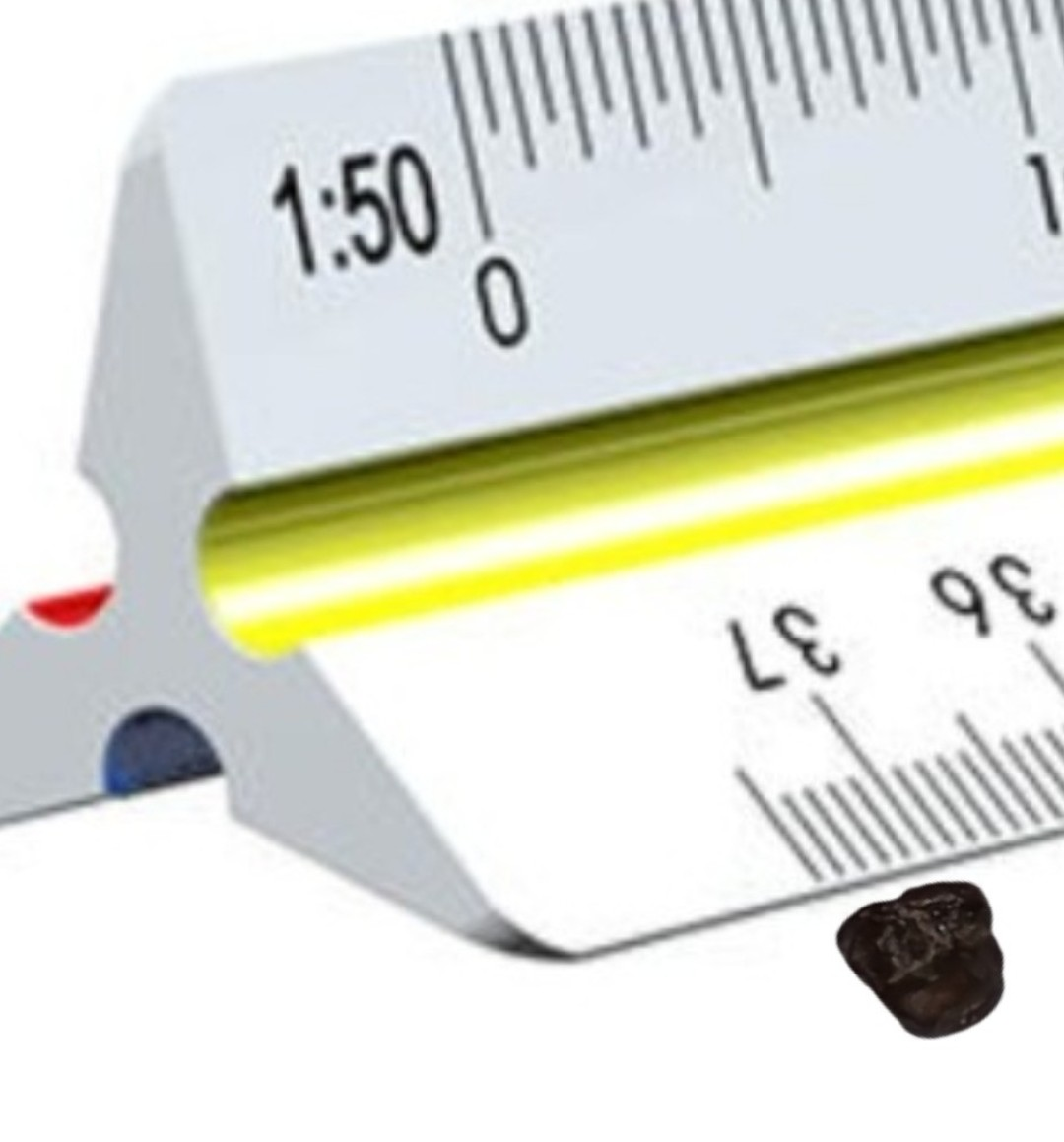
Meteorite SPMN170422 shows how far atmospheric ablation can erode.

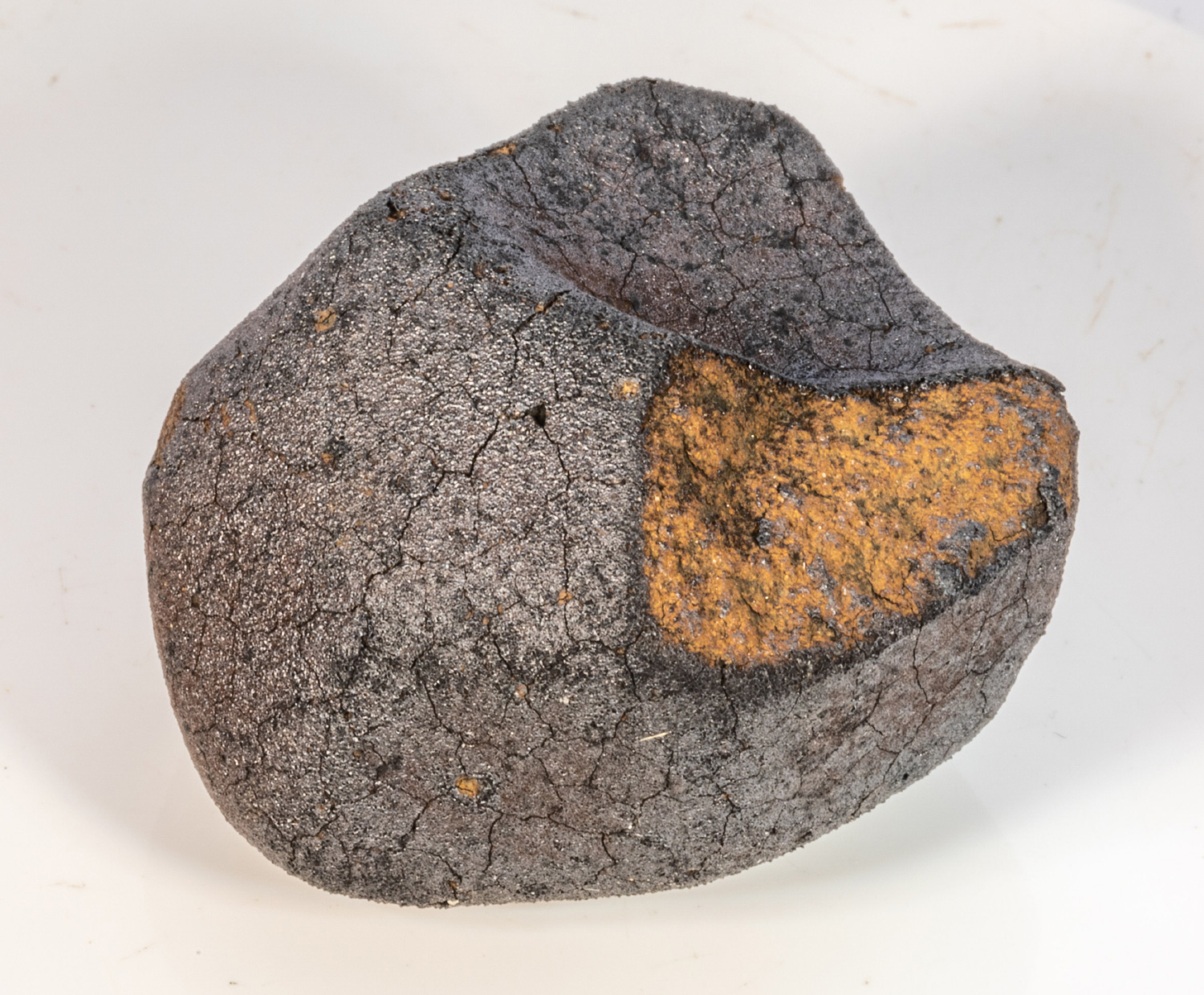
Meteorite fallen near Flensburg in 2019.

Large meteoroids may strike the earth with a significant fraction of their escape velocity (second cosmic velocity), leaving behind a hypervelocity impact crater. The kind of crater will depend on the size, composition, degree of fragmentation, and incoming angle of the impactor. The force of such collisions has the potential to cause widespread destruction. The most frequent hypervelocity cratering events on the Earth are caused by iron meteoroids, which are most easily able to transit the atmosphere intact. Examples of craters caused by iron meteoroids include Barringer Meteor Crater, Odessa Meteor Crater, Wabar craters, and Wolfe Creek crater; iron meteorites are found in association with all of these craters. In contrast, even relatively large stony or icy bodies such as small comets or asteroids, up to millions of tons, are disrupted in the atmosphere, and do not make impact craters. Although such disruption events are uncommon, they can cause a considerable concussion to occur; the famed Tunguska event probably resulted from such an incident. Very large stony objects, hundreds of meters in diameter or more, weighing tens of millions of tons or more, can reach the surface and cause large craters but are very rare. Such events are generally so energetic that the impactor is completely destroyed, leaving no meteorites. (The first example of a stony meteorite found in association with a large impact crater, the Morokweng impact structure in South Africa, was reported in May 2006.)

Several phenomena are well documented during witnessed meteorite falls too small to produce hypervelocity craters. The fireball that occurs as the meteoroid passes through the atmosphere can appear to be very bright, rivaling the sun in intensity, although most are far dimmer and may not even be noticed during the daytime. Various colors have been reported, including yellow, green, and red. Flashes and bursts of light can occur as the object breaks up. Explosions, detonations, and rumblings are often heard during meteorite falls, which can be caused by sonic booms as well as shock waves resulting from major fragmentation events. These sounds can be heard over wide areas, with a radius of a hundred or more kilometers. Whistling and hissing sounds are also sometimes heard but are poorly understood. Following the passage of the fireball, it is not unusual for a dust trail to linger in the atmosphere for several minutes.

As meteoroids are heated during atmospheric entry, their surfaces melt and experience ablation. They can be sculpted into various shapes during this process, sometimes resulting in shallow thumbprint-like indentations on their surfaces called regmaglypts. If the meteoroid maintains a fixed orientation for some time, without tumbling, it may develop a conical "nose cone" or "heat shield" shape. As it decelerates, eventually the molten surface layer solidifies into a thin fusion crust, which on most meteorites is black (on some achondrites, the fusion crust may be very light-colored). On stony meteorites, the heat-affected zone is at most a few mm deep; in iron meteorites, which are more thermally conductive, the structure of the metal may be affected by heat up to 1 cm (3/8 inch) below the surface. Reports vary; some meteorites are reported to be "burning hot to the touch" upon landing, while others are alleged to have been cold enough to condense water and form a frost.

Meteoroids that disintegrate in the atmosphere may fall as meteorite showers, which can range from only a few up to thousands of separate individuals. The area over which a meteorite shower falls is known as its strewn field. Strewn fields are commonly elliptical in shape, with the major axis parallel to the direction of flight. In most cases, the largest meteorites in a shower are found farthest down-range in the strewn field.

== Classification ==
Meteoroid: A comet is a small celestial body, usually a few kilometers in diameter, composed mainly of ice, dust, and rock. As it approaches the Sun, gases and dust are released, forming a glowing coma and often a luminous tail.

Meteor: A meteor is the visible streak of light produced when a meteoroid enters Earth’s atmosphere and burns up completely (“shooting star”).

Meteorite: A meteorite is a meteoroid that enters Earth’s atmosphere, does not completely burn up, and reaches the Earth’s surface.

Asteroid: Asteroids (also called minor planets or planetoids) are small rocky bodies that orbit the Sun. They are larger than meteoroids but smaller than dwarf planets.

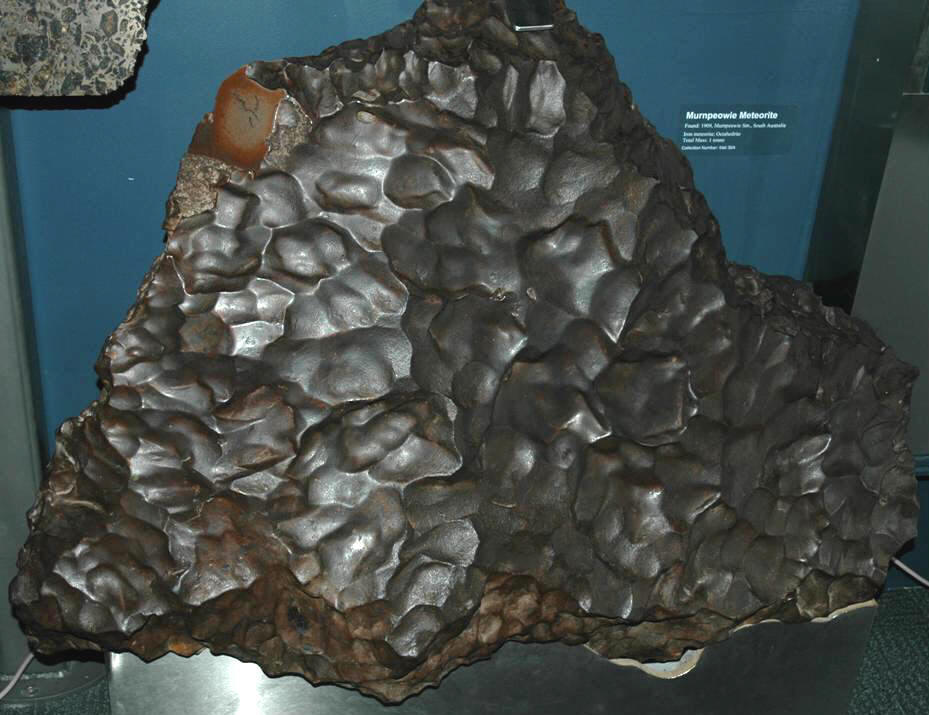
Murnpeowie meteorite, an iron meteorite with regmaglypts (thumbprint-like depressions), from ablation caused by aerodynamic heating during fall

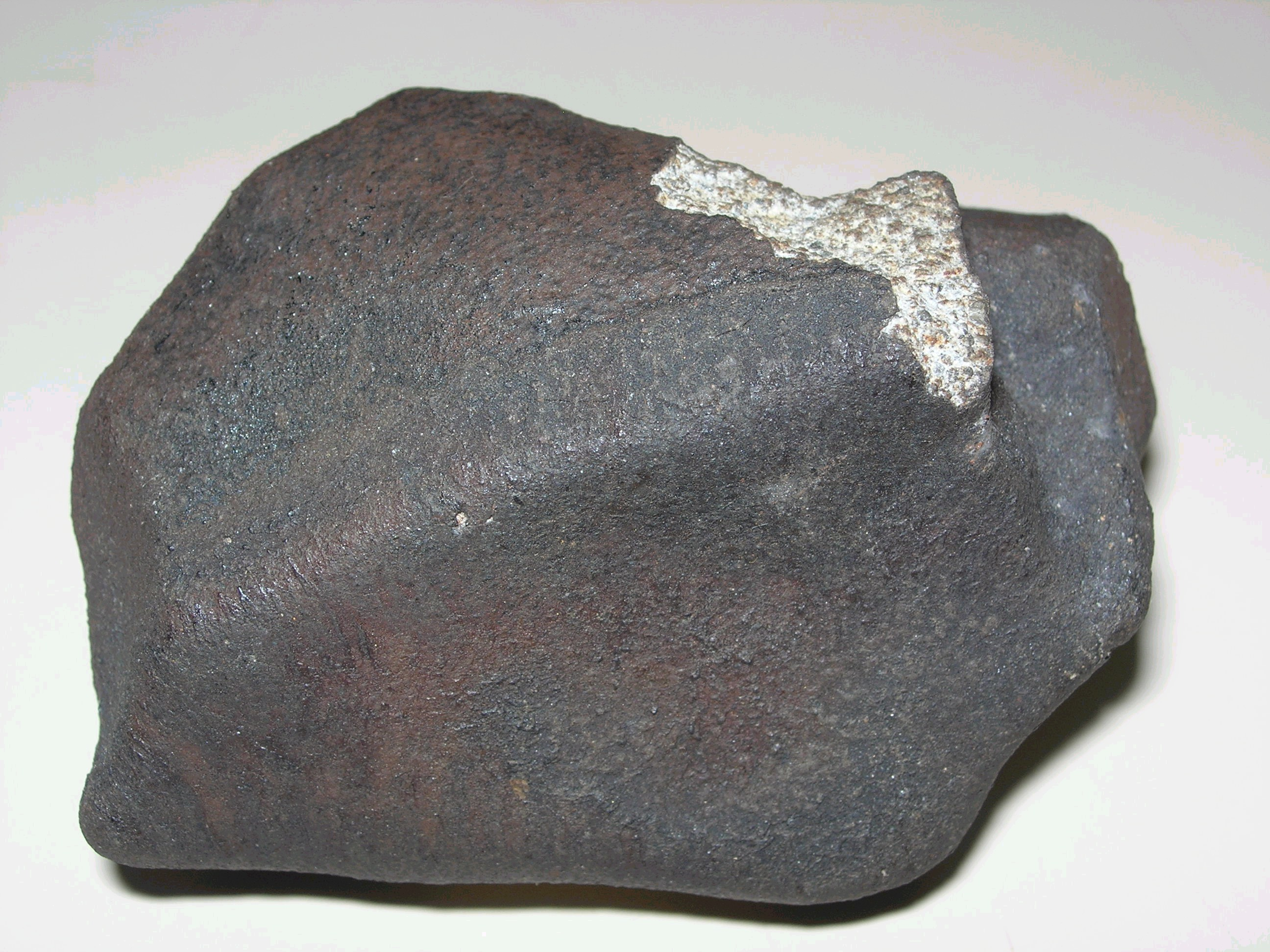
Marília Meteorite, a chondrite H4, which fell in Marília, Brazil, in 1971

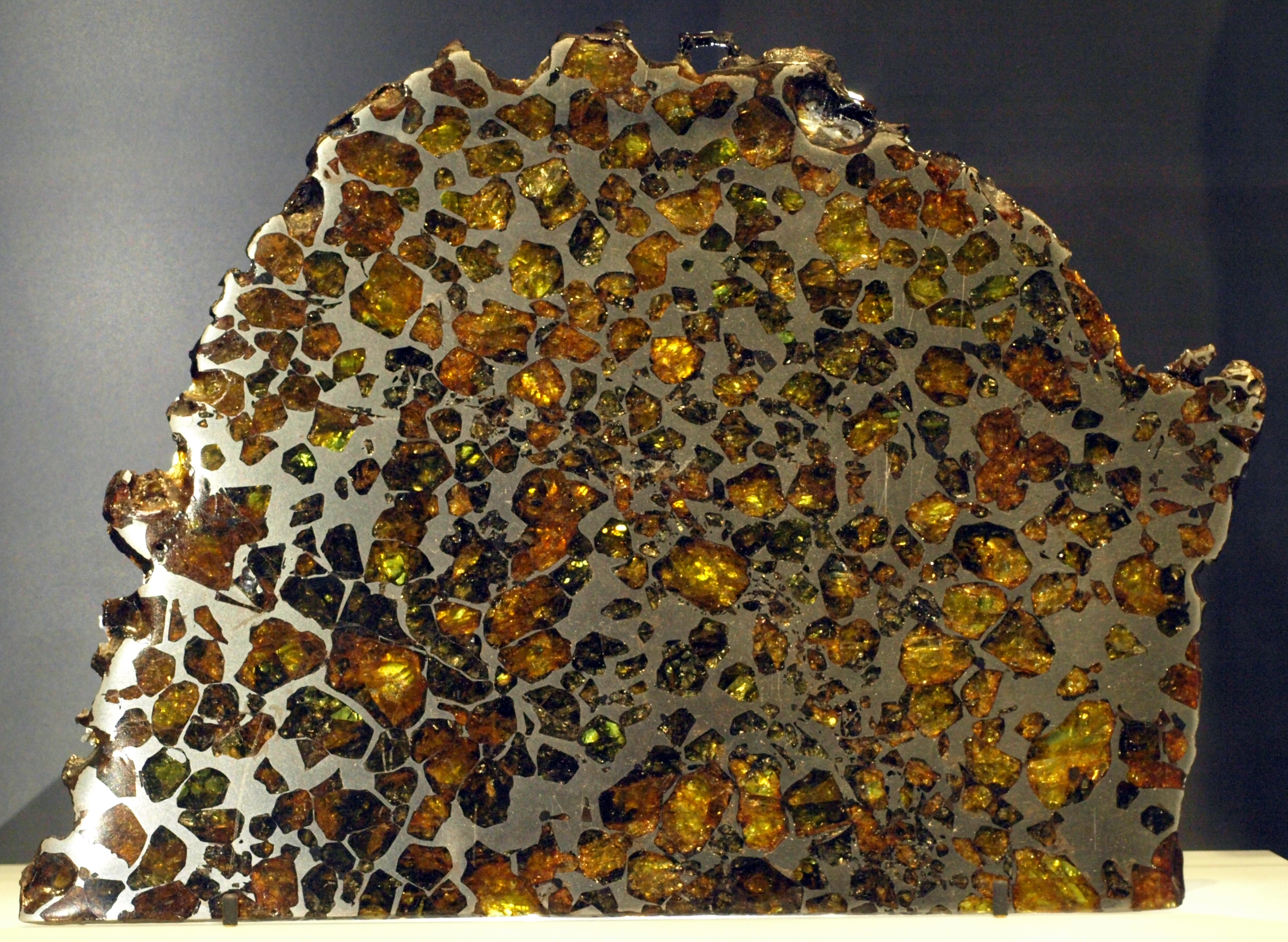
A cut and polished slice of the Esquel meteorite, a stony-iron pallasite. Yellow-green olivine crystals are encased in the iron-nickel matrix.

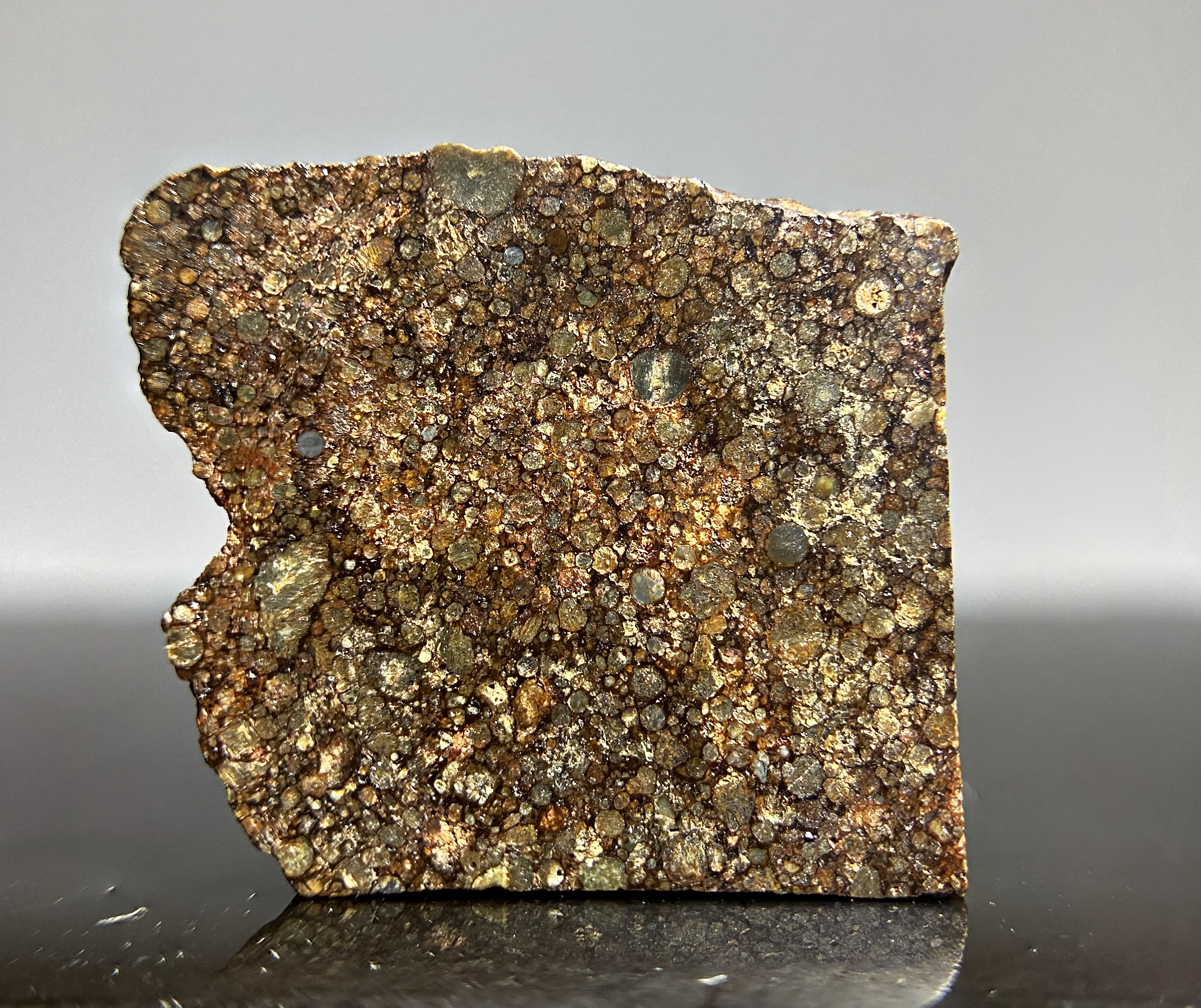
Close-packed chondrules in a primitive chondrite NWA 10499.

Most meteorites are stony meteorites, classed as chondrites and achondrites. Only about 6% of meteorites are iron meteorites or a blend of rock and metal, the stony-iron meteorites. Modern classification of meteorites is complex. The review paper of Krot et al. (2007) summarizes modern meteorite taxonomy.

About 86% of the meteorites are chondrites, which are named for the small, round particles they contain. These particles, or chondrules, are composed mostly of silicate minerals that appear to have been melted while they were free-floating objects in space. Certain types of chondrites also contain small amounts of organic matter, including amino acids, and presolar grains. Chondrites are typically about 4.55 billion years old and are thought to represent material from the asteroid belt that never coalesced into large bodies. Like comets, chondritic asteroids are some of the oldest and most primitive materials in the Solar System. Chondrites are often considered to be "the building blocks of the planets".

About 8% of the meteorites are achondrites (meaning they do not contain chondrules), some of which are similar to terrestrial igneous rocks. Most achondrites are also ancient rocks, and are thought to represent crustal material of differentiated planetesimals. One large family of achondrites (the HED meteorites) may have originated on the parent body of the Vesta Family, although this claim is disputed. Others derive from unidentified asteroids. Two small groups of achondrites are younger and do not appear to come from the asteroid belt. One of these groups comes from the Moon, and includes rocks similar to those brought back to Earth by Apollo and Luna programs. The other group is almost certainly from Mars and constitutes the only materials from other planets ever recovered by humans.

About 5% of meteorites that have been seen to fall are iron meteorites composed of iron-nickel alloys, such as kamacite and/or taenite. Most iron meteorites are thought to come from the cores of planetesimals that were once molten. As with the Earth, the denser metal separated from silicate material and sank toward the center of the planetesimal, forming its core. After the planetesimal solidified, it broke up in a collision with another planetesimal. Due to the low abundance of iron meteorites in collection areas such as Antarctica, where most of the meteoric material that has fallen can be recovered, it is possible that the percentage of iron-meteorite falls is lower than 5%. This would be explained by a recovery bias; laypeople are more likely to notice and recover solid masses of metal than most other meteorite types. The abundance of iron meteorites relative to total Antarctic finds is 0.4%.

Stony-iron meteorites constitute the remaining 1%. They are a mixture of iron-nickel metal and silicate minerals. One type, called pallasites, is thought to have originated in the boundary zone above the core regions where iron meteorites originated. The other major type of stony-iron meteorites is the mesosiderites.

Tektites (from Greek tektos, molten) are not themselves meteorites, but are rather natural glass objects up to a few centimeters in size that were formed—according to most scientists—by the impacts of large meteorites on Earth's surface. A few researchers have favored tektites originating from the Moon as volcanic ejecta, but this theory has lost much of its support over the last few decades.

== Frequency ==
Meteorite droppings are actually a fairly common event on Earth. There are about 8-9 meteorite falls per 1,000,000 km^{2} (390,000 sq mi) per year resulting in a total surviving mass of over 1 kilogram (2.2 lb), 36-116 falls over 10 g (0.35 oz), ~38 of mass greater than 50 grams (1.8 oz) and around 27 resulting in ground mass of >100 grams (3.5 oz; 0.22 lb).

The amount of falls $N$ of total mass reaching the ground greater than M expressed in grams per 1,000,000 km² per year can be derived from formula

$\log N = a \log M + b$

where a and b were calculated to be -0.49 and +2.41 for droppings of mass <1030 grams and -0.82, +3.41 for masses over 1030 g.

Meteorite Bulletin database lists 85 860 meteorites as of April 2026, including those with provisional names.

== Chemistry ==
In 2015, NASA scientists reported that complex organic compounds found in DNA and RNA, including uracil, cytosine, and thymine, have been formed in the laboratory under outer space conditions, using starting chemicals, such as pyrimidine, found in meteorites. Pyrimidine and polycyclic aromatic hydrocarbons (PAHs) may have been formed in red giants or in interstellar dust and gas clouds, according to the scientists.

In 2018, researchers found that 4.5 billion-year-old meteorites found on Earth contained liquid water along with prebiotic complex organic substances that may be ingredients for life.

In 2019, scientists reported detecting sugar molecules in meteorites for the first time, including ribose, suggesting that chemical processes on asteroids can produce some organic compounds fundamental to life, and supporting the notion of an RNA world prior to a DNA-based origin of life on Earth.

In 2022, a Japanese group reported that they had found adenine (A), thymine (T), guanine (G), cytosine (C) and uracil (U) inside carbon-rich meteorites. These compounds are building blocks of DNA and RNA, the genetic code of all life on Earth. These compounds have also occurred spontaneously in laboratory settings emulating conditions in outer space.

== Sources of meteorites found on Earth ==
Until recently, the source of only about 6% of meteorites had been traced to their sources: the Moon, Mars, and asteroid Vesta. Approximately 70% of meteorites found on Earth now appear to originate from break-ups of three asteroids.

== Weathering ==
Most meteorites date from the early Solar System and are by far the oldest extant material on Earth. Analysis of terrestrial weathering due to water, salt, oxygen, etc. is used to quantify the degree of alteration that a meteorite has experienced. Several qualitative weathering indices have been applied to Antarctic and desertic samples.

The most commonly employed weathering scale, used for ordinary chondrites, ranges from W0 (pristine state) to W6 (heavy alteration).

=== Fossil meteorites ===
"Fossil" meteorites are sometimes discovered by geologists. They represent the highly weathered remains of meteorites that fell to Earth in the remote past and were preserved in sedimentary deposits sufficiently well that they can be recognized through mineralogical and geochemical studies. The Thorsberg limestone quarry in Sweden has produced an anomalously large number – exceeding one hundred – fossil meteorites from the Ordovician, nearly all of which are highly weathered L-chondrites that still resemble the original meteorite under a petrographic microscope, but which have had their original material almost entirely replaced by terrestrial secondary mineralization. The extraterrestrial provenance was demonstrated in part through isotopic analysis of relict spinel grains, a mineral that is common in meteorites, is insoluble in water, and is able to persist chemically unchanged in the terrestrial weathering environment. Scientists believe that these meteorites, which have all also been found in Russia and China, all originated from the same source, a collision that occurred somewhere between Jupiter and Mars. One of these fossil meteorites, dubbed Österplana 065, appears to represent a distinct type of meteorite that is "extinct" in the sense that it is no longer falling to Earth, the parent body having already been completely depleted from the reservoir of near-Earth objects.

== Collection ==
A "meteorite fall", also called an "observed fall", is a meteorite collected after its arrival was observed by people or automated devices. Any other meteorite is called a "meteorite find". There are more than 1,100 documented falls listed in widely used databases, most of which have specimens in modern collections. As of January 2019, the Meteoritical Bulletin Database had 1,180 confirmed falls.

=== Falls ===
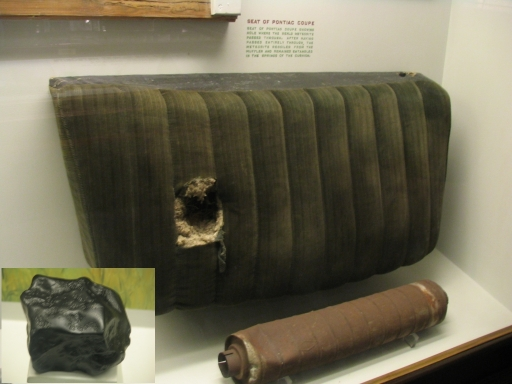
Car seat and muffler hit by the Benld meteorite in 1938, with the meteorite inset. An observed fall.

Most meteorite falls are collected on the basis of eyewitness accounts of the fireball or the impact of the object on the ground, or both. Therefore, despite the fact that meteorites fall with virtually equal probability everywhere on Earth, verified meteorite falls tend to be concentrated in areas with higher human population densities such as Europe, Japan, and northern India.

A small number of meteorite falls have been observed with automated cameras and recovered following calculation of the impact point. The first of these was the Příbram meteorite, which fell in Czechoslovakia (now the Czech Republic) in 1959. In this case, two cameras used to photograph meteors captured images of the fireball. The images were used both to determine the location of the stones on the ground and, more significantly, to calculate for the first time an accurate orbit for a recovered meteorite.

Following the Příbram fall, other nations established automated observing programs aimed at studying infalling meteorites. One of these was the Prairie Network, operated by the Smithsonian Astrophysical Observatory from 1963 to 1975 in the midwestern US. This program also observed a meteorite fall, the Lost City chondrite, allowing its recovery and a calculation of its orbit. Another program in Canada, the Meteorite Observation and Recovery Project, ran from 1971 to 1985. It too recovered a single meteorite, Innisfree, in 1977. Finally, observations by the European Fireball Network, a descendant of the original Czech program that recovered Příbram, led to the discovery and orbit calculations for the Neuschwanstein meteorite in 2002. NASA has an automated system that detects meteors and calculates the orbit, magnitude, ground track, and other parameters over the southeast USA, which often detects a number of events each night.

=== Finds ===
Until the twentieth century, only a few hundred meteorite finds had ever been discovered. More than 80% of these were iron and stony-iron meteorites, which are easily distinguished from local rocks. To this day, few stony meteorites are reported each year that can be considered to be "accidental" finds. The reason there are now more than 30,000 meteorite finds in the world's collections started with the discovery by Harvey H. Nininger that meteorites are much more common on the surface of the Earth than was previously thought.

==== Canada ====
Meteorites that land in Canada are protected under the Cultural Property Export and Import Act. In July 2024, a meteorite was recorded by security footage crashing into a residential property in Marshfield, Prince Edward Island. It is believed to be the first time such an event has been captured on camera and the sound of the crash recorded. It was subsequently registered as the Charlottetown meteorite, named after the city near to where it landed.

==== United States ====
Nininger's strategy was to search for meteorites in the Great Plains of the United States, where the land was largely cultivated and the soil contained few rocks. Between the late 1920s and the 1950s, he traveled across the region, educating local people about what meteorites looked like and what to do if they thought they had found one, for example, in the course of clearing a field. The result was the discovery of more than 200 new meteorites, mostly stony types.

In the late 1960s, Roosevelt County, New Mexico, was found to be a particularly good place to find meteorites. After the discovery of a few meteorites in 1967, a public awareness campaign resulted in the finding of nearly 100 new specimens in the next few years, with many being by a single person, Ivan Wilson. In total, nearly 140 meteorites were found in the region since 1967. In the area of the finds, the ground was originally covered by a shallow, loose soil sitting atop a hardpan layer. During the dustbowl era, the loose soil was blown off, leaving any rocks and meteorites that were present stranded on the exposed surface.

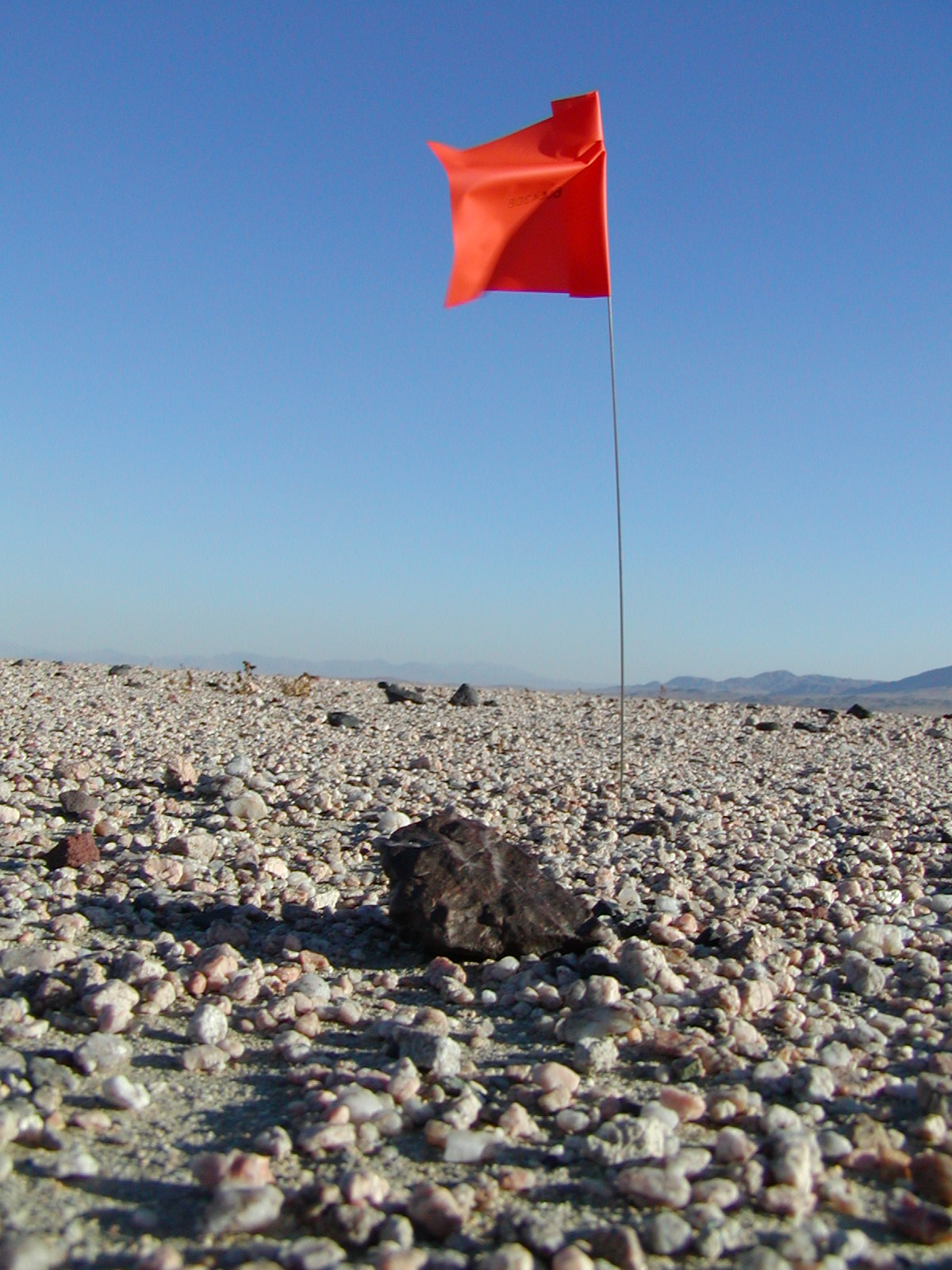
A stony meteorite (H5) found just north of Barstow, California, in 2006

Beginning in the mid-1960s, amateur meteorite hunters began scouring the arid areas of the southwestern United States. To date, thousands of meteorites have been recovered from the Mojave, Sonoran, Great Basin, and Chihuahuan Deserts, with many being recovered on dry lake beds. Significant finds include the three-tonne Old Woman meteorite, currently on display at the Desert Discovery Center in Barstow, California, and the Franconia and Gold Basin meteorite strewn fields; hundreds of kilograms of meteorites have been recovered from each. A number of finds from the American Southwest have been submitted with false find locations, as many finders think it is unwise to publicly share that information for fear of confiscation by the federal government and competition with other hunters at published find sites. Several of the meteorites found recently are currently on display in the Griffith Observatory in Los Angeles, and at UCLA's Meteorite Gallery.

==== Antarctica ====
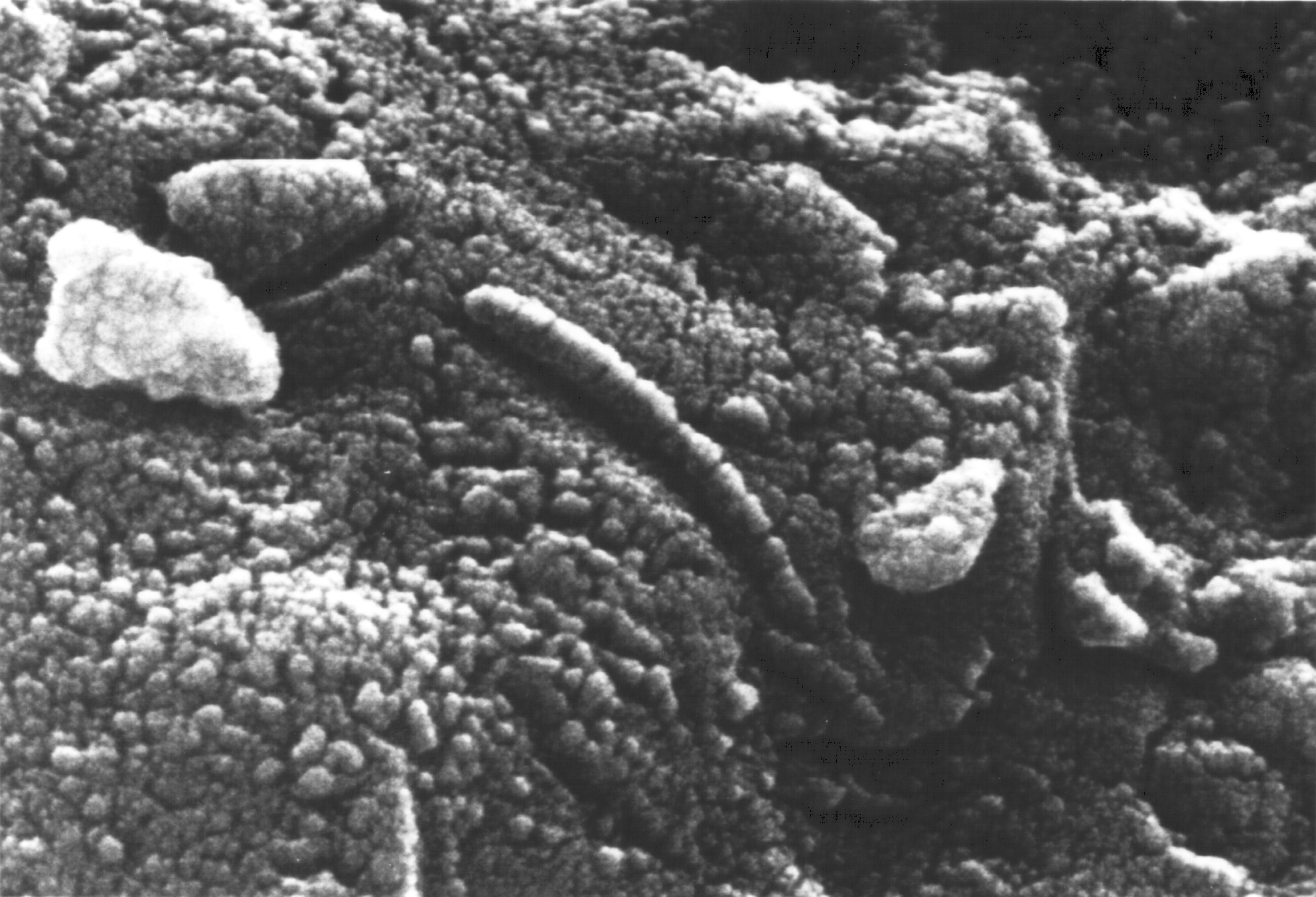
A scanning electron microscope revealed structures resembling bacteria fossils – in the meteorite ALH84001 discovered in Antarctica in 1984. Microscopically, the features were initially interpreted as fossils of bacteria-like lifeforms. It has since been shown that similar magnetite structures can form without the presence of microbial life in hydrothermal systems.

A few meteorites were found in Antarctica between 1912 and 1964. In 1969, the 10th Japanese Antarctic Research Expedition found nine meteorites on a blue ice field near the Yamato Mountains. With this discovery, came the realization that movement of ice sheets might act to concentrate meteorites in certain areas. After a dozen other specimens were found in the same place in 1973, a Japanese expedition was launched in 1974 dedicated to the search for meteorites. This team recovered nearly 700 meteorites.

Shortly thereafter, the United States began its own program to search for Antarctic meteorites, operating along the Transantarctic Mountains on the other side of the continent: the Antarctic Search for Meteorites (ANSMET) program. European teams, starting with a consortium called "EUROMET" in the 1990/91 season, and continuing with a program by the Italian Programma Nazionale di Ricerche in Antartide have also conducted systematic searches for Antarctic meteorites.

The Antarctic Scientific Exploration of China has conducted successful meteorite searches since 2000. A Korean program (KOREAMET) was launched in 2007 and has collected a few meteorites. The combined efforts of all of these expeditions have produced more than 23,000 classified meteorite specimens since 1974, with thousands more that have not yet been classified. For more information see the article by Harvey (2003).

==== Australia ====
At about the same time as meteorite concentrations were being discovered in the cold desert of Antarctica, collectors discovered that many meteorites could also be found in the hot deserts of Australia. Several dozen meteorites had already been found in the Nullarbor Plain region of Western Australia and South Australia. Systematic searches between about 1971 and the present recovered more than 500 others, ~300 of which are currently well characterized. The meteorites can be found in this region because the land presents a flat, featureless, plain covered by limestone. In the extremely arid climate, there has been relatively little weathering or sedimentation on the surface for tens of thousands of years, allowing meteorites to accumulate without being buried or destroyed. The dark-colored meteorites can then be recognized among the very different looking limestone pebbles and rocks.

==== The Sahara ====
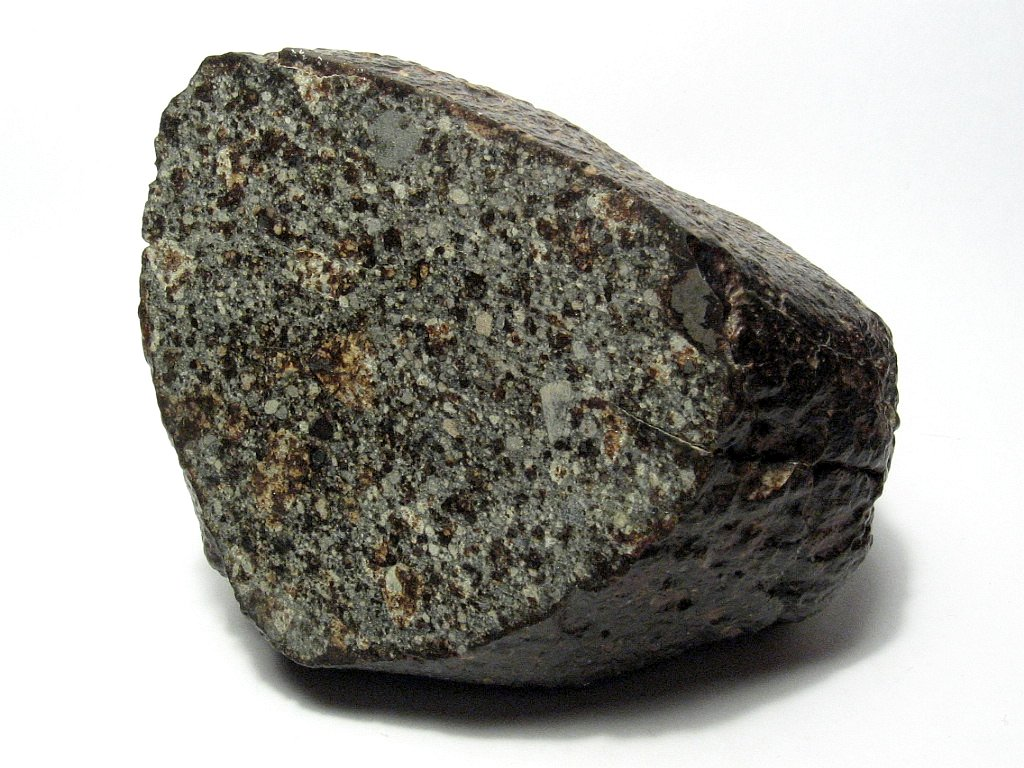
This small meteorite is from the NWA 869 strewn field, near Tindouf, Algeria. Currently classified as an L3.8-6 ordinary chondrite it shows brecciation and abundant chondrules.

In 1986–87, a German team installing a network of seismic stations while prospecting for oil discovered about 65 meteorites on a flat, desert plain about 100 kilometres (62 mi) southeast of Dirj (Daraj), Libya. A few years later, a desert enthusiast saw photographs of meteorites being recovered by scientists in Antarctica, and thought that he had seen similar occurrences in northern Africa. In 1989, he recovered about 100 meteorites from several distinct locations in Libya and Algeria. Over the next several years, he and others who followed found at least 400 more meteorites. The find locations were generally in regions known as regs or hamadas: flat, featureless areas covered only by small pebbles and minor amounts of sand. Dark-colored meteorites can be easily spotted in these places. In the case of several meteorite fields, such as Dar al Gani, Dhofar, and others, favorable light-colored geology consisting of basic rocks (clays, dolomites, and limestones) makes meteorites particularly easy to identify.

Although meteorites had been sold commercially and collected by hobbyists for many decades, up to the time of the Saharan finds of the late 1980s and early 1990s, most meteorites were deposited in or purchased by museums and similar institutions where they were exhibited and made available for scientific research. The sudden availability of large numbers of meteorites that could be found with relative ease in places that were readily accessible (especially compared to Antarctica), led to a rapid rise in commercial collection of meteorites. This process was accelerated when, in 1997, meteorites coming from both the Moon and Mars were found in Libya. By the late 1990s, private meteorite-collecting expeditions had been launched throughout the Sahara. Specimens of the meteorites recovered in this way are still deposited in research collections, but most of the material is sold to private collectors. These expeditions have now brought the total number of well-described meteorites found in Algeria and Libya to more than 500.

==== Northwest Africa ====
Meteorite markets came into existence in the late 1990s, especially in Morocco. This trade was driven by Western commercialization and an increasing number of collectors. The meteorites were supplied by nomads and local people who combed the deserts looking for specimens to sell. Many thousands of meteorites have been distributed in this way, most of which lack any information about how, when, or where they were discovered. These are the so-called "Northwest Africa" meteorites. When they get classified, they are named "Northwest Africa" (abbreviated NWA) followed by a number. It is generally accepted that NWA meteorites originate in Morocco, Algeria, Western Sahara, Mali, and possibly even further afield. Nearly all of these meteorites leave Africa through Morocco. Scores of important meteorites, including Lunar and Martian ones, have been discovered and made available to science via this route. A few of the more notable meteorites recovered include Tissint and NWA 7034. Tissint was the first witnessed Martian meteorite fall in more than fifty years; NWA 7034 is the oldest meteorite known to come from Mars, and is a unique water-bearing regolith breccia.

==== Arabian Peninsula ====
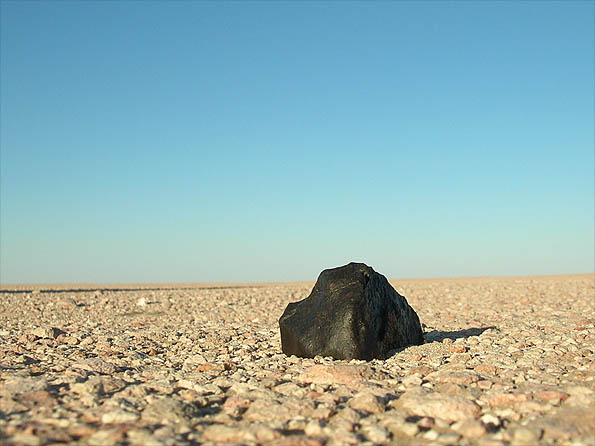
Meteorite find in situ on desert pavement, Rub' al Khali, Saudi Arabia. Probable chondrite, weight 408.5 grams (0.901 lb; 14.41 oz).

In 1999, meteorite hunters discovered that the desert in southern and central Oman were also favorable for the collection of many specimens. The gravel plains in the Dhofar and Al Wusta regions of Oman, south of the sandy deserts of the Rub' al Khali, had yielded about 5,000 meteorites as of mid-2009. Included among these are a large number of lunar and Martian meteorites, making Oman a particularly important area both for scientists and collectors. Early expeditions to Oman were mainly done by commercial meteorite dealers, however, international teams of Omani and European scientists have also now collected specimens.

The recovery of meteorites from Oman is currently prohibited by national law, but a number of international hunters continue to remove specimens now deemed national treasures. This new law provoked a small international incident, as its implementation preceded any public notification of such a law, resulting in the prolonged imprisonment of a large group of meteorite hunters, primarily from Russia, but whose party also consisted of members from the US as well as several other European countries.

== In human affairs ==
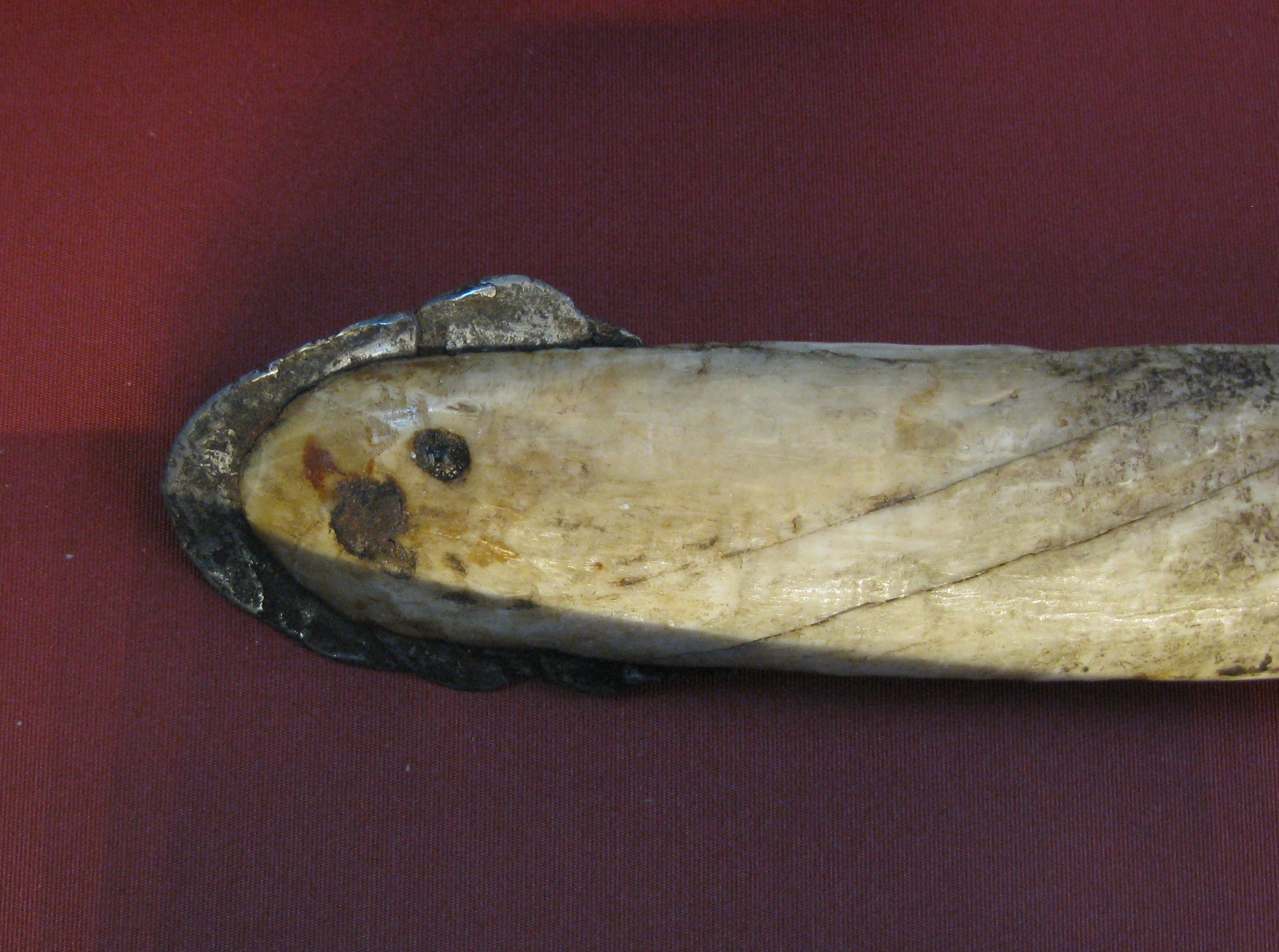
A lance made from a narwhal tusk with a meteorite iron head

Meteorites have figured into human culture since their earliest discovery as ceremonial or religious objects, as the subject of writing about events occurring in the sky and as a source of peril. The oldest known iron artifacts are nine small beads hammered from meteoritic iron. They were found in northern Egypt and have been securely dated to 3200 BC.

=== Ceremonial or religious use ===
Although the use of the metal found in meteorites is also recorded in myths of many countries and cultures where the celestial source was often acknowledged, scientific documentation only began in the last few centuries.

Meteorite falls may have been the source of cultish worship. The cult in the Temple of Artemis at Ephesus, one of the Seven Wonders of the Ancient World, possibly originated with the observation and recovery of a meteorite that was understood by contemporaries to have fallen to the earth from Jupiter, the principal Roman deity. There are reports that a sacred stone was enshrined at the temple that may have been a meteorite.

The Black Stone set into the wall of the Kaaba has often been presumed to be a meteorite, but the little available evidence for this is inconclusive.

Some Native Americans treated meteorites as ceremonial objects. In 1915, a 61-kilogram (135 lb) iron meteorite was found in a Sinagua (c. 1100–1200 AD) burial cyst near Camp Verde, Arizona, respectfully wrapped in a feather cloth. A small pallasite was found in a pottery jar in an old burial found at Pojoaque Pueblo, New Mexico. Nininger reports several other such instances, in the Southwest US and elsewhere, such as the discovery of Native American beads of meteoric iron found in Hopewell burial mounds, and the discovery of the Winona meteorite in a Native American stone-walled crypt.

=== Historical writings ===
In medieval China during the Song dynasty, a meteorite strike event was recorded by Shen Kuo in 1064 AD near Changzhou. He reported "a loud noise that sounded like a thunder was heard in the sky; a giant star, almost like the moon, appeared in the southeast" and later finding the crater and the still-hot meteorite within, nearby.

Two of the oldest recorded meteorite falls in Europe are the Elbogen (1400) and Ensisheim (1492) meteorites. The German physicist, Ernst Florens Chladni, was the first to publish (in 1794) the idea that meteorites might be rocks that originated not from Earth, but from space. His booklet was "On the Origin of the Iron Masses Found by Pallas and Others Similar to it, and on Some Associated Natural Phenomena". In this he compiled all available data on several meteorite finds and falls concluded that they must have their origins in outer space. The scientific community of the time responded with resistance and mockery. It took nearly ten years before a general acceptance of the origin of meteorites was achieved through the work of the French scientist Jean-Baptiste Biot and the British chemist, Edward Howard. Biot's study, initiated by the French Academy of Sciences, was compelled by a fall of thousands of meteorites on 26 April 1803 from the skies of L'Aigle, France.

=== Striking people or property ===
Throughout history, many first- and second-hand reports speak of meteorites killing humans and other animals. One possible example, the Qingyang event, is from 1490 AD in China, which purportedly killed thousands of people. John Lewis has compiled some of these reports, and summarizes, "No one in recorded history has ever been killed by a meteorite in the presence of a meteoriticist and a medical doctor" and "reviewers who make sweeping negative conclusions usually do not cite any of the primary publications in which the eyewitnesses describe their experiences, and give no evidence of having read them".

Modern reports of meteorite strikes include:

- In 1954 in Sylacauga, Alabama. A 4-kilogram (8.8 lb) stone chondrite, the Hodges meteorite or Sylacauga meteorite, crashed through a roof and injured an occupant.
- In 1992 an approximately 3-gram (0.11 oz) fragment of the Mbale meteorite fall from Uganda struck a youth, causing no injury.
- In October 2021 a meteorite penetrated the roof of a house in Golden, British Columbia landing on an occupant's bed.

== Notable examples ==
=== Naming ===
Meteorites are always named for the places they were found, where practical, usually a nearby town or geographic feature. In cases where many meteorites were found in one place, the name may be followed by a number or letter (e.g., Allan Hills 84001 or Dimmitt (b)). The name designated by the Meteoritical Society is used by scientists, catalogers, and most collectors.

=== Terrestrial ===
- Allende – largest known carbonaceous chondrite (Chihuahua, Mexico, 1969).
- Allan Hills A81005 – First meteorite determined to be of lunar origin.
- Allan Hills 84001 – Mars meteorite that was claimed to prove the existence of life on Mars.
- The Bacubirito Meteorite (Meteorito de Bacubirito) – A meteorite estimated to weigh 20–30 short tons (18–27 t).
- Campo del Cielo – a group of iron meteorites associated with a crater field (of the same name) of at least 26 craters in West Chaco Province, Argentina. The total weight of meteorites recovered exceeds 100 tonnes.
- Canyon Diablo – Associated with Meteor Crater in Arizona.
- Cape York – One of the largest meteorites in the world. A 34-ton fragment called "Ahnighito", is exhibited at the American Museum of Natural History; the largest meteorite on exhibit in any museum.
- Gibeon – A large Iron meteorite in Namibia, created the largest known strewn field.
- Hoba – The largest known intact meteorite.
- Kaidun – An unusual carbonaceous chondrite.
- Mbosi meteorite – A 16-metric-ton ungrouped iron meteorite in Tanzania.
- Murchison – A carbonaceous chondrite found to contain nucleobases – the building block of life.
- Nōgata – The oldest meteorite whose fall can be dated precisely (to 19 May 861, at Nōgata)
- Orgueil – A famous meteorite due to its especially primitive nature and high presolar grain content.
- Sikhote-Alin – Massive iron meteorite impact event that occurred on 12 February 1947.
- Tucson Ring – Ring shaped meteorite, used by a blacksmith as an anvil, in Tucson AZ. Currently at the Smithsonian.
- Willamette – The largest meteorite ever found in the United States.
- 2007 Carancas impact event – On 15 September 2007, a stony meteorite that may have weighed as much as 4000 kilograms created a crater 13 meters in diameter near the village of Carancas, Peru.
- 2013 Russian meteor event – a 17-metre diameter, 10 000 ton asteroid hit the atmosphere above Chelyabinsk, Russia at 18 km/s around 09:20 local time (03:20 UTC) 15 February 2013, producing a very bright fireball in the morning sky. A number of small meteorite fragments have since been found nearby.

=== Extraterrestrial ===
- Bench Crater meteorite (Apollo 12, 1969) and the Hadley Rille meteorite (Apollo 15, 1971) − Fragments of asteroids were found among the samples collected on the Moon.
- Block Island meteorite and Heat Shield Rock – Discovered on Mars by Opportunity rover among four other iron meteorites. Two nickel-iron meteorites were identified by the Spirit rover. (See also: List of rocks on Mars)

=== Large impact craters ===
- Acraman crater in South Australia (90 kilometres (56 mi) diameter)
- Ames crater in Major County, Oklahoma 16 kilometres (9.9 mi) diameter
- Brent crater in northern Ontario (3.8 kilometres (2.4 mi) diameter)
- Chesapeake Bay impact crater (90 kilometres (56 mi) diameter)
- Chicxulub crater off the coast of Yucatán Peninsula (170 kilometres (110 mi) diameter)
- Clearwater Lakes a double crater impact in Québec, Canada (26 and 36 kilometres (16 and 22 mi) in diameter)
- Lonar crater in India (1.83 kilometres (1.14 mi) diameter)
- Lumparn in Åland, in the Baltic Sea (9 kilometres (5.6 mi) diameter)
- Manicouagan Reservoir in Québec, Canada (100 kilometres (62 mi) diameter)
- Manson crater in Iowa (38 kilometres (24 mi) crater is buried)
- Meteor Crater in Arizona, also known as "Barringer Crater", the first confirmed terrestrial impact crater. (1.2 kilometres (0.75 mi) diameter)
- Mjølnir impact crater in the Barents Sea (40 kilometres (25 mi) diameter)
- Nördlinger Ries crater in Bavaria, Germany (25 kilometres (16 mi) diameter)
- Popigai impact structure in Russia (100 kilometres (62 mi) diameter)
- Siljan Ring in Sweden, largest crater in Europe (52 kilometres (32 mi) diameter)
- Sudbury Basin in Ontario, Canada (250 kilometres (160 mi) diameter).
- Ungava Bay in Québec, Canada (260 by 320 kilometres (160 by 200 mi))
- Vredefort impact structure in South Africa, the largest known impact structure on Earth (300 kilometres (190 mi) diameter from an estimated 10 kilometres (6.2 mi) wide meteorite).

=== Disintegrating meteoroids ===
- Tunguska event in Siberia 1908 (no crater)
- Chelyabinsk event in Russia 2013 (no known crater)

== See also ==
- Atmospheric focusing
- Barringer Medal
- Glossary of meteoritics
- List of impact craters on Earth
- List of Martian meteorites
- List of meteorite minerals
- List of rocks on Mars
- List of possible impact structures on Earth
- List of individual rocks
- Meteor shower
- Meteorite find
- Meteoroid
- Panspermia
