= Nōgata meteorite =

Meteorite found in Japan

Nōgata
- Type: Chondrite
- Class: Ordinary chondrite
- Group: L6
- Country: Japan
- Region: Fukuoka Prefecture
- Coordinates: 33°43′N 130°45′E
- Observed fall: Yes
- Fall date: 19 May 861
- Found date: 19 May 861
- TKW: 472g

The Nōgata meteorite is an L6 chondrite meteorite fragment, found in Fukuoka Prefecture, Japan. It is believed to be the oldest fragment associated with a sighting of a meteor fall. Witnessed by a young boy on May 19, 861, who led others to the impact site, it was accepted as having come from the sky. It was analyzed and described by Masako Shima of the National Science Museum of Tokyo and accepted by the Nomenclature Committee of the Meteoritical Society in 1979. Shima published a complete analysis of the chemical makeup of the fragment in 1983. It is on display in a Shinto shrine in Nōgata.
