= Daubréelite =

Sulfide mineral

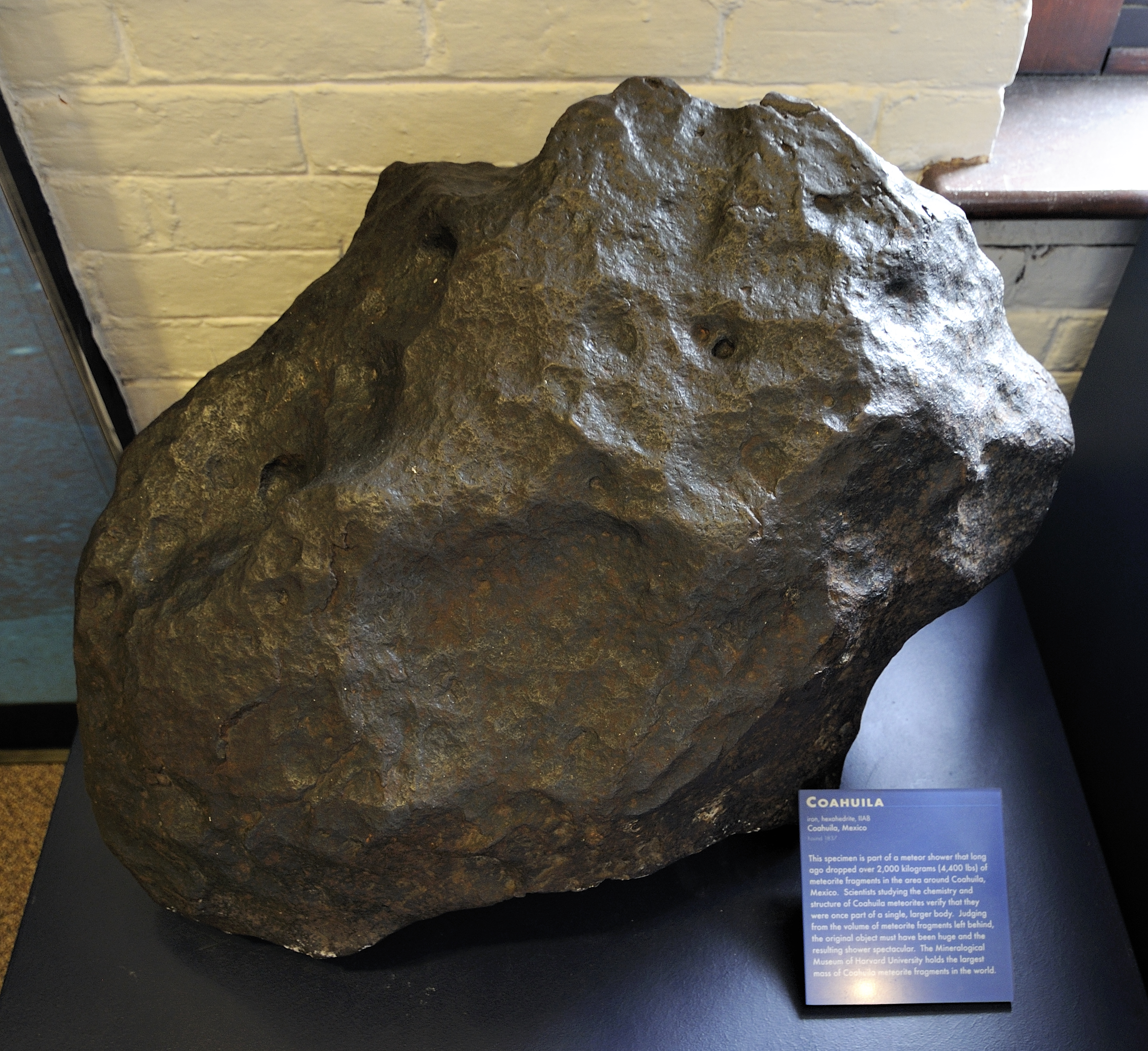
- Coahuila meteorite fragment ("type locality"), Mineralogical Museum, Natural History Museum, Harvard University

General
- Category: Sulfide mineral
- Formula: Fe^{2+}Cr^{3+}_{2}S_{4}
- IMA symbol: Dbr
- Strunz classification: 2.DA.05
- Dana classification: 02.10.01.11
- Crystal system: Cubic
- Crystal class: Hexoctahedral (m3̅m); H-M symbol: (4/m 3̅ 2/m)
- Space group: Fd3m
- Unit cell: a = 9.966 Å; Z = 8

Identification
- Color: Black
- Crystal habit: Massive, platy aggregates, exsolution lamellae in troilite
- Cleavage: Distinct
- Fracture: Uneven
- Tenacity: Brittle
- Mohs scale hardness: 4.5–5
- Luster: Metallic
- Streak: Brown or black
- Diaphaneity: Opaque

Daubréelite is a rare sulfide mineral. It crystallizes with cubic symmetry and has chemical composition of Fe^{2+}Cr^{3+}_{2}S_{4}. It usually occurs as black platy aggregates.

== Naming and history ==
Daubréelite was named after the French mineralogist, petrologist and meteoriticist Gabriel Auguste Daubrée. The mineral was first described in 1876 in the American Journal of Science. Its type locality is the Coahuila meteorite, Bolsom de Mapimí, Coahuila, Mexico.

== Classification ==
In the Nickel-Strunz classification daubréelite is part of the "Sulfides and Sulfosalts" and further a "metal sulfide with a metal-sulfide ratio of 3:4 and 2:3".

== Occurrences ==
Daubréelite is found in iron meteorites as an inclusion in meteoric iron (kamacite and taenite). Further paragenetic minerals are alabandine, enstatite, graphite, plagioclase and schreibersite.

According to one source daubréelite has been described from 34 localities. Some notable examples being the Hoba meteorite and the Canyon Diablo meteorite.

The mineral was also found in the Hadley Rille meteorite which was retrieved by the Apollo 15 mission in the Rima Hadley (Mare Imbrium).

== Crystallography ==
Daubréelite crystallizes with cubic symmetry with the space group Fd3̅m (4/m 3̅ 2/m). There are 8 formula units in one primitive cell.

== See also ==
- Glossary of meteoritics
