= Mbosi meteorite =

Meteorite found in Tanzania

Mbozi
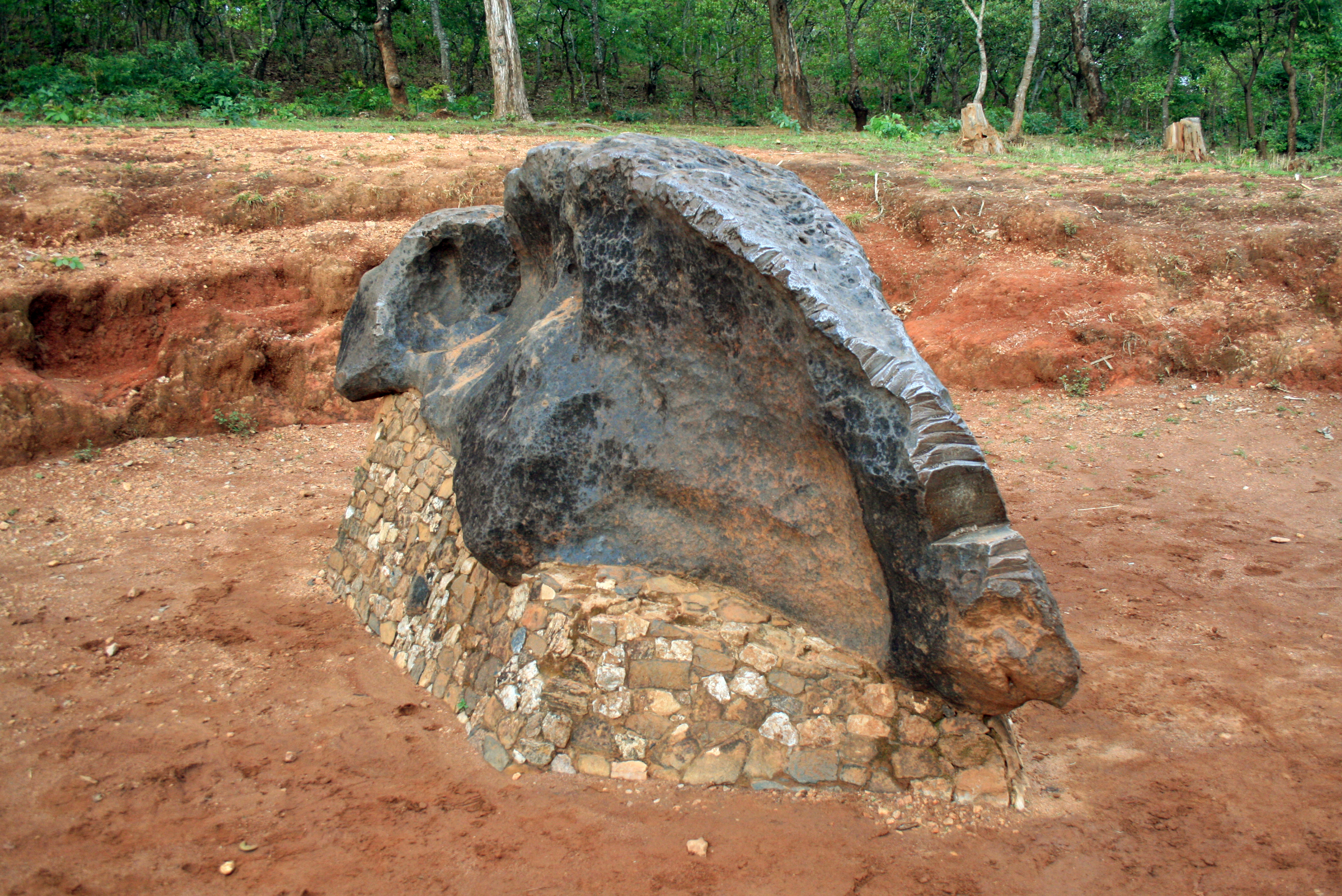
- Main mass near Mbeya, Tanzania
- Type: Iron
- Group: Ungrouped
- Composition: Meteoric iron (8 % Ni), Silicate inclusions
- Country: Tanzania
- Region: Songwe
- Coordinates: 09°06′28″S 33°02′15″E (Note: Coordinates were verified using satellite images.)
- Observed fall: No
- Found date: 1930
- TKW: 16 metric tons (16 long tons; 18 short tons)
- Alternative names: Kimwondo (local name)
- Related media on Wikimedia Commons

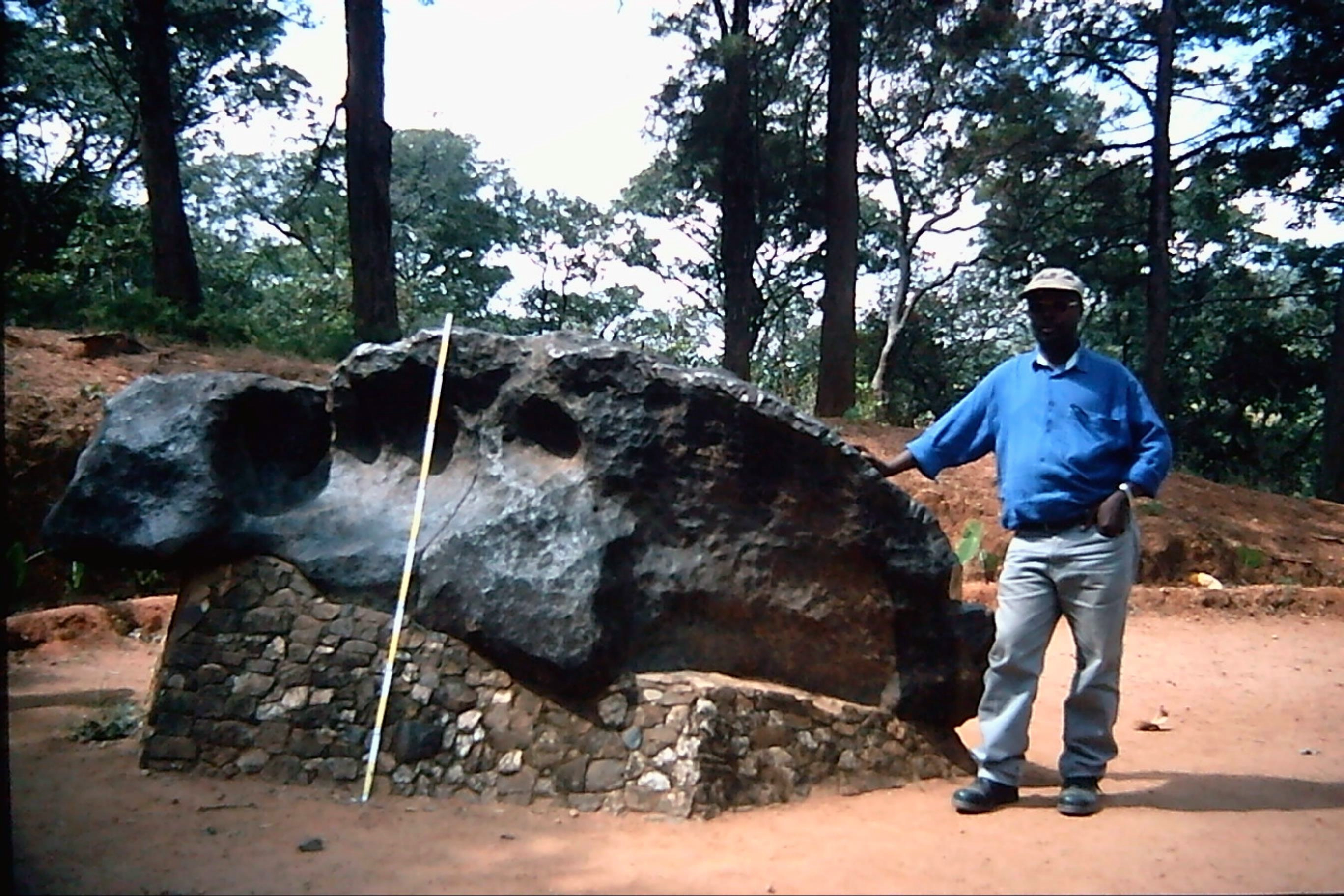
Mbozi Meteorite, Tanzania in 2013.

Mbozi is an ungrouped iron meteorite found in Tanzania. It is one of the world's largest meteorites, variously estimated as the fourth-largest to the eighth-largest, it is located near the city of Mbeya in Tanzania's southern highlands. The meteorite is 3 metres (9.8 ft) long, 1 metre (3 ft 3 in) high, and weighs an estimated 16 metric tons (16 long tons; 18 short tons).

== Discovery and naming ==
Mbosi has been long known to locals, who call it kimondo, yet became known to outsiders only in the 1930s. It is named after Mbozi District, in Mbeya (Tanzania). When it was discovered by scientists in 1930 it didn't have a crater.

== Mineralogy ==
Mbosi consists of meteoric iron with small silicate inclusions. The meteoric iron has a nickel concentration of 8% and shows Widmanstätten pattern. The Germanium-Gallium ratio is larger than 10, which can also be seen in meteorites of the IIF iron meteorite group and the Eagle station pallasites.

The silicate inclusions have a core and mantle structure in thin section. The mantle is made from glass, that partially devitrified into pyroxene and plagioclase. The core consists of quartz.

== Classification ==
Currently classified as an ungrouped iron meteorite Mbozi shows similarities with IIF iron meteorites, the Eagle station pallasites and a few other ungrouped iron meteorite (e.g. Bocaiuva meteorite).

== See also ==
- Glossary of meteoritics
- List of largest meteorites on Earth
