= Zaisho =

Meteorite found in Japan

Zaisho meteorite
- Type: Stony-iron
- Class: Pallasite
- Group: Pallasite main group, anomalous
- Country: Japan
- Region: Shikoku
- Coordinates: 33°42′N 133°48′E
- Observed fall: Yes
- Fall date: 1898
- TKW: 330 grams (12 oz)

Zaisho is the name of a stony-iron pallasite meteorite whose fall in Japan in February 1898 was recorded by observers on the ground. Zaisho made landfall in the city of Kami, located in the prefecture of Kōchi on Shikoku Island. Zaisho weighs approximately 0.33kg (12oz) and exhibits a rare composition of primarily iron rich phosphoran olivine, and pyroxene. Zaisho also contains traces of stanfieldite, farringtonite, troilite, schreibersite, chromite, and mg-phosphate, albeit in smaller amounts. Notably, Zaisho is also one of two confirmed meteorite landings to take place on the island of Shikoku, and as of 2019 it remains one of only four known pallasite falls, along with Marjalahti, Mineo and Omolon. Currently, access to Zaisho is not available to the public as the main mass of the meteorite is being held in a private collection.

== See also ==
- Glossary of meteoritics
