= Huckitta (meteorite) =

Meteorite found in Northern Territory, Australia

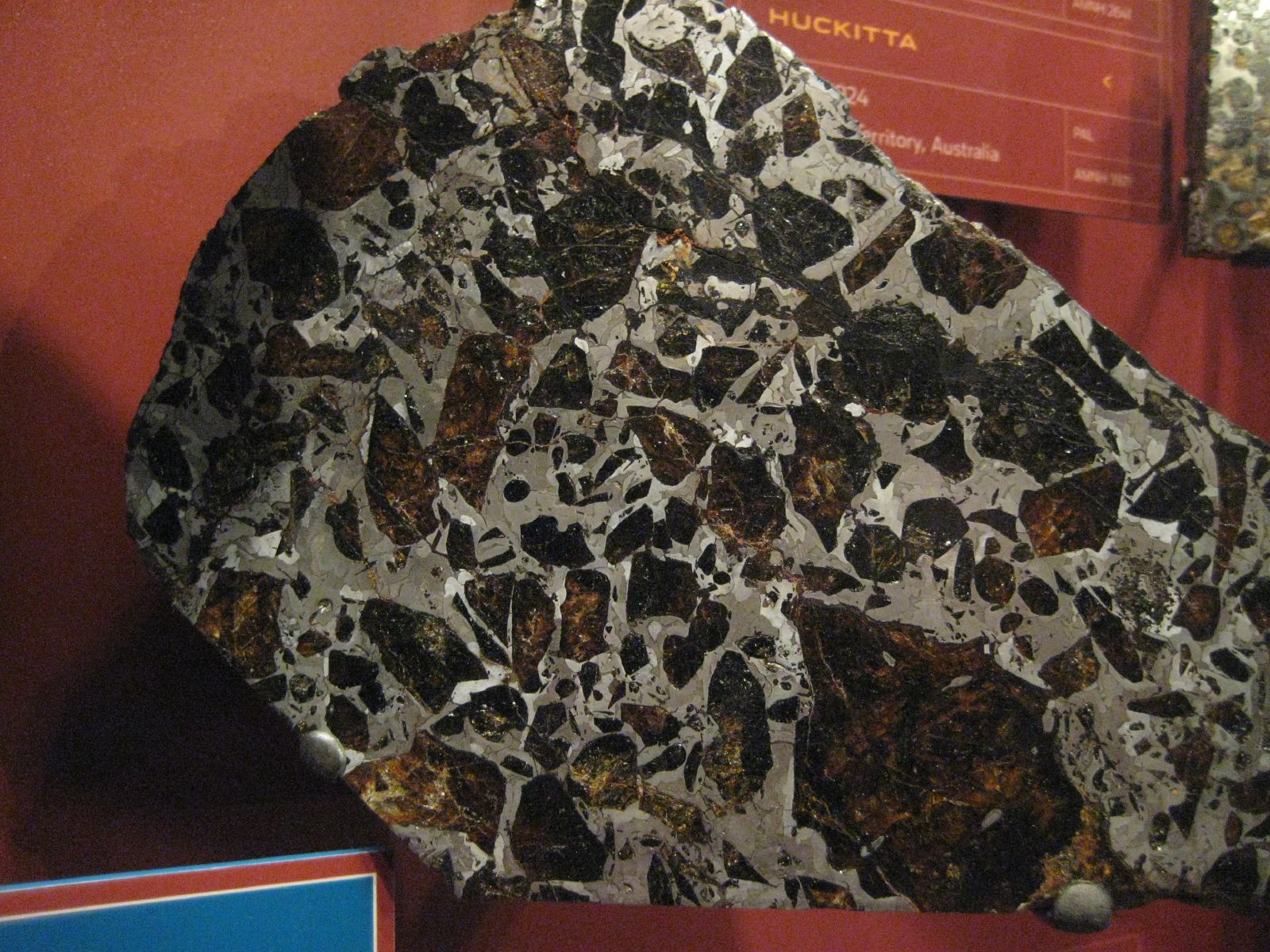
- Type: Stony-iron
- Structural classification: Medium octahedrite
- Class: Pallasite
- Group: Main Group Pallasite
- Composition: metal: 7.79% Ni, 26 ppm Ga, 65ppm Ge, 0.94ppm Ir
- Country: Australia
- Region: Northern Territory
- Coordinates: 22°22′S 135°46′E
- Observed fall: No
- Fall date: Prehistory
- Found date: 1924
- TKW: 2300 kg
- Related media on Wikimedia Commons

Huckitta is a pallasite meteorite recovered in 1937 from Huckitta Cattle Station in the Northern Territory of Australia.

== History ==
In 1924 a meteoritic mass of 1,084 grams (38.2 oz) was found by Herbert Basedow on Burt Plain (23°33′S, 133°52′E), about 17 kilometres (11 mi) north of Alice Springs. This mass was called Alice Springs. In July 1937, the main mass of 1,411.5 kilograms (3,112 lb) was recovered by Cecil Madigan at Huckitta (22°22′S, 135°46′E). Over 900 kilograms (2,000 lb) of iron shale was also found. The Alice Springs meteorite was then paired with the main mass and considered a transported fragment. Today the location of the site where the main mass was found is on Arapunya Cattle Station, which had been part of Huckitta Cattle Station but was excised from it after the meteorite had been recovered.

== Composition and classification ==
It is a pallasite related to Main Group of pallasites. This pallasite is severely weathered: almost all of the metal is highly oxidized and transformed mainly into maghemite and goethite, and the olivine crystals are often altered. Sometimes it is called an anomalous Main Group pallasite because, compared to other Main Group pallasites, it has rather high Ge and Ga contents, higher Pt, W, Ir, and lower Au content.

== Specimens ==
- Main mass, Adelaide Planetarium, University of South Australia, Adelaide
- 4.3 kilograms (9.5 lb), Monnig collection, Fort Worth, Texas
- 2.2 kilograms (4.9 lb), Arizona State University, Tempe
- 1 kilogram (2.2 lb), Natural History Museum, London
- 733 grams (25.9 oz), Max Planck Institute, Mainz
- 403 grams (14.2 oz), National Museum of Natural History, Washington, D.C.
- 352 grams (12.4 oz), Field Museum of Natural History, Chicago

== See also ==
- Glossary of meteoritics
- Meteorite
- Pallasite
