= Brenham (meteorite) =

Pallasite meteorite found near Haviland, Kansas, U.S.

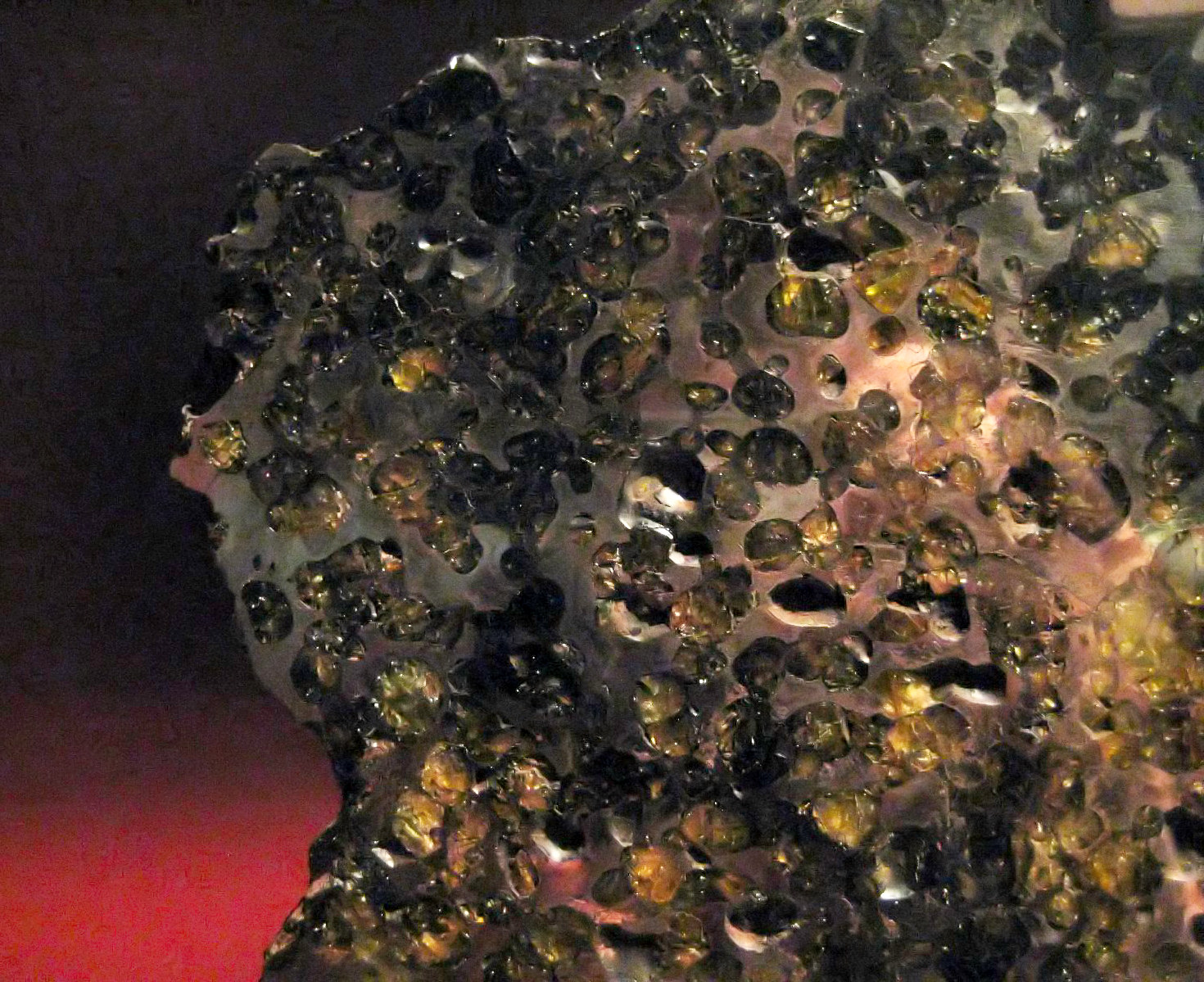
- Type: Stony–iron
- Class: Pallasite
- Group: Anomalous Pallasite (Pallasite-an)
- Composition: 8.5% Ni, 21.5 ppm Ga, 55.5 ppm Ge, 0.023 ppm Ir
- Country: United States
- Region: Kansas
- Coordinates: 37°34′57″N 99°9′49″W
- Observed fall: No
- Fall date: 10,000–20,000 years ago
- Found date: 1882
- TKW: 4.3 tons
- Related media on Wikimedia Commons

Brenham is a pallasite meteorite found near Haviland, a small town in Kiowa County, Kansas, United States. Pallasites are a type of stony–iron meteorite that when cut and polished show yellowish olivine (peridot) crystals. The Brenham meteorite is associated with the Haviland Crater.

== History ==
In 1949, a collector named H.O. Stockwell discovered a mass of 453.6 kilograms (1,000 lb), known at the time as "The World's Largest Pallasite Meteorite." It was found and excavated using hand tools, on the Ellis Peck farm, east of Greensburg, Kansas. Under the name The Space Wanderer this mass is on display at The Big Well in Greensburg, Kansas.

== Classification and composition ==
Brenham is an anomalous pallasite (Pallasite-an).

== Specimens ==
In October 2005, geologist Philip Mani and meteorite hunter Steve Arnold, searching on a farm in Kiowa County, located and recovered the largest fragment ever found of Brenham: a single pallasite mass of 650 kilograms (1,430 lb). This specimen is an oriented pallasite, meaning that its shape caused it to maintain a stable orientation during entry into the atmosphere instead of tumbling, and the third largest pallasite of this type found in the world.

The 650 kilograms (1,430 lb) mass is currently housed in a private collection in Texas. The pallasite was put up for auction in April 2016 and was exhibited at the Tucson Gem & Mineral Show in 2006 and was also on display at:

- The Fort Worth Museum of Science and History (2006)
- The Exploration Place in Wichita, Kansas (2006 & 2007)
- Kansas City Union Station (2007)
- Center for Earth & Space Science Center in Tyler, Texas (2011)
- U.S. Space and Rocket Center, Space Mania, Tel Aviv, Israel (2013)
- Space Center Houston (NASA) (2015)

A large collection of Brenham meteorites, along with numerous fragments weighing a total of 8,500 pounds, were once housed at the now-closed Kansas Meteorite Museum and Nature Center in Haviland, Kansas.

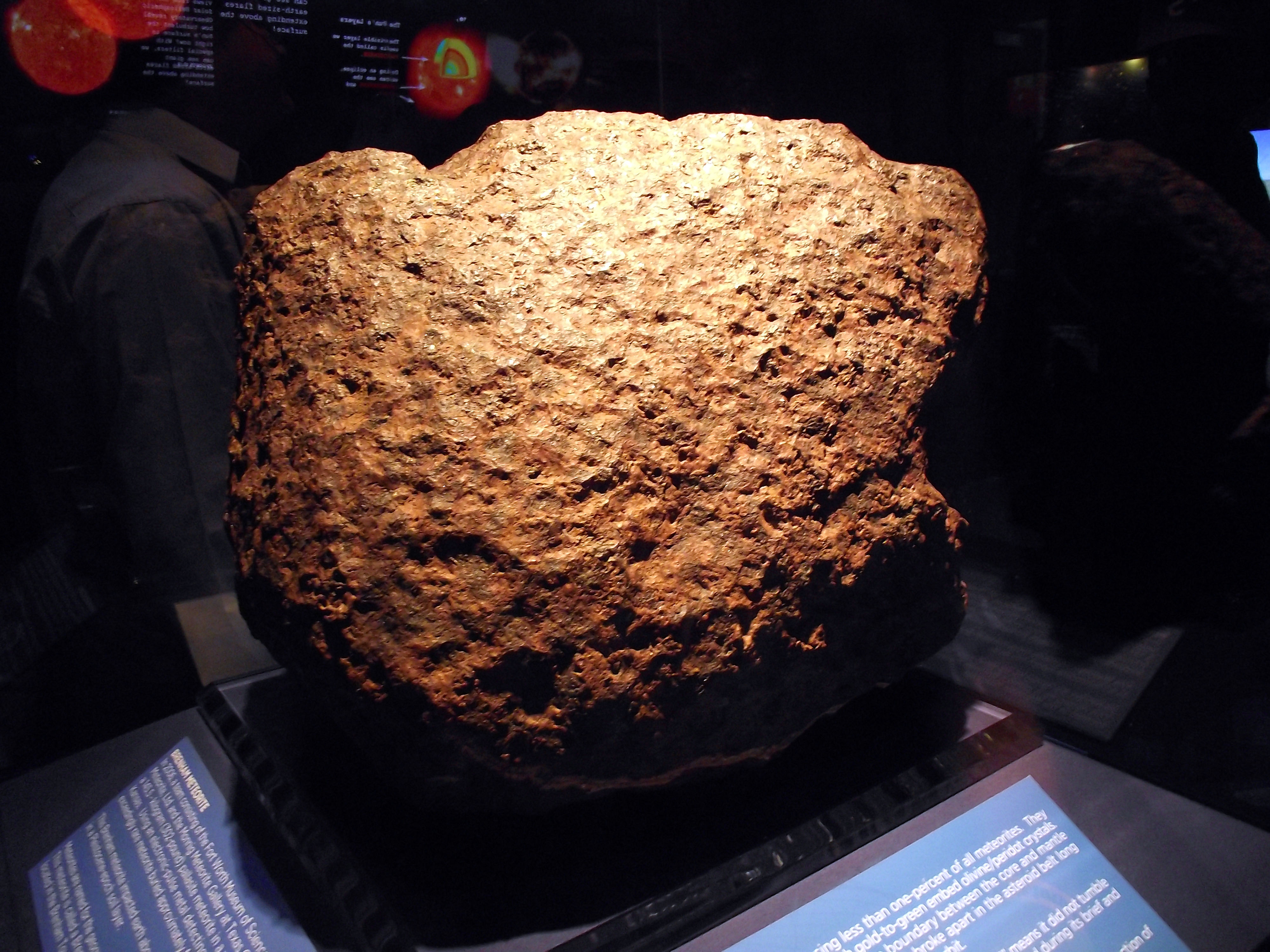
Fragment housed in the Fort Worth Museum of Science and History

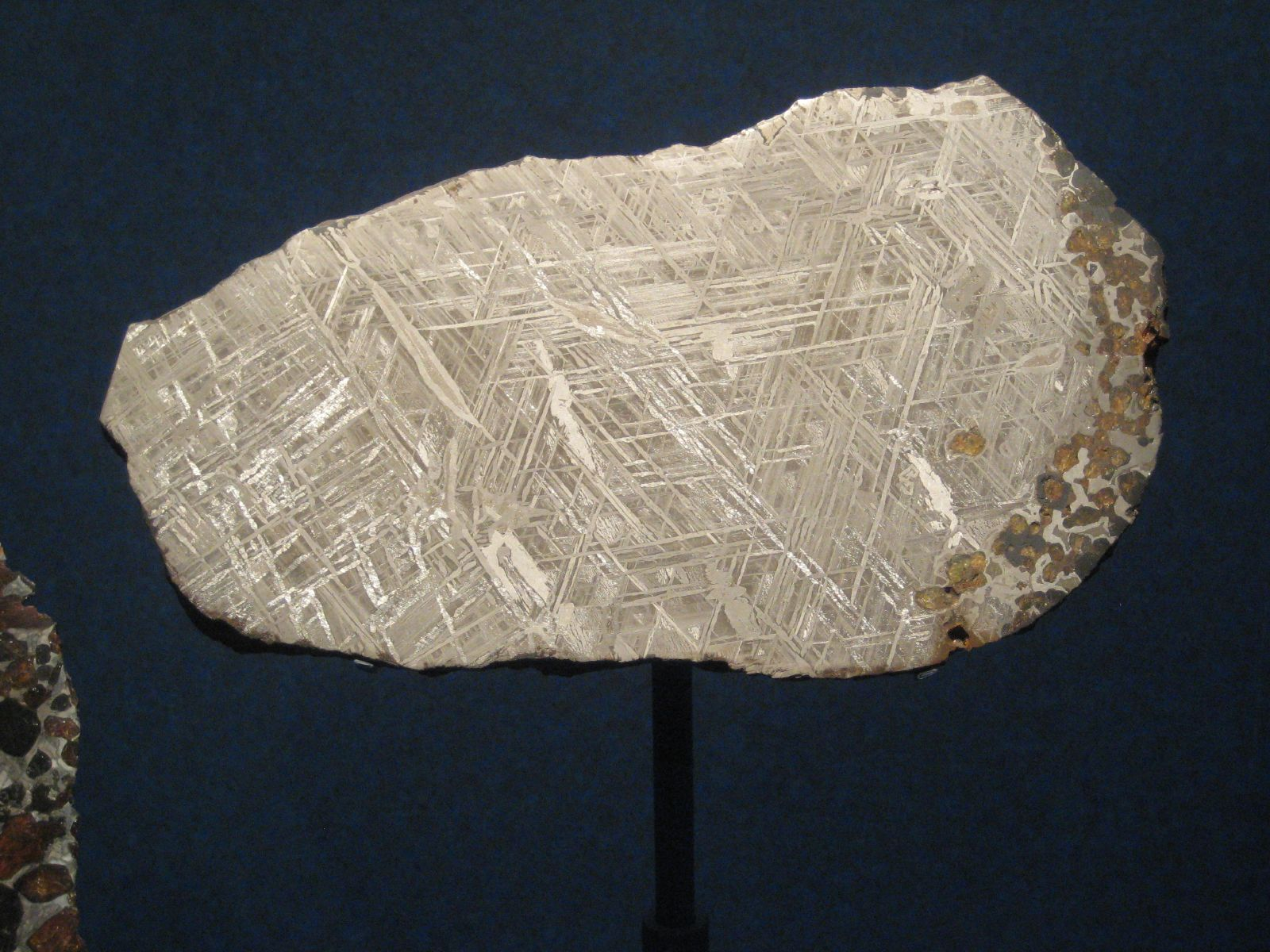
Specimen almost olivine-less

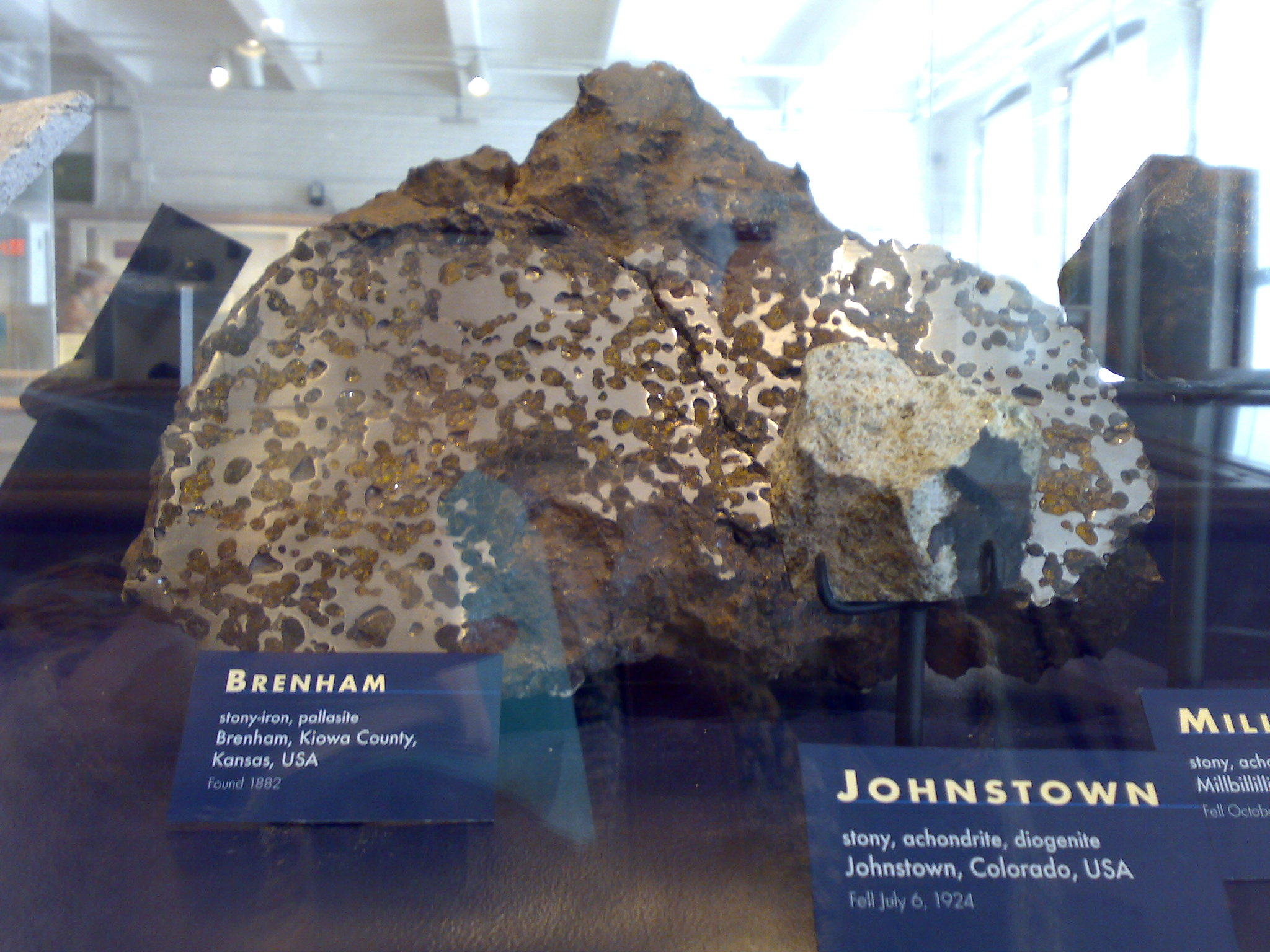
Small slice at the Harvard Museum of Natural History

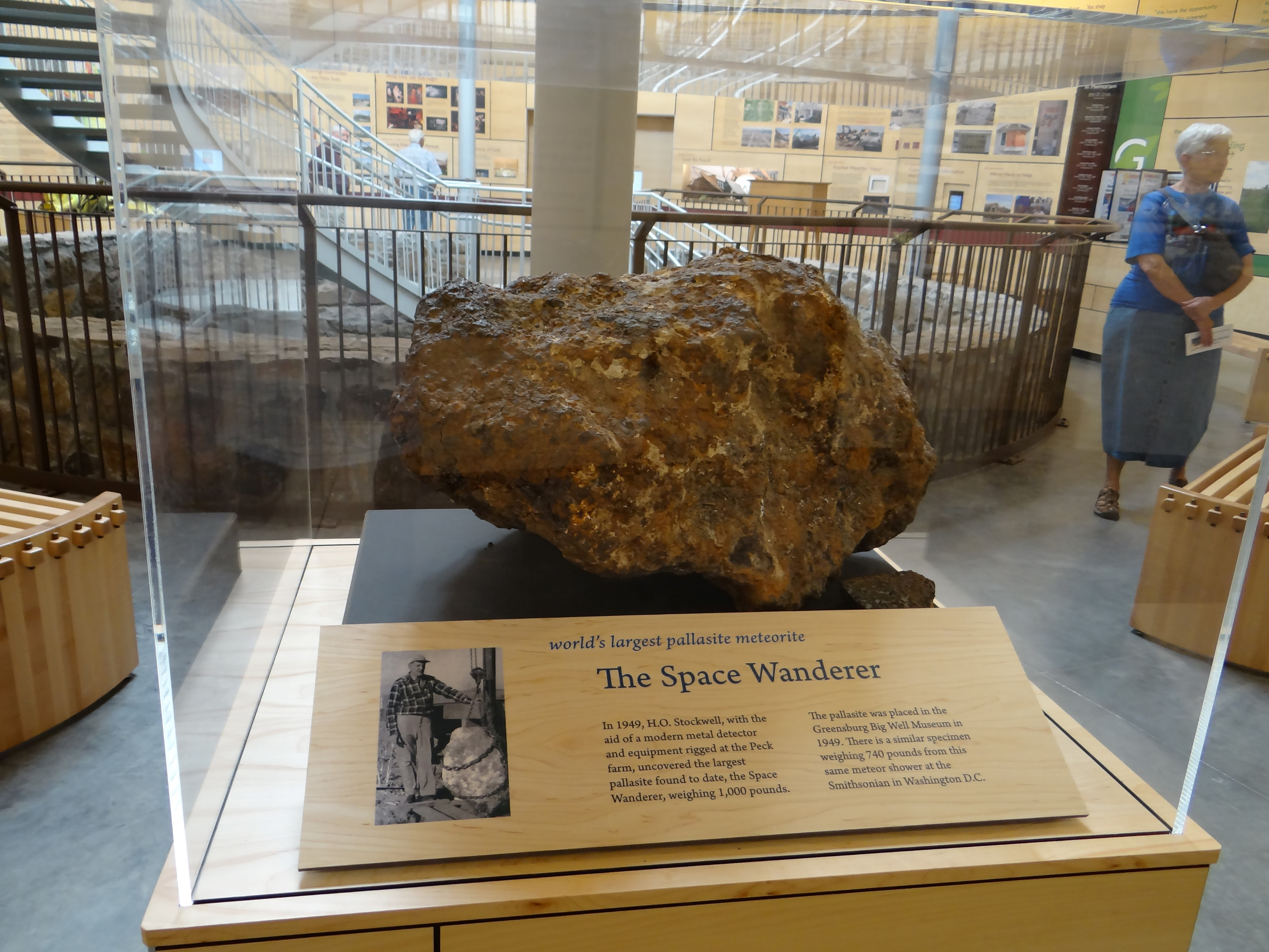
Meteorite at Big Well museum in Greensburg, Kansas

== See also ==
- Glossary of meteoritics
