= Brahin (meteorite) =

Meteorite found in Belarus

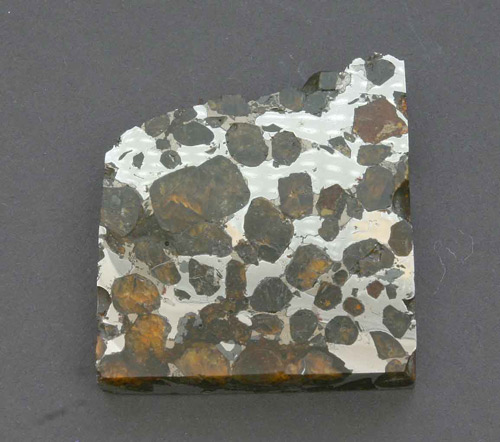
- A small Brahin slice
- Type: Stony-iron
- Structural classification: Medium octahedrite
- Class: Pallasite
- Group: Main Group Pallasite
- Composition: 37.18 wt% olivine metal: 91% Fe, 8.38% Ni crystals 36.5 % SiO_{2}; 13.7 % FeO; 43.2 % MgO; 0.3 % MnO; 3.82 % P_{2}O_{5}
- Country: Belarus
- Region: Gomel
- Coordinates: 52°30′N 30°20′E
- Observed fall: No
- Found date: 1807
- TKW: >1050 kg
- Strewn field: Yes
- Related media on Wikimedia Commons

Brahin is a meteorite pallasite found in 1810. This is the second meteorite ever found in Russia (nowadays Belarus). Sometimes it is also called Bragin.

== History ==
In 1807 two masses of 80 kilograms (180 lb) and 20 kilograms (44 lb) were found by farmers of Kaporenki, a village in the district of Bragin. The meteorites were sent to scientists by the administrator of the district: Graf Rakitsky, State Advisor and Ex Honorio Inspector of The Schools Of Rechitsky Uezd. Since 1807 several masses were recovered from the site.

During World War II, samples of Brahin were stolen in Kiev by German soldiers and some samples disappeared also in Minsk.

In 2002 a single mass of 227 kilograms (500 lb) was found at a depth of 3 meters at the northern end of Brahin strewnfield.

== Composition and classification ==
Brahin is a Main Group pallasite, with angular shaped olivine embedded in an iron-nickel matrix. Olivine crystals represent about 37% of the weight of the meteorite.

Pallasites are not common; they compose only 1.8% of all known meteorites. It has been proposed that pallasites represents the interface between the stone mantle and the metal core of differentiated asteroids.

== Strewn field ==
Meteorites were found in a zone about 15 kilometres (9.3 mi) long and 3 kilometres (1.9 mi) wide crossed by the Dnieper River.

The area was contaminated in 1986 during the Chernobyl disaster and falls now in the Periodic Control Zone. Post-accident recovered meteorites are safe and not contaminated because the radiation affects only the first few inches of soil, nevertheless meteorite hunting in the area is not entirely safe.

The official total known weight is 1,050 kilograms (2,310 lb), but it is probably underestimated.

== See also ==
- Glossary of meteoritics
