= Esquel (meteorite) =

Meteorite found in Argentina

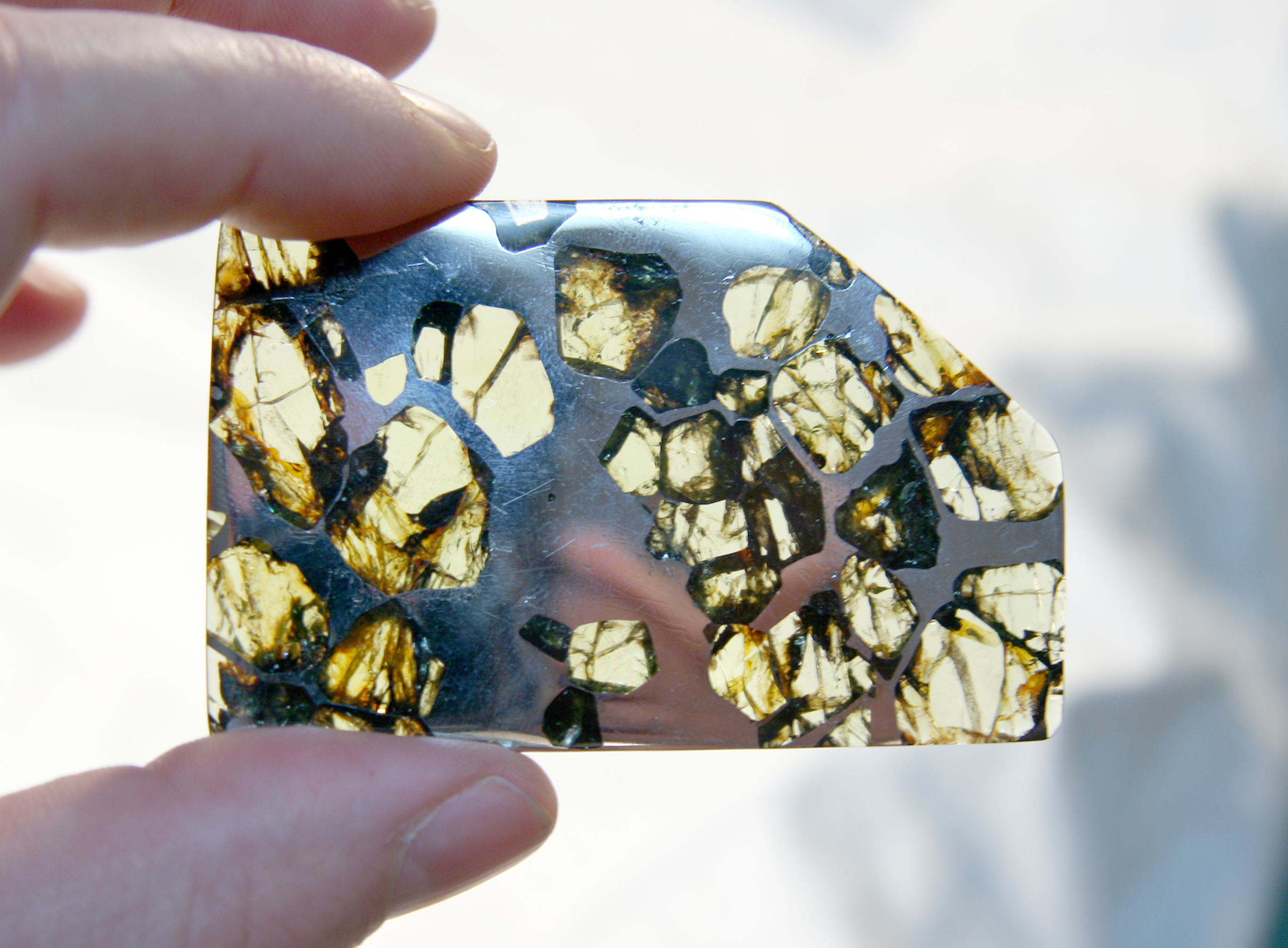
- The slice shows the crystals' transparency
- Type: Stony–iron
- Class: Pallasite
- Group: Main Group Pallasite (MGP)
- Composition: 8.5% Ni, 21.5 ppm Ga, 55.5 ppm Ge, 0.023 ppm Ir
- Country: Argentina
- Region: Esquel, Chubut
- Coordinates: 42°54′S 71°20′W
- Observed fall: No
- Found date: 1951
- TKW: 755 kg
- Related media on Wikimedia Commons

Esquel is a meteorite found near Esquel, a Patagonian town in the northwest part of the province of Chubut in Argentina. It is a pallasite, a type of stony–iron meteorite that when cut and polished shows yellowish olivine (peridot) crystals.

In 1951 a farmer uncovered a meteorite in an unknown location near Esquel while digging a hole for a water tank. The meteorite was purchased from the finders and taken to the United States in 1992 by meteorite expert Robert Haag. The Esquel pallasite is known worldwide among collectors and the meteoritical scientific community. Esquel is regarded as one of the most beautiful meteorites ever found and is also one of the most desirable pallasites among meteorite collectors. It is a main group pallasite (MGP).

== Specimens ==
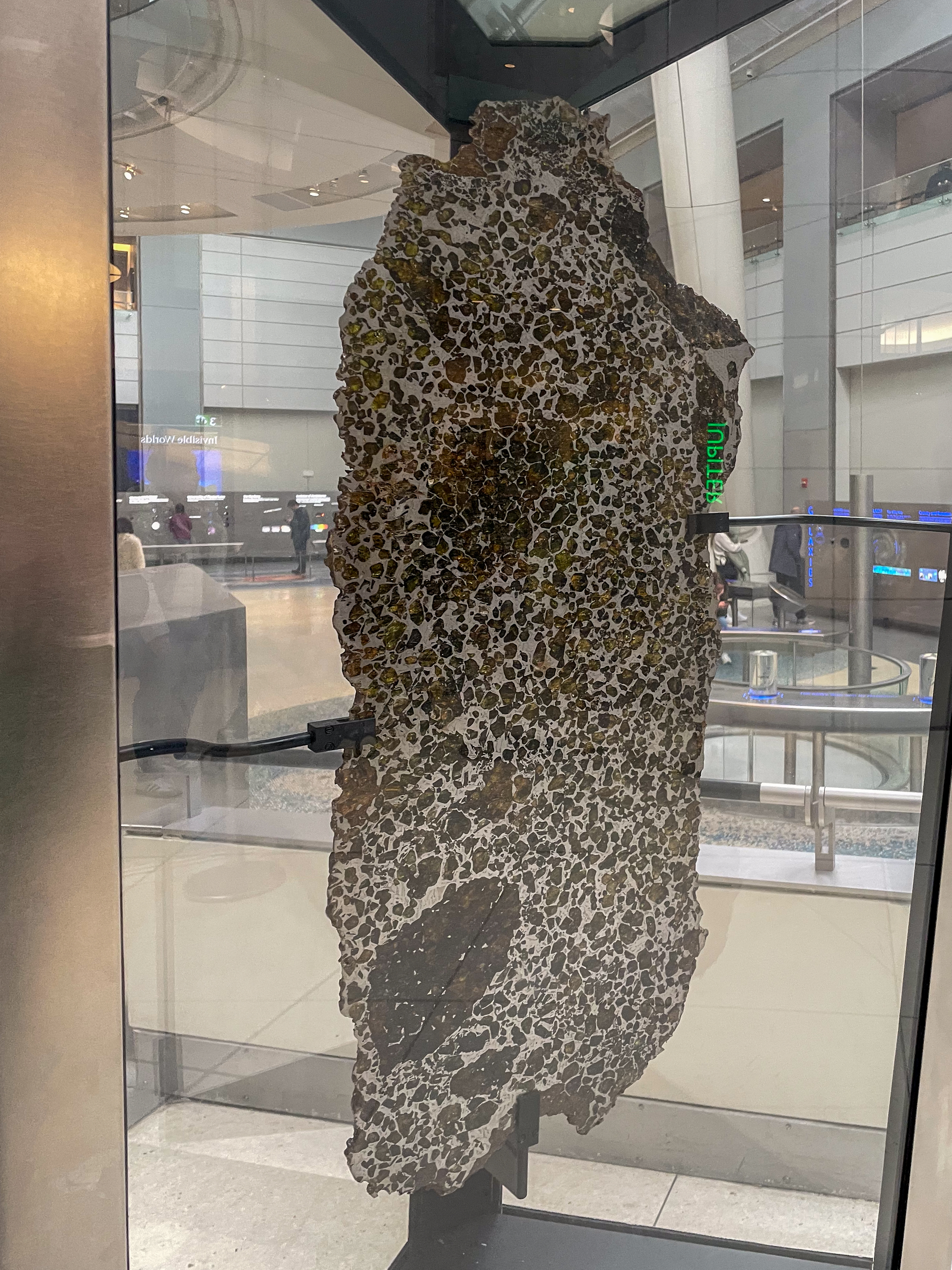
A large piece of Esquel on display at the American Museum of Natural History

The Meteoritical Bulletin no. 29 (1964) reports a main mass of "about 1500 kg". However O. A. Turone claimed a main mass weight of 755 kilograms (1,664 lb). Robert Haag, the buyer of the main mass, reported a weight of 680 kilograms (1,500 lb). Almost all of the Esquel ever found on the market is cut from his piece.

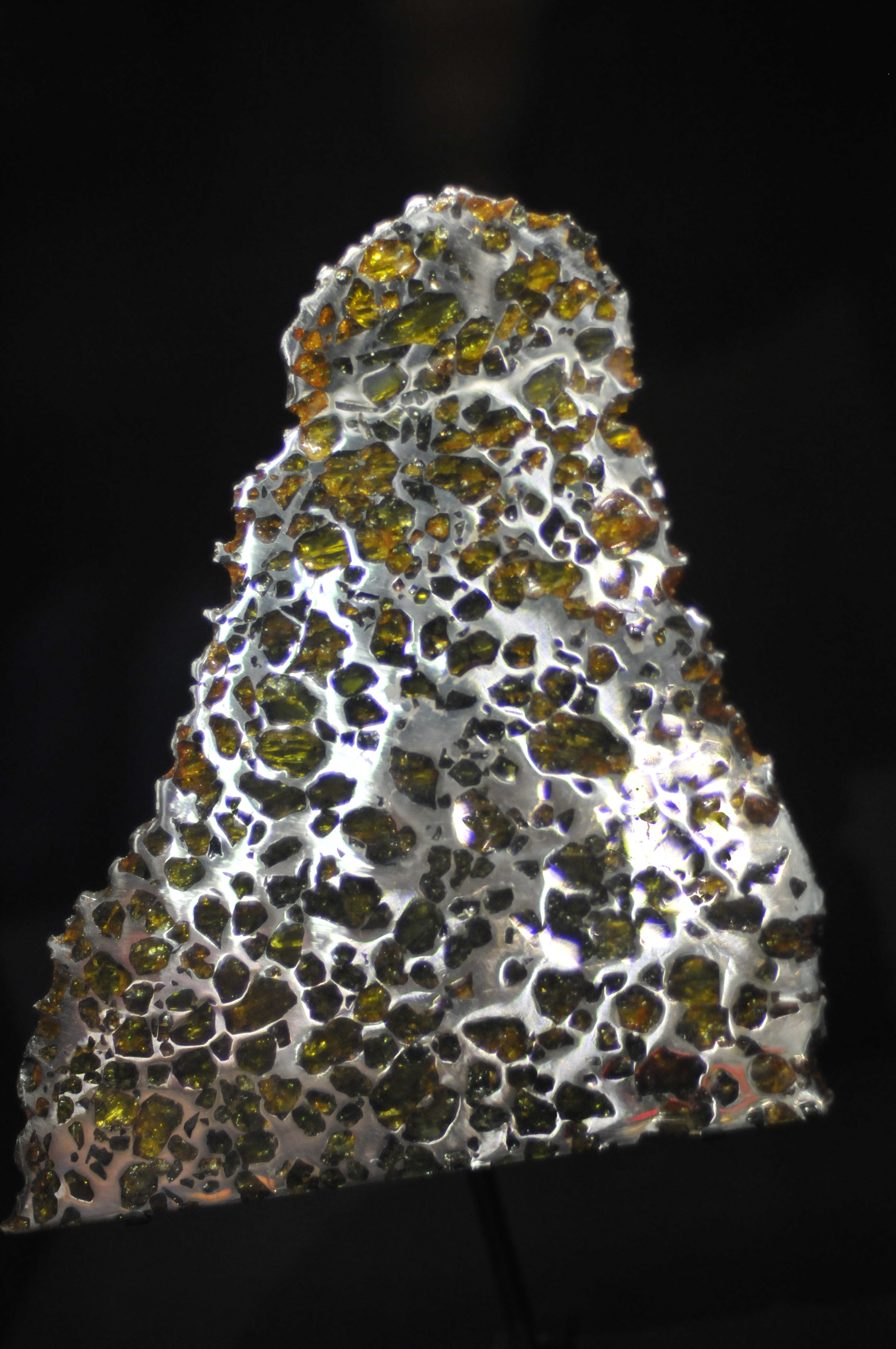
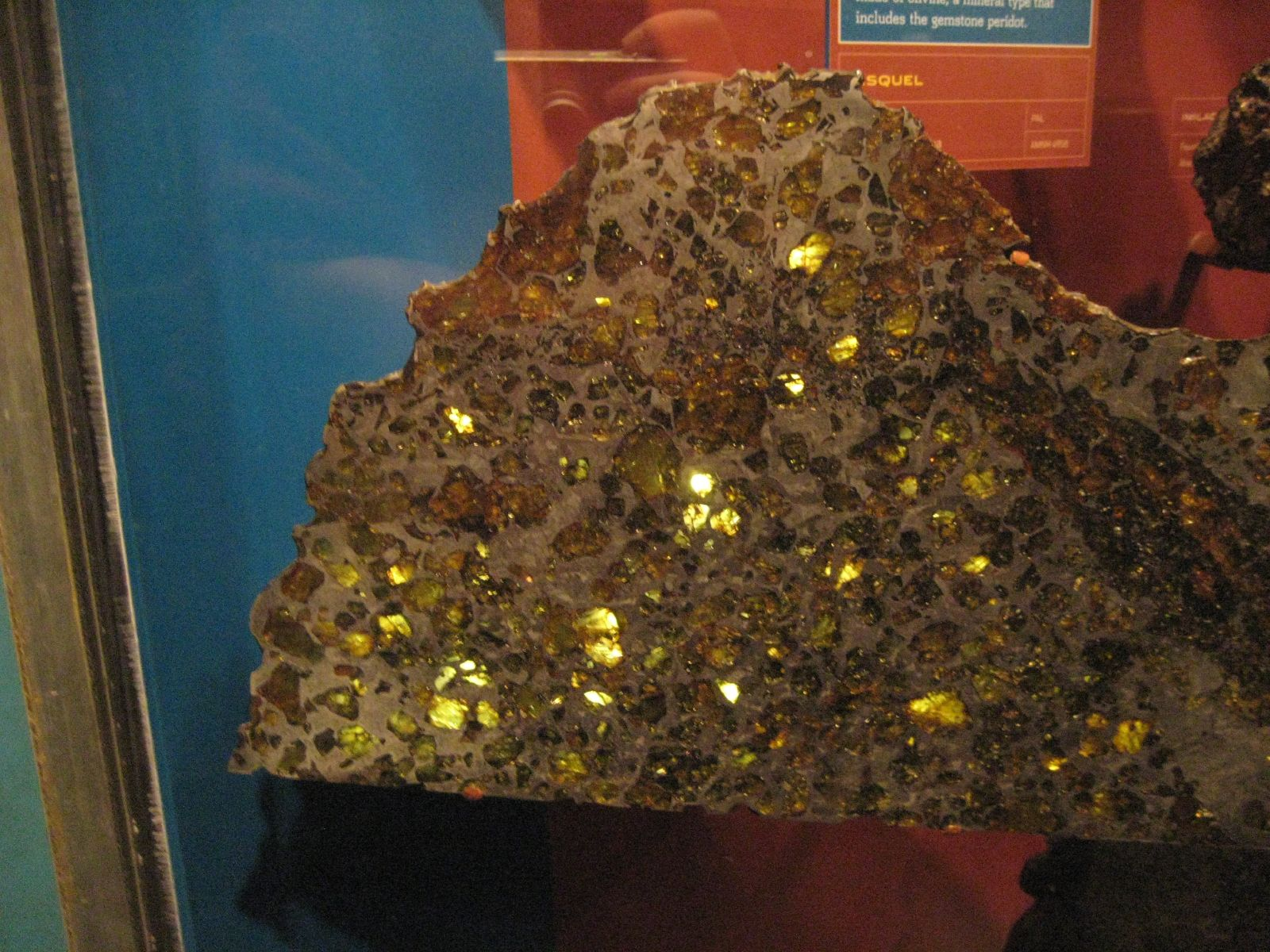
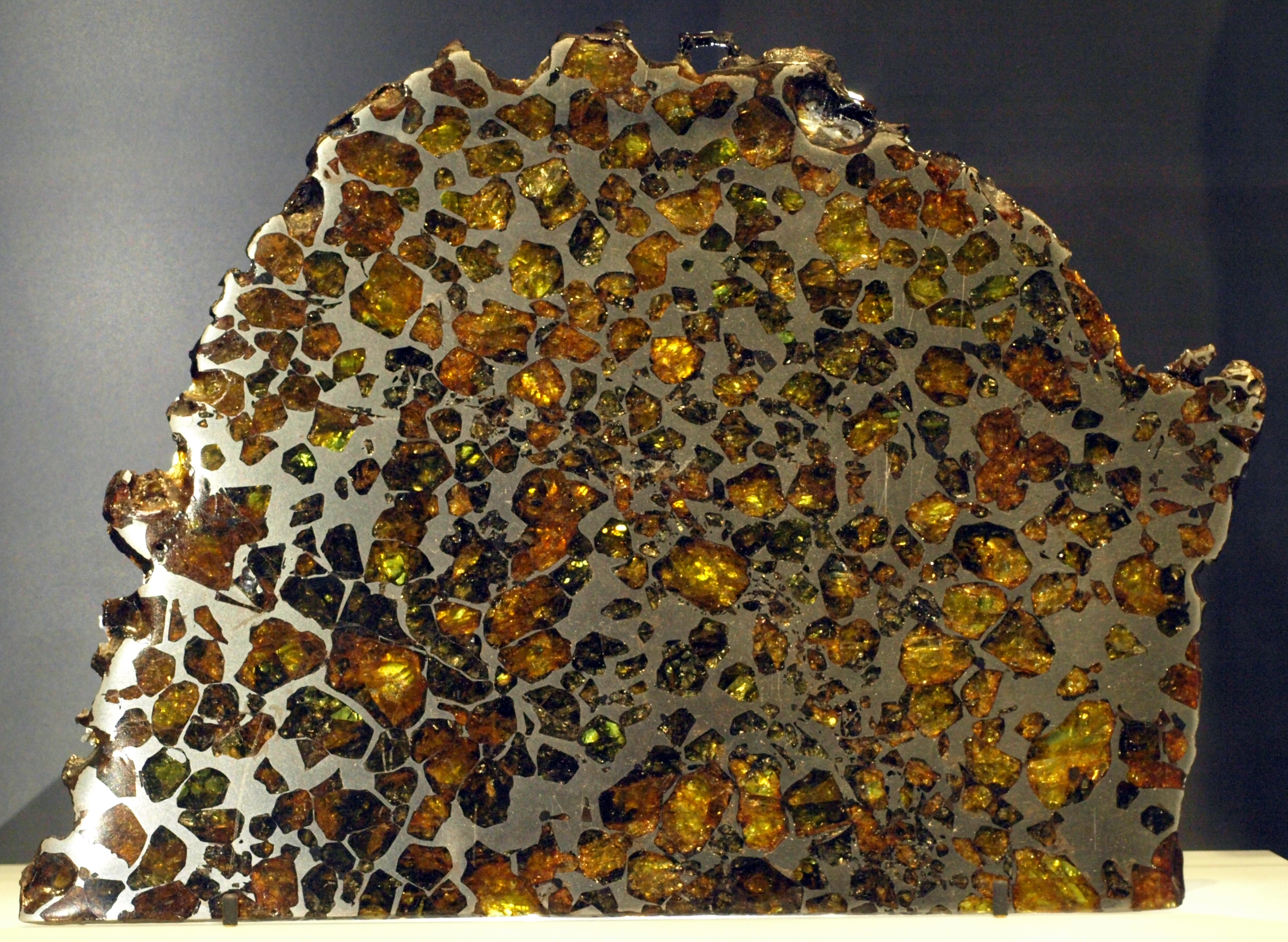
Polished slices of the stony-iron Esquel pallasite: at the Canadian Museum of Nature (left), at the American Museum of Natural History (middle) and encased yellow-green olivine crystals in the iron-nickel matrix are clearly visible (right).

== See also ==
- Glossary of meteoritics
