= Pallasovka (meteorite) =

Pallasite meteorite found in southern Russia

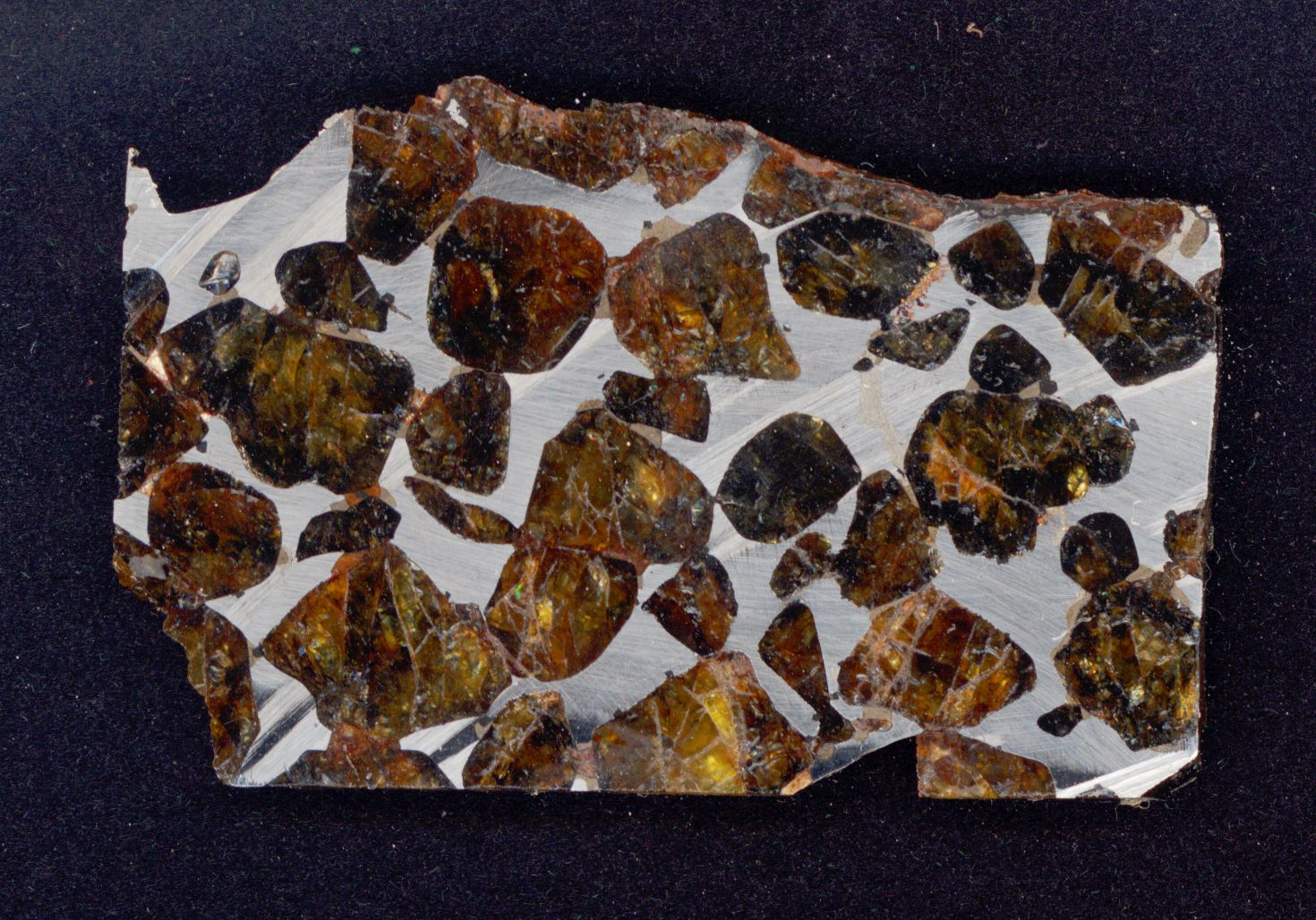
- Type: Stony-iron
- Class: Pallasite
- Group: Main Group Pallasite (anomalous)
- Composition: Olivine: Fe/Mn = 45.2, Fe/Mg = 0.14; Metal: Fe 86 wt%, Ni 13.1 wt%, Ir 0.12 ppm, Au 2.8 ppm, Pt 3.2 ppm, Ga 22.5 ppm, Ge 24.9 ppm
- Country: Russia
- Region: Volgograd Oblast
- Coordinates: 49°52′0″N 46°36′42″E
- Observed fall: No
- Found date: July 1990
- TKW: 198 kg

Pallasovka is a pallasite meteorite found in 1990 near the town of Pallasovka, Russia.

== History ==
One single mass of 198 kilograms (437 lb) was found 27.5 kilometres (17.1 mi) from the town of Pallasovka by N. F. Kharitonov (a local resident) on a dike on the edge of an artificial water reservoir. The pond and dike were built in 1978 using explosives so the mass has probably been lifted to the surface from a depth of about 2 m. In fall 2004, Kharitonov gave a small sample to A. Ye. Milanovsky who transferred it to the Vernadsky Institute (Moscow) and then proved its meteoritic origin.

== Pallasovka and Peter Pallas ==
The town of Pallasovka was named after Peter Pallas (1741–1811), a famous naturalist who took part in the discovery and the study of the first pallasite, a type of stony-iron meteorite named after him. Coincidentally, Pallasovka is a pallasite meteorite named after a town named after the discoverer of pallasites.

== Composition and classification ==
This pallasite consists of approximately equal parts of olivine and metal. Some olivine crystals reach a size of 3 centimetres (1.2 in). Its composition is similar to the Main Group pallasites, however it is called anomalous because chromites differ in composition both from that of the Main and Eagle Station pallasite groups.

== Specimens ==
The main mass has abundant rusty fusion crust with some regmaglypts and was held by an anonymous purchaser.

A 9336 g sample and one polished section are on deposit at Vernad.

== See also ==
- Glossary of meteoritics
