= Omolon (meteorite) =

Meteorite found in Russia

- Type: Stony-iron
- Class: Pallasite
- Composition: metal matrix: 89% Fe, 10.6% Ni; olivine Fa12.2
- Country: Russia
- Region: Magadan
- Coordinates: 64°1′12″N 161°48′30″E
- Observed fall: Yes
- Fall date: May 16, 1981, 5:10
- TKW: 250 kg

Omolon is a meteorite fallen in 1981 in the Omolon River basin, Magadan (Russia). It is a pallasite.

== History ==
On May 16, 1981 at 5:10 there was a report from a meteorological station of a bright fireball. A mass of 250 kilograms (550 lb) was found in 1983 by I. Tynavie, who had observed the fall on May 16, 1981. The meteorite was recovered in June 1990.

== Specimens ==
Main mass: North-East Complex Research Institute, Russian Academy of Sciences Far-East Division, Ul. Portovaya 16, Magadan 685000, Russia.

== See also ==
- Glossary of meteoritics
- Meteorite
