= Port Orford meteorite hoax =

1856 alleged meteorite fall

Port Orford meteorite
- Class: Pallasite
- Country: United States
- Region: Oregon
- Coordinates: 42°48′N 124°06′W
- Observed fall: No
- Found date: 1856 (claimed)
- TKW: 28 g 10–11 short tons (9,100–10,000 kg) (estimated, claimed)

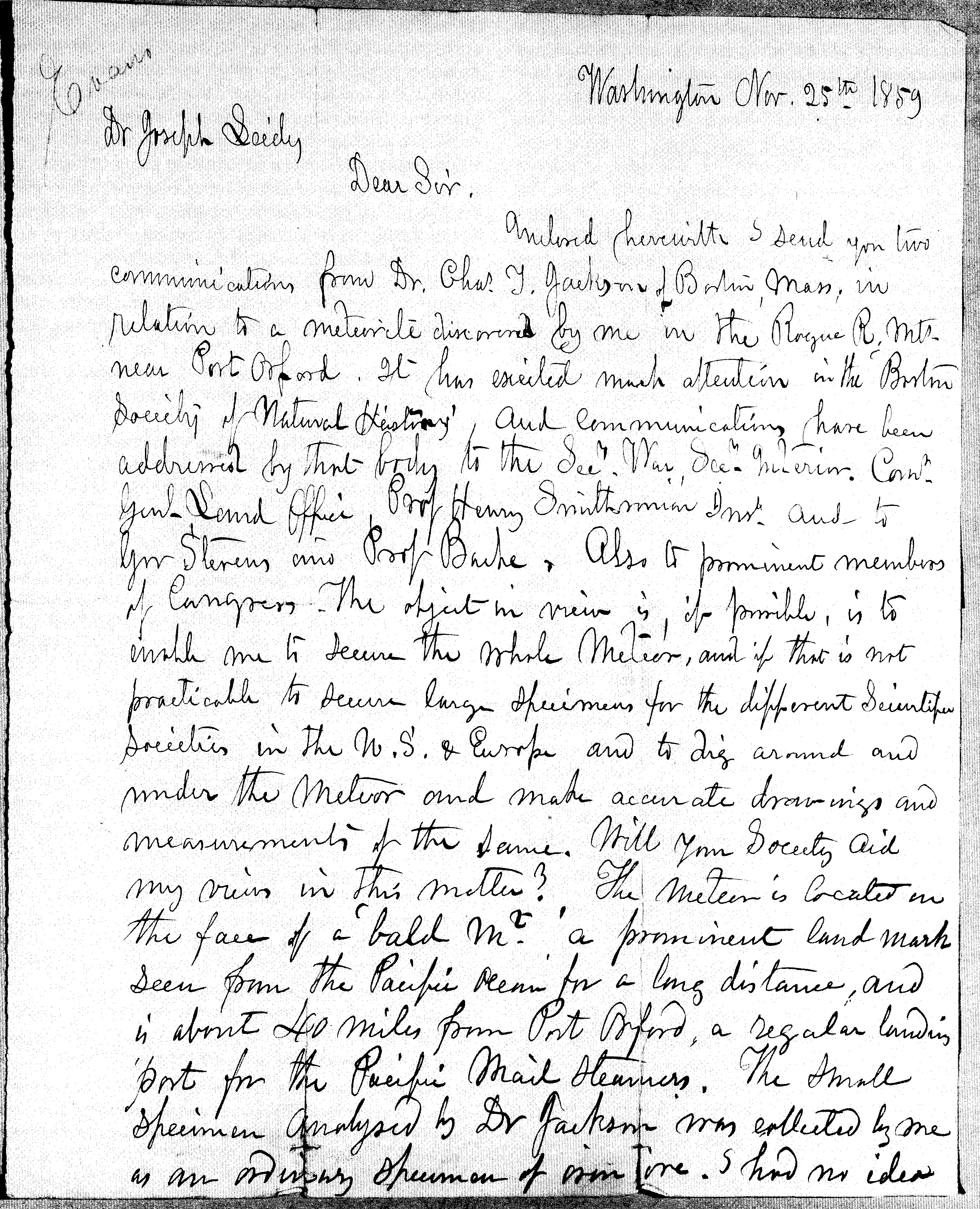
Letter from John Evans discussing a "meteor" discovered on Bald Mountain in Oregon, dated November 25, 1859

The Port Orford meteorite hoax concerns a 19th-century claimed meteorite discovery near Port Orford, Oregon in 1856. The meteorite has attracted the interest of meteorite hunters, with a value reported as high as $300 million.

== Claimed discovery ==
Dr. John Evans, a medical doctor and government-appointed geologist working for the United States Department of the Interior, claimed to have found a 10-ton (10,000 kg) pallasite meteorite in coastal Oregon (then Oregon Territory) on a "bald mountain" above Port Orford in 1856. Evans returned a sample to the East Coast, but he died of pneumonia in 1861 before the discovery could be corroborated.

== Hoax ==
It has been reported as a hoax, with modern metallurgical and other analysis showing that a 28 gram specimen collected by Evans was actually part of the Imilac Chilean meteorite of 1822 and probably acquired by him in Panama on his return to the United States East Coast. The mountain of Evans' claimed find has been tentatively identified as Johnson Mountain from Evans' reports and field notes; surveys of the area with sensitive proton magnetometers in the 1980s failed to show evidence of a nickel-rich meteorite there.
