= Roy Clark (disambiguation) =

Roy Clark (1933–2018) was an American country musician and television presenter.

Roy Clark or Clarke may also refer to:

- Roy Clark (police officer), head of Scotland Yard's anti-corruption squad
- Roy Clyde Clark (1920–2014), bishop of the United Methodist Church in the U.S.
- Roy Clark (baseball) (1874–1925), baseball player
- Roy Peter Clark (born 1948), American writer, editor and writing coach
- Roy Clarke (born 1930), British TV comedy writer
- Roy Clarke (footballer) (1925–2006), Welsh footballer
- Roy S. Clarke, American geochemist

== See also ==
- Roy Clark Senior Challenge, golf tournament
