= Haviland, Kansas =

City in Kiowa County, Kansas

- City
- Location within Kiowa County and Kansas

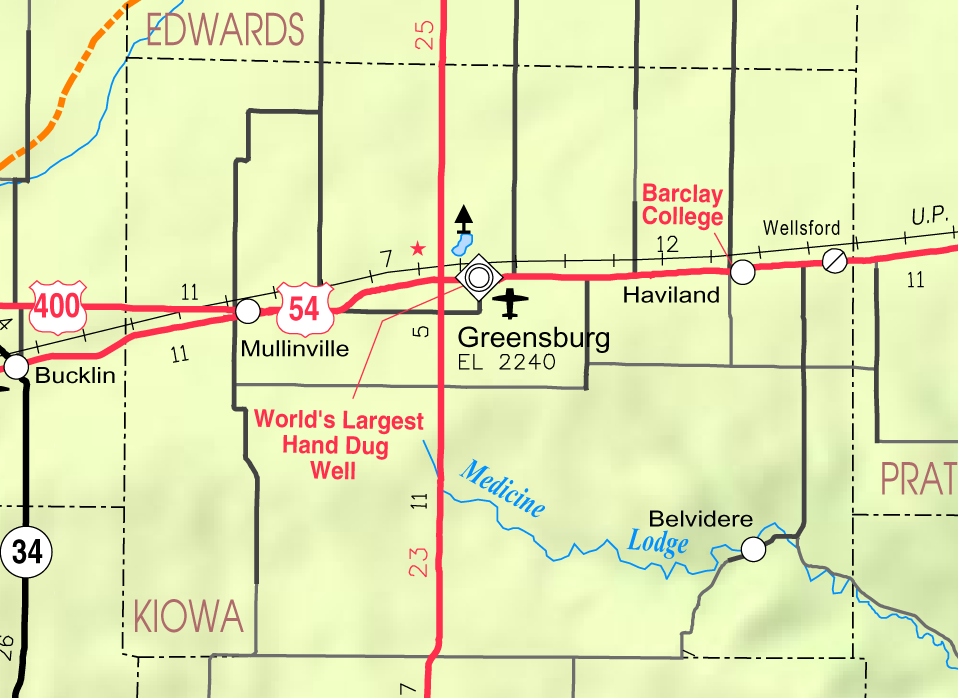
- KDOT map of Kiowa County (legend)
- Coordinates: 37°37′0″N 99°6′20″W
- Country: United States
- State: Kansas
- County: Kiowa
- Founded: 1880s
- Incorporated: 1906
- Named for: Laura Haviland

Government
  - Type: Mayor–Council

Area
  - Total: 0.49 sq mi (1.28 km^{2})
  - Land: 0.49 sq mi (1.28 km^{2})
  - Water: 0 sq mi (0.00 km^{2})
- Elevation: 2,152 ft (656 m)

Population (2020)
  - Total: 678
  - Density: 1,370/sq mi (530/km^{2})
- Time zone: UTC-6 (CST)
  - Summer (DST): UTC-5 (CDT)
- ZIP Code: 67059
- Area code: 620
- FIPS code: 20-30825
- GNIS ID: 474263
- Website: havilandks.gov

Haviland is a city in Kiowa County, Kansas, United States. As of the 2020 census, the population of the city was 678. It is located along Highway 54. It is home of Barclay College and known for meteorite finds connected to the Haviland Crater.

== History ==
Haviland was settled by a group of Quakers originally from Indiana and named for Laura Haviland, a leader of the Underground Railroad.

The first post office in Haviland was established in June 1886. Haviland was incorporated as a city in 1906.

== Geography ==
Haviland is located at 37°37′0″N 99°6′20″W (37.616685, -99.105478). According to the United States Census Bureau, the city has a total area of 0.45 square miles (1.17 km^{2}), all of it land.

== Demographics ==
Historical population
Census	Pop.	Note	%±
1910	568		—
1920	607		6.9%
1930	641		5.6%
1940	499		−22.2%
1950	606		21.4%
1960	725		19.6%
1970	705		−2.8%
1980	770		9.2%
1990	624		−19.0%
2000	612		−1.9%
2010	701		14.5%
2020	678		−3.3%
U.S. Decennial Census

=== 2020 census ===
The 2020 United States census counted 678 people, 227 households, and 147 families in Haviland. The population density was 1,378.0 per square mile (532.1/km^{2}). There were 260 housing units at an average density of 528.5 per square mile (204.0/km^{2}). The racial makeup was 86.14% (584) white or European American (84.51% non-Hispanic white), 3.39% (23) black or African-American, 0.29% (2) Native American or Alaska Native, 0.29% (2) Asian, 0.0% (0) Pacific Islander or Native Hawaiian, 3.54% (24) from other races, and 6.34% (43) from two or more races. Hispanic or Latino of any race was 6.19% (42) of the population.

Of the 227 households, 27.8% had children under the age of 18; 52.0% were married couples living together; 27.3% had a female householder with no spouse or partner present. 28.2% of households consisted of individuals and 13.7% had someone living alone who was 65 years of age or older. The average household size was 2.5 and the average family size was 3.1. The percent of those with a bachelor's degree or higher was estimated to be 21.1% of the population.

20.5% of the population was under the age of 18, 20.9% from 18 to 24, 19.2% from 25 to 44, 19.0% from 45 to 64, and 20.4% who were 65 years of age or older. The median age was 33.4 years. For every 100 females, there were 100.0 males. For every 100 females ages 18 and older, there were 101.9 males.

The 2016–2020 5-year American Community Survey estimates show that the median household income was $53,625 (with a margin of error of +/- $10,701) and the median family income was $59,375 (+/- $20,639). Males had a median income of $24,688 (+/- $9,444) versus $11,513 (+/- $6,173) for females. The median income for those above 16 years old was $16,688 (+/- $4,852). Approximately, 2.8% of families and 7.6% of the population were below the poverty line, including 7.5% of those under the age of 18 and 9.7% of those ages 65 or over.

=== 2010 census ===
As of the census of 2010, there were 701 people, 228 households, and 162 families residing in the city. The population density was 1,557.8 inhabitants per square mile (601.5/km^{2}). There were 261 housing units at an average density of 580.0 per square mile (223.9/km^{2}). The racial makeup of the city was 96.1% White, 1.1% African American, 1.7% Native American, 0.6% Asian, 0.1% Pacific Islander, 0.1% from other races, and 0.1% from two or more races. Hispanic or Latino of any race were 3.6% of the population.

There were 228 households, of which 28.1% had children under the age of 18 living with them, 62.7% were married couples living together, 7.5% had a female householder with no husband present, 0.9% had a male householder with no wife present, and 28.9% were non-families. 25.9% of all households were made up of individuals, and 12.2% had someone living alone who was 65 years of age or older. The average household size was 2.43 and the average family size was 2.93.

The median age in the city was 32.8 years. 19.4% of residents were under the age of 18; 21.9% were between the ages of 18 and 24; 20.3% were from 25 to 44; 22.5% were from 45 to 64; and 15.8% were 65 years of age or older. The gender makeup of the city was 46.9% male and 53.1% female.

== Education ==
=== Primary and secondary ===
The community is served by Haviland USD 474 public school district. It shares Kiowa County High School with Kiowa County USD 422 public school district.

Haviland High School was closed through school unification. The Haviland Dragons won the Kansas State High School boys Track & Field championship in 1922.

=== College ===
Barclay College, a four-year private college affiliated with the Religious Society of Friends, is located in Haviland.

== See also ==
- Barclay College
- Haviland Crater and Brenham (meteorite)
