= Pallasovka =

Pallasovka may refer to:

- Pallasovka (town), a town in Pallasovsky District of Volgograd Oblast, Russia
- Pallasovka Urban Settlement, a municipal formation which the town of Pallasovka in Pallasovsky District of Volgograd Oblast is incorporated as
- Pallasovka (meteorite), a pallasite meteorite
