= Mineo (meteorite) =

Meteorite found in Italy

- Type: Stony-iron
- Class: Pallasite
- Group: Main Group Pallasite
- Country: Italy
- Region: Sicily
- Coordinates: 37°17′N 14°42′E
- Observed fall: Yes
- Fall date: 3 May 1826
- TKW: 42 g

Mineo was one of the only four witnessed fall pallasite meteorites in the world, and the only one from Italy.

== History ==
On 3 May 1826 a bright meteor was observed over Sicily. Near the small town of Mineo (CT) was seen the fall of an object, followed by a loud sound. From the small crater was recovered a metallic mass.

== Specimens ==
Only 42g from this fall are still preserved in collections.

== See also ==
- Glossary of meteoritics
- Meteorite
