= Imilac =

Meteorite

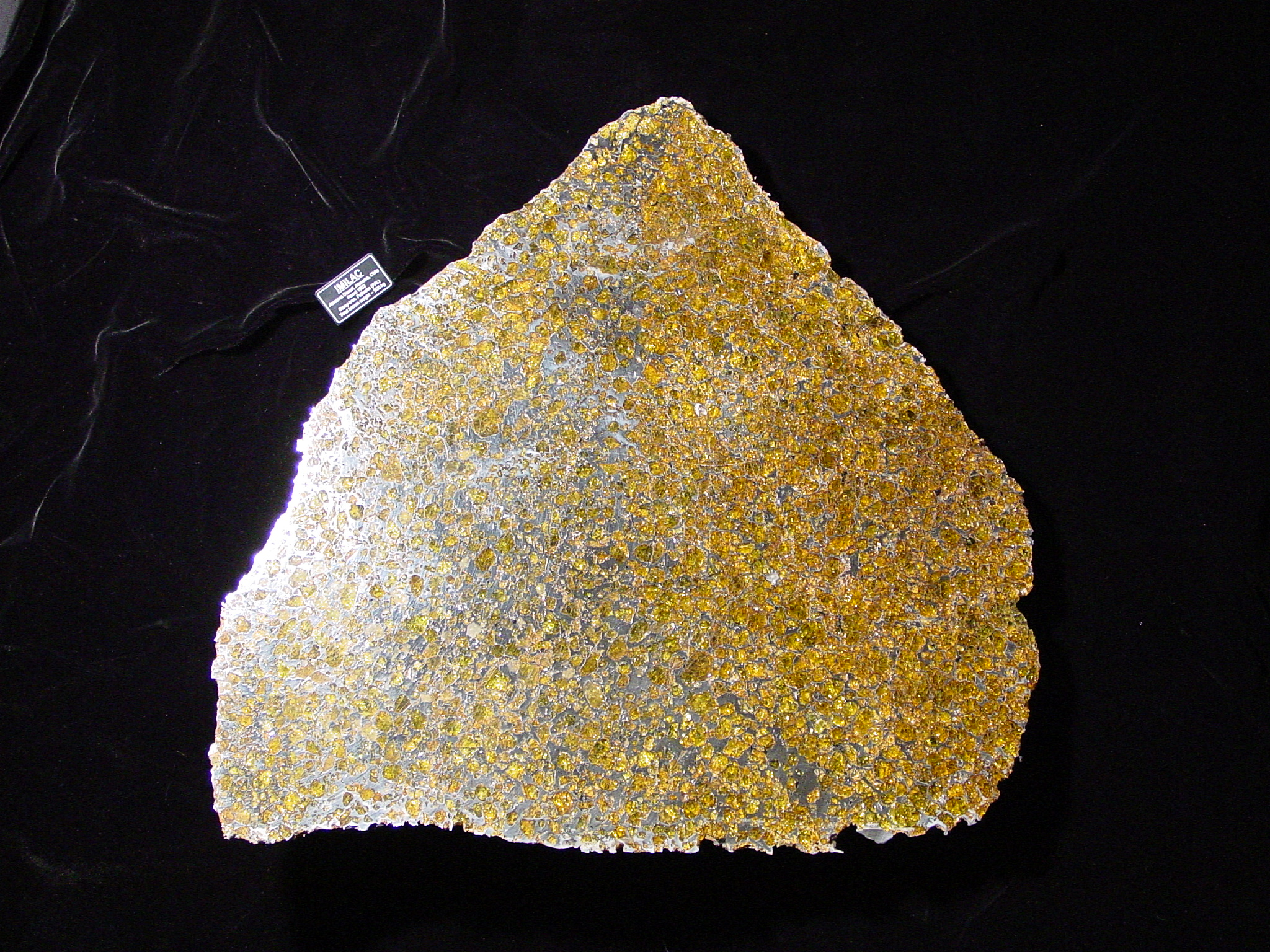
- 3747g full slice from the main mass
- Type: Stony–iron
- Class: Pallasite
- Group: Main Group Pallasite (MGP)
- Composition: 90% Fe, 9.9% Ni, 21.1 ppm Ga, 46.0 ppm Ge, 0.071 ppm Ir
- Country: Chile
- Region: Atacama Desert, Atacama Region
- Coordinates: 24°12′46″S 68°48′31″W
- Observed fall: No
- Found date: 1822
- TKW: 920 kg
- Strewn field: Yes
- Related media on Wikimedia Commons

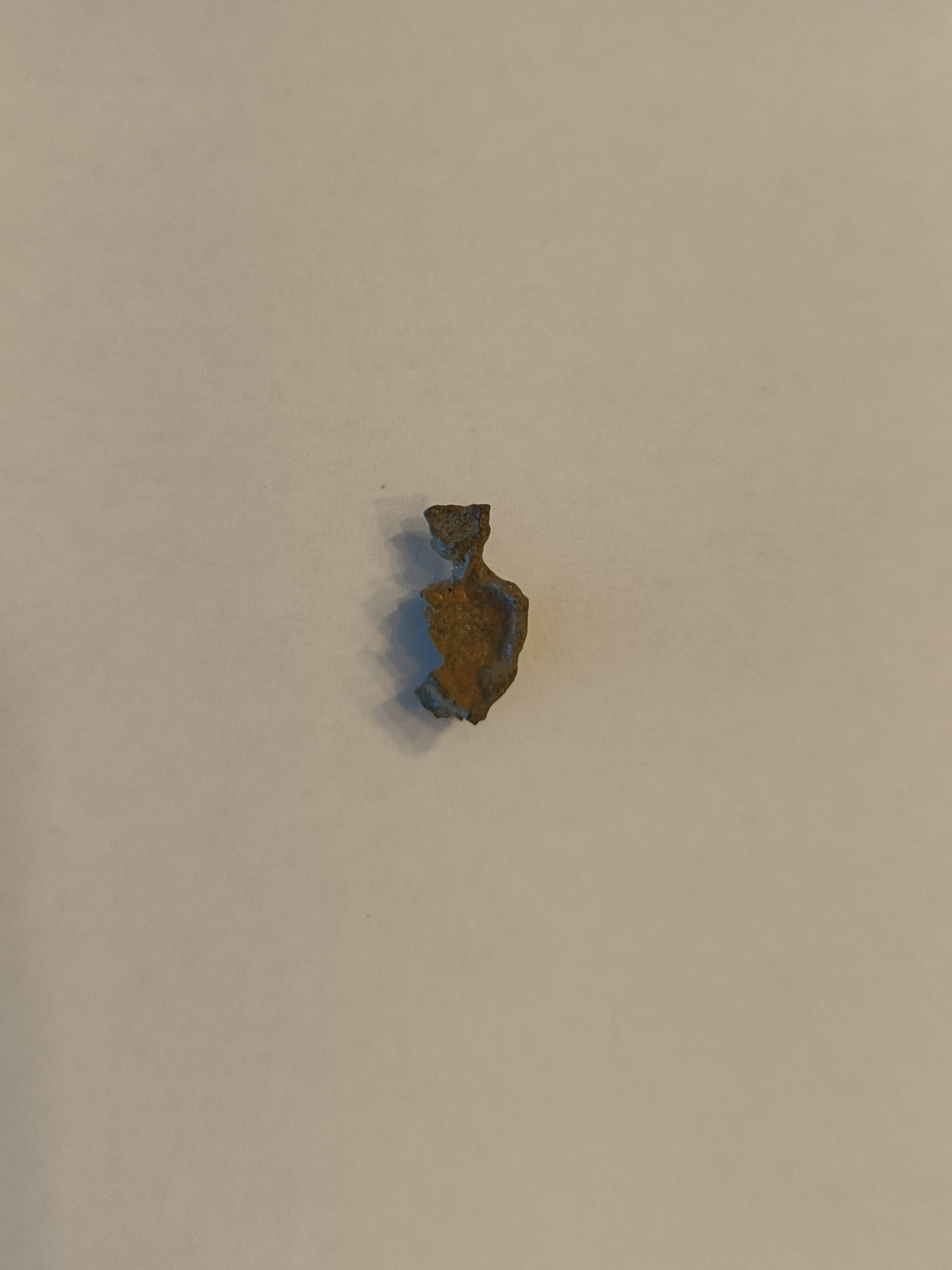
A "Metal Skeleton"

Imilac is a pallasite meteorite found in the Atacama Desert of Northern Chile in 1822.

== Classification ==
Imilac is classified as a stony–iron pallasite. Imilac specimens are highly prized by meteorite collectors due to its high concentration of beautiful olivine grains.

== Strewn field ==
Numerous masses were found in a valley to the southwest of Imilac. The total weight of the Imilac fall is estimated to be around 1,000 kilograms (2,200 lb). The primary strewn field is about 8 kilometres (5.0 mi) long.

== Specimens ==
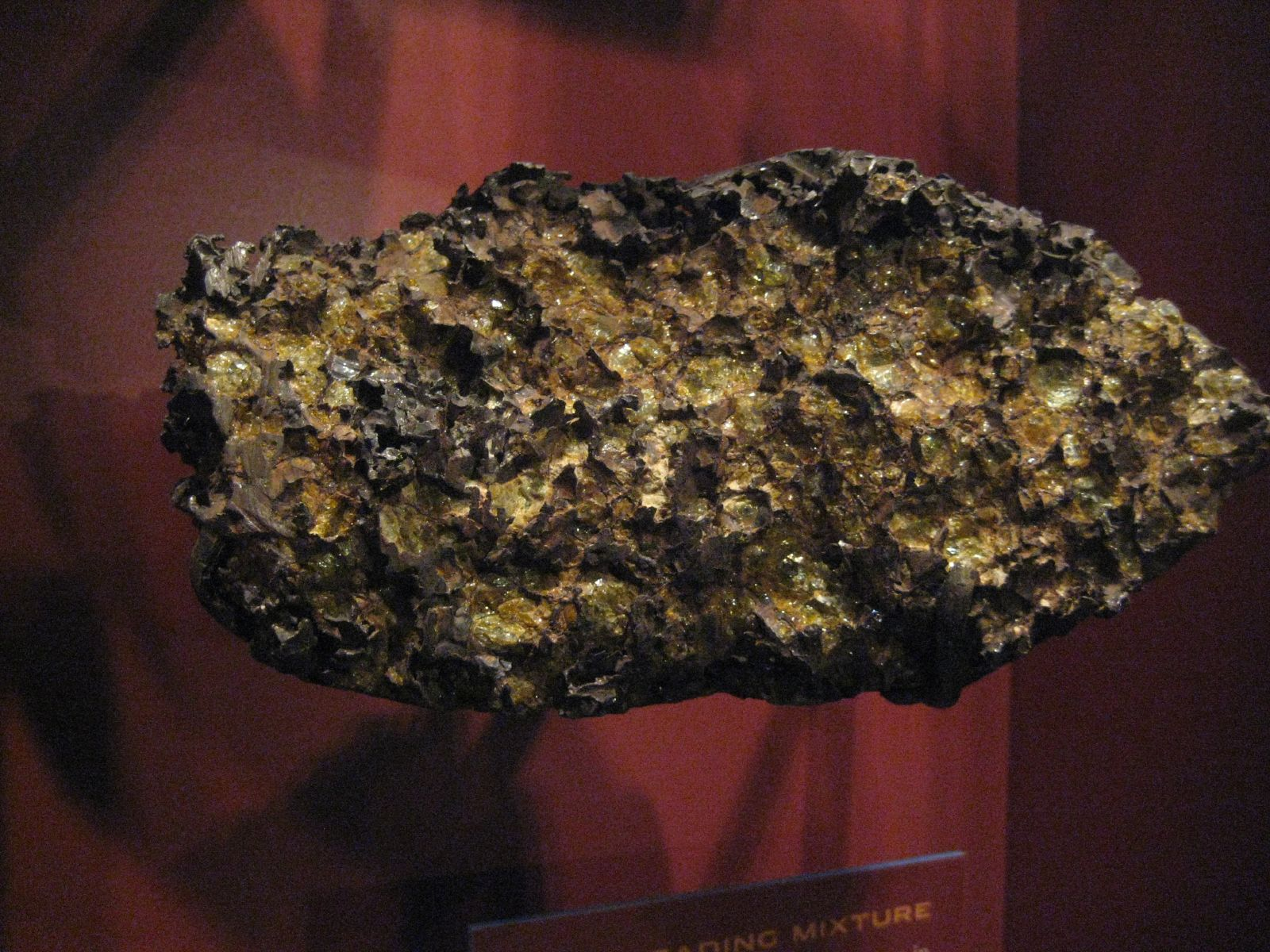
Individual

Due to weathering, intact olivine grains are present only on large specimens (over 1 kilogram (2.2 lb)). Smaller samples contain darker altered olivine crystals. On the market there are also a lot of very small (few grams) Imilac individuals called metal skeletons: they are severely weathered and lack olivine grains.

== See also ==
- Glossary of meteoritics
- Media related to Imilac at Wikimedia Commons
