= Big Well (Kansas) =

- Greensburg Well
- U.S. National Register of Historic Places
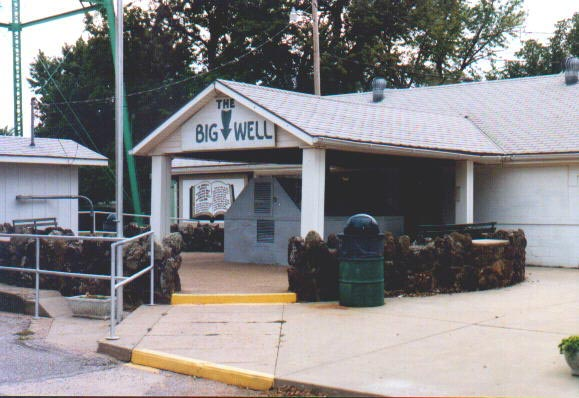
- Former Big Well visitor center before it was destroyed by a tornado in 2007

- Location within Kansas Location within the United States
- Location: 315 South Sycamore, Greensburg, Kansas
- Coordinates: 37°36′20″N 99°17′37″W
- Area: 1 acre (0.40 ha)
- Built: 1887
- Architect: Wheeler, J.W.
- NRHP reference No.: 72000507
- Added to NRHP: February 23, 1972

The Big Well is a large historic water well in Greensburg, Kansas, United States. Visitors enter the well for a fee, descending an illuminated stairway to the bottom of the well.

== History ==
It began construction in 1887 at a cost of $45,000 to provide water for the Santa Fe and Rock Island railroads and finished construction in 1888. It served as the municipal water supply until 1932. It was designated a National Museum in 1972; in 1973 it was awarded an American Water Landmark by the American Water Works Association. Under the name of "Greensburg Well", it has been listed on the National Register of Historic Places (NRHP) since 1972. In 2008, the well was named one of the 8 Wonders of Kansas.

== Construction ==
The Big Well's construction in 1887 utilized many engineering techniques from the late 19th century. According to The Kansas Sampler Foundation, crews of 12-15 men utilized pickaxes, shovels, ropes, pulleys, and barrels. The casing of the well was made from stones brought from the Medicine River roughly twelve miles south of Greensburg that were brought over via wagons. Slatted wagons were used to haul dirt away from the well. Whenever a low spot was reached in the wagon, the slats were opened, allowing level ground to be created around the area. As the well's construction continued, a wide shaft was cribbed and braced every twelve feet with two by twelve inch planks for safety reasons in concern of the workers. Utilizing these braces, soil was hoisted up in barrels to continue the digging. After the stones were fitted around them, the braces were sawed off. When the well had reached roughly 109 feet in depth, perforated pipe was driven horizontally into gravel containing water, which aided in bringing water into the basin.

== Visitor center ==
The well had a visitor center detailing the history of the well's construction. On May 4, 2007, a tornado hit Greensburg, destroying the center. The well reopened on May 26, 2012.

The new visitor center, also known as the Big Well Museum, contains a circular timeline of the city of Greensburg in three stages, including the beginnings of Greensburg, the Tornadic event, and the Eco-Friendly Rebuilding of Greensburg. The Big Well Museum contains information on the formation of tornadoes and explains the meteorological phenomenon that took place to spawn such an event. There are interactive pull-outs in the walls, as well as televisions, cards, and infographics depicting historical events, interviews, tragedies, model survival kits, and other tornado related items. Around the museum are elements of storm debris, including stop signs, street signs, clocks, and tornado sirens, including the remains of Greensburg's Federal Signal Thunderbolt siren destroyed by the tornado. A Sentry 10v was installed during the rebuilding to replace it.

The visitor center also displayed a Brenham half-ton (1,000 lb, 450 kg) pallasite meteorite recovered from the area. The meteorite was billed as the world's largest single-piece pallasite, but that title is held by other samples. It was reported that the Big Well visitor center was destroyed, and the meteorite was missing on May 7. The meteorite, which was insured for $1 million, was later located underneath a collapsed wall and was displayed temporarily at the Sternberg Museum of Natural History in Hays, Kansas while the new building was being built. It has returned to the reconstructed museum site.

== Gallery ==
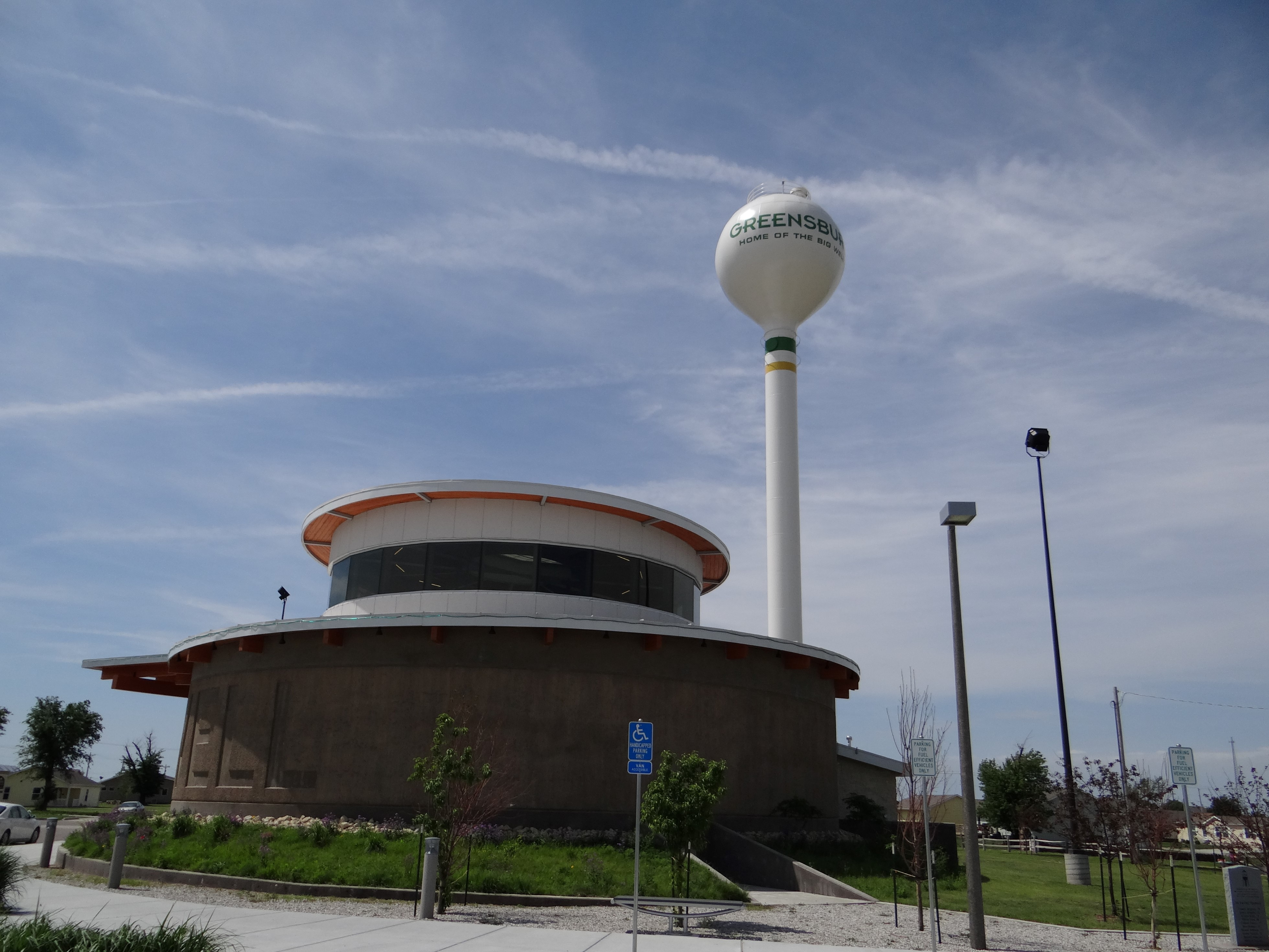
New Big Well Museum, as of June 2013.

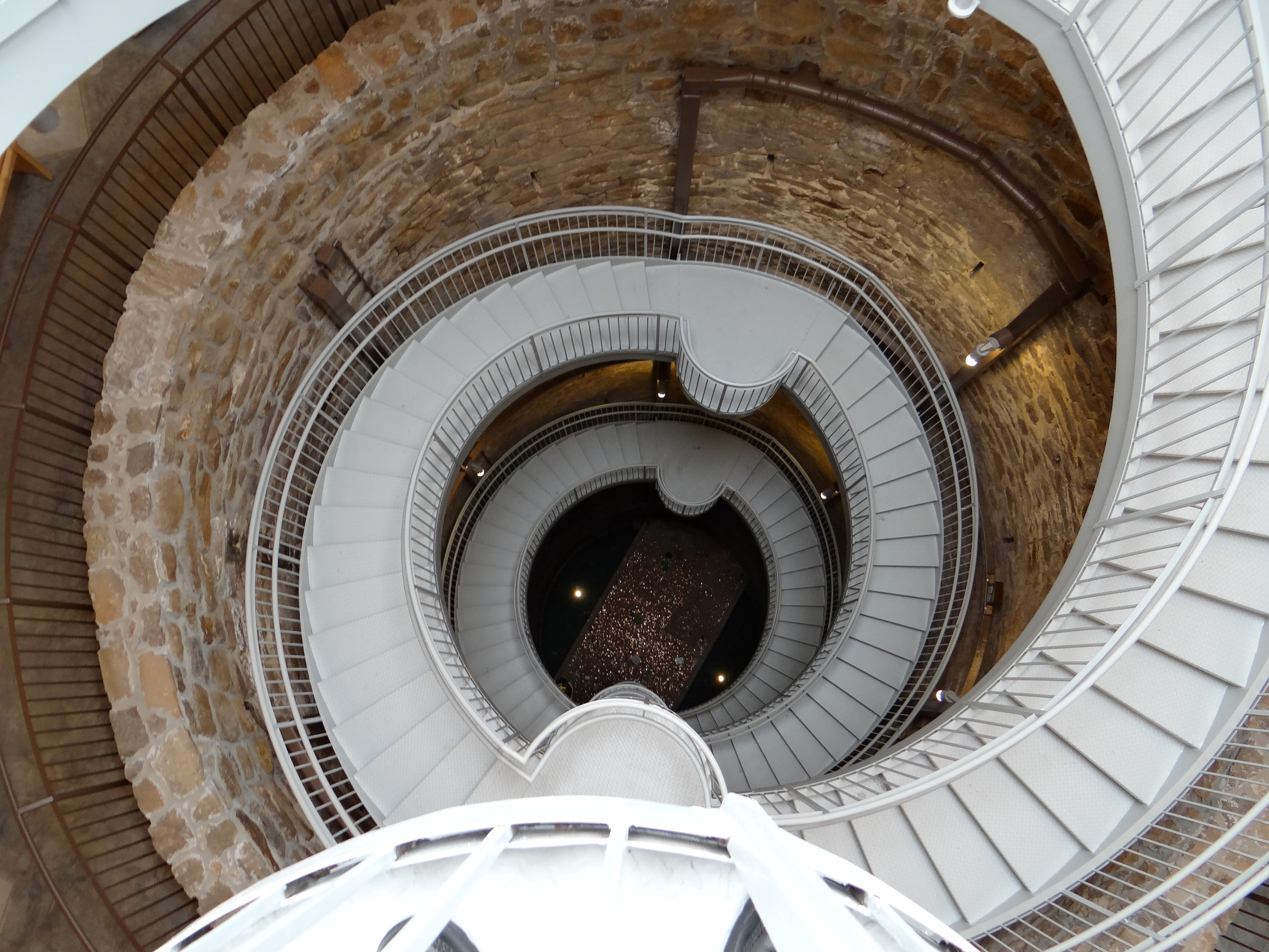
The new museum's well stairwell, as of June 2013.

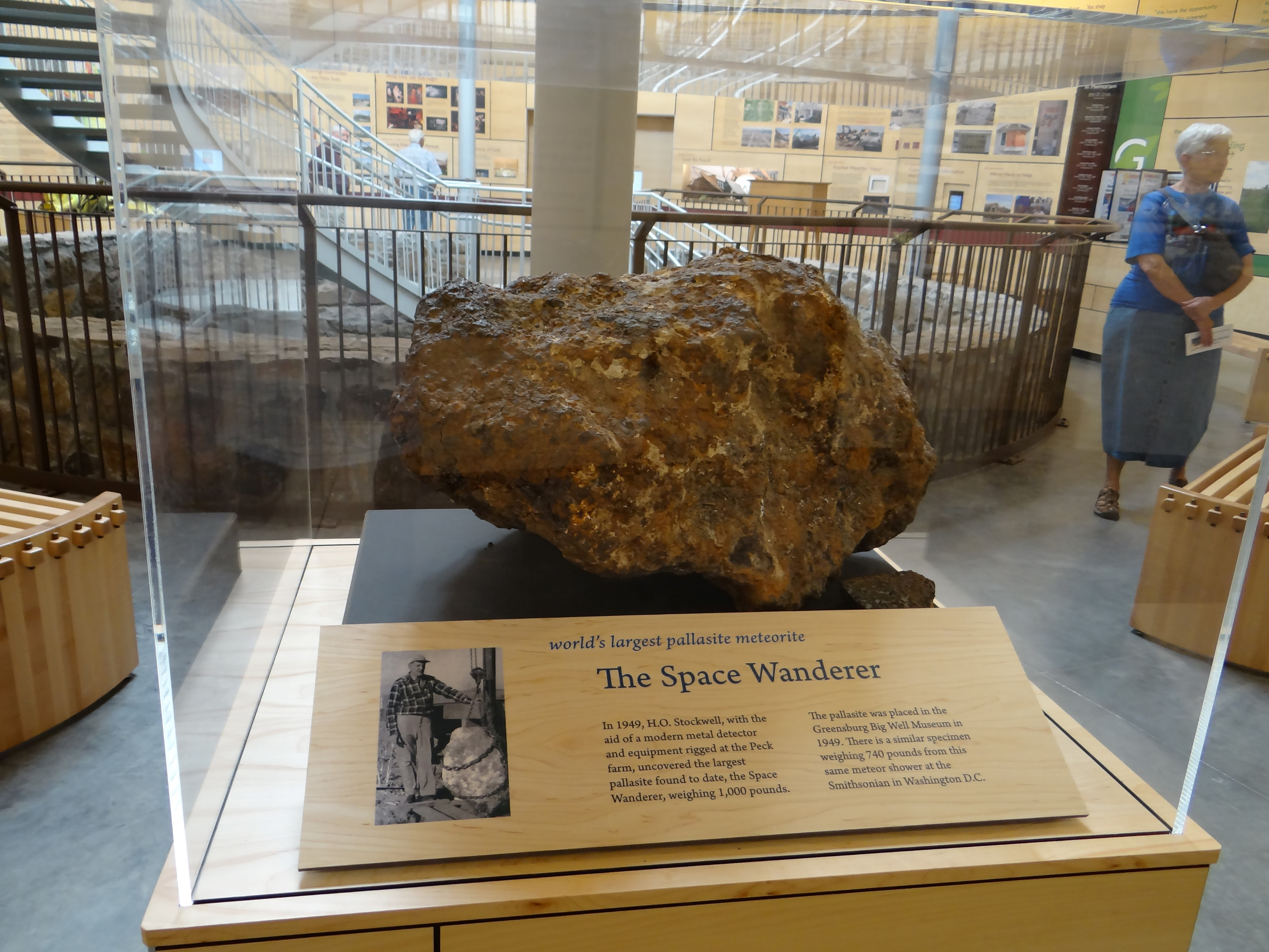
"World's Largest Pallasite Meteorite"

== See also ==
- Pallasite meteorite, displayed at Big Well museum
- Woodingdean Water Well, world's deepest hand-dug water well
