= Haviland Crater =

Impact crater in Kansas

Coordinates: 37°35′N 99°10′W

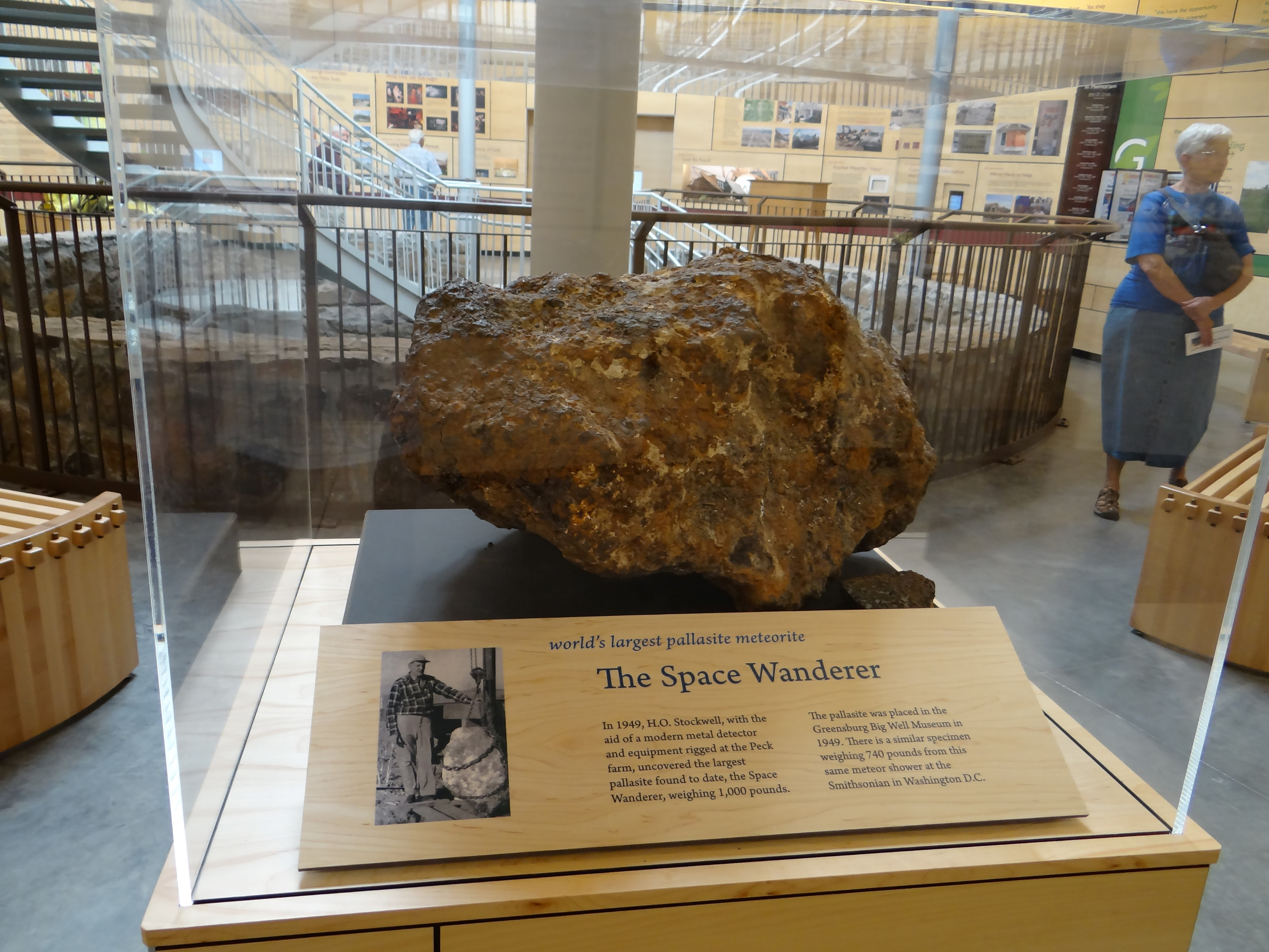
- Pallasite Meteorite at Big Well museum in Greensburg, Kansas

- Location within the United States Location within Kansas
- Location: Kansas, USA

Impact crater structure
- Confidence: Confirmed
- Diameter: 50 feet (15 m)
- Age: < 0.001
- Exposed: Yes
- Drilled: No
- Bolide type: Pallasite

The Haviland Crater, also called the Brenham Crater, is a meteorite crater (astrobleme) in Kiowa County, Kansas.

The oval crater is 50 feet (15 m) in diameter, making it one of the smallest impact craters in the world. Its age is estimated to be less than 1,000 years. It has been explored with ground-penetrating radar.

== Meteorite ==
Over 15,000 pounds (7,000 kg) of pallasite meteorites have been recovered from the Brenham fall.
