= Roy S. Clarke =

American scientist focusing on geochemistry

Roy S. Clarke was an American scientist focusing on geochemistry.

== Biography ==
Clark got his education in Cornell University, where he got his bachelor's degree in 1949. In 1957 he got his master's degree in geochemistry at George Washington University. He became a member of Smithsonian Institution in 1957. Starting from 1966, he was an associate curator in the department of mineral sciences, a division of National Museum of Natural History, and in 1970, got a position as curator at the same place. Later in life, he got a position of curator emeritus at the NMNH. He was famous for his chemical analysis of meteorites and minerals. He worked as research chemist emeritus in the division of meteorites at the museum until his death in 2016, aged 91.

== Works ==
Books written:

- Meteorites and the Smithsonian

Books edited:

- Volume about the Port Orford meteorite hoax
