= Barclay College =

College in Kansas

- Type: Private college
- Established: 1917
- Affiliations: ACSI
- Religious affiliation: Quakers
- Endowment: $812,000 (2007)
- President: Derek Brown
- Academic staff: 30
- Students: 210
- Location: Haviland, Kansas, United States; 37°37′17″N 99°06′18″W
- Campus: Rural, 20 acres (8.1 ha)
- Colors: Crimson and Gray
- Sporting affiliations: ACCA – Midwest Christian College Conference
- Mascot: Bear
- Website: barclaycollege.edu

Barclay College is a private Quaker college in Haviland, Kansas. It is known for ministry degrees but offers degrees in other professional fields. Since the fall of 2007, the college has offered full-tuition scholarships to students who enroll full-time and pay to live in the residence halls.

== History ==
In 1917, evangelist and teacher Scott T. Clark founded the Kansas Central Bible Training School on the site of Haviland Friends Academy, a Quaker high school in Haviland, Kansas. A two-year junior college course was added in 1925, and the name was changed in 1930 to Friends Bible College to more fully reflect the growing mission of the institution.

By 1968, the school's vision put an emphasis on the four-year institution, leading to closure of the high school program and an effort to secure necessary faculty and facilities. This effort received general recognition in 1975 with the granting of full accreditation by the Association for Biblical Higher Education. Barclay College adopted its current name in 1990 to honor the first Quaker theologian, Robert Barclay.

== Campus ==
The campus in Haviland covers 13 acres (5 hectares) and contains eight primary buildings:

Current Buildings and Facilities include:

- Phillips Hall (1947), home to administrative offices;
- Worden Memorial Library (built c. 1978/1979); in addition to housing the library, this facility houses faculty offices, and the largest Friends collection of books among any Friends Schools;
- Hockett Auditorium (c. 1958), the school's gymnasium;
- Broadhurst Student Center (1968), including the dining facilities, student lounge, bookstore, and popular Bear's Den restaurant;
- Jackson Hall (c. 1992/1993), an academic classroom building, with a science lab;
- Lewis Hall (2010), a men's residence hall.
- Coppock Hall (1962), a men's residence hall;
- Lemmon's Hall (2000), a women's residence hall;
- Binford House (acquired 2010), a women's residence;
- Ross-Ellis Center For Arts And Ministry (2017), the newest addition to the campus, including an auditorium, chapel facility, classrooms, music practice rooms, and choir hall;
- Maintenance Shop (c. 2000s), provides space for facilities, maintenance, grounds, housekeeping, and a weight room for students use.
- "Old" Maintenance Shop (1947), currently used for storage, originally first on-campus men's residence, the building was purchased in 1947 from a U.S. Army Air Corps Base, where it served as barracks.

Previous Buildings: The Academy Building (c. 1897 - ?); Founder's Hall (1917–2000), served as the original gym, classroom, and administration building, as well as the library, and music hall; West Hall (acquired c. 1955 - c. 2004), used for classroom, ceramic, and other uses. Auxiliary House (? - 2010); used originally to house students, later used for Admissions, then used by the College's Auxiliary;

== Students and faculty ==
In the 2006-2007 school year, Barclay College had 89 students. The class demographics were 95% white, 3% Hispanic, 1% African American, and 1% Asian American or Pacific Islander. There were 19 faculty members, 39% of them full-time, making for an 8:1 student-to-teacher ratio.

The fall of 2008 saw an increase in student body with 125 students. More recently, in the fall of 2009 the school year started with 167 students. In 2012 over 200 students were on campus, and online, extension sites, and graduate studies brought the total headcount up to 292. (Board of Trustees Report May 2013)
