= Pallasite =

Class of stony-iron meteorite

Pallasites
- — Class —
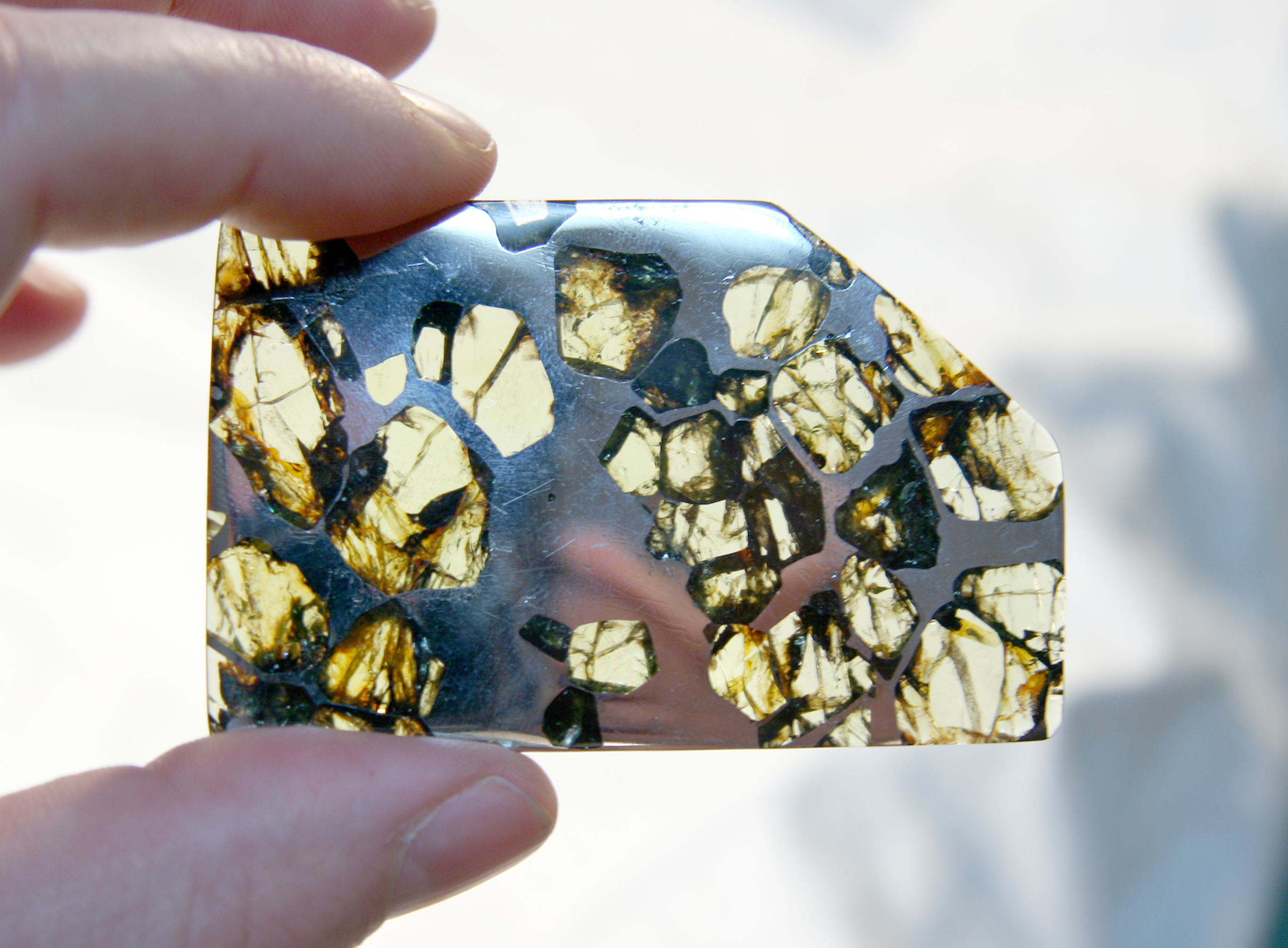
- A slice of the Esquel pallasite, clearly showing the large olivine crystals suspended in the metal matrix.
- Type: Stony-iron
- Subgroups: Main group pallasites; Eagle Station group; Pyroxene pallasite grouplet; Ungrouped pallasites
- Composition: Meteoric iron, Silicates
- Total known specimens: 49 Main group, 5 Eagle Station, 2 Pyroxene grouplet, 38 ungrouped (93 total)

The pallasites are a class of stony-iron meteorite. They are relatively rare, and can be distinguished by the presence of large olivine crystal inclusions in the ferro-nickel matrix.

These crystals represent mantle and core material from differentiated planetesimals, which were destroyed by violent collisions during the early formation of the Solar System.

== Structure and composition ==
It consists of centimetre-sized olivine crystals of peridot quality in an iron-nickel matrix. Coarser metal areas develop Widmanstätten patterns upon etching. Minor constituents are schreibersite, troilite, chromite, pyroxenes, and phosphates (whitlockite, stanfieldite, farringtonite, and merrillite).

== Classification and subgroups ==
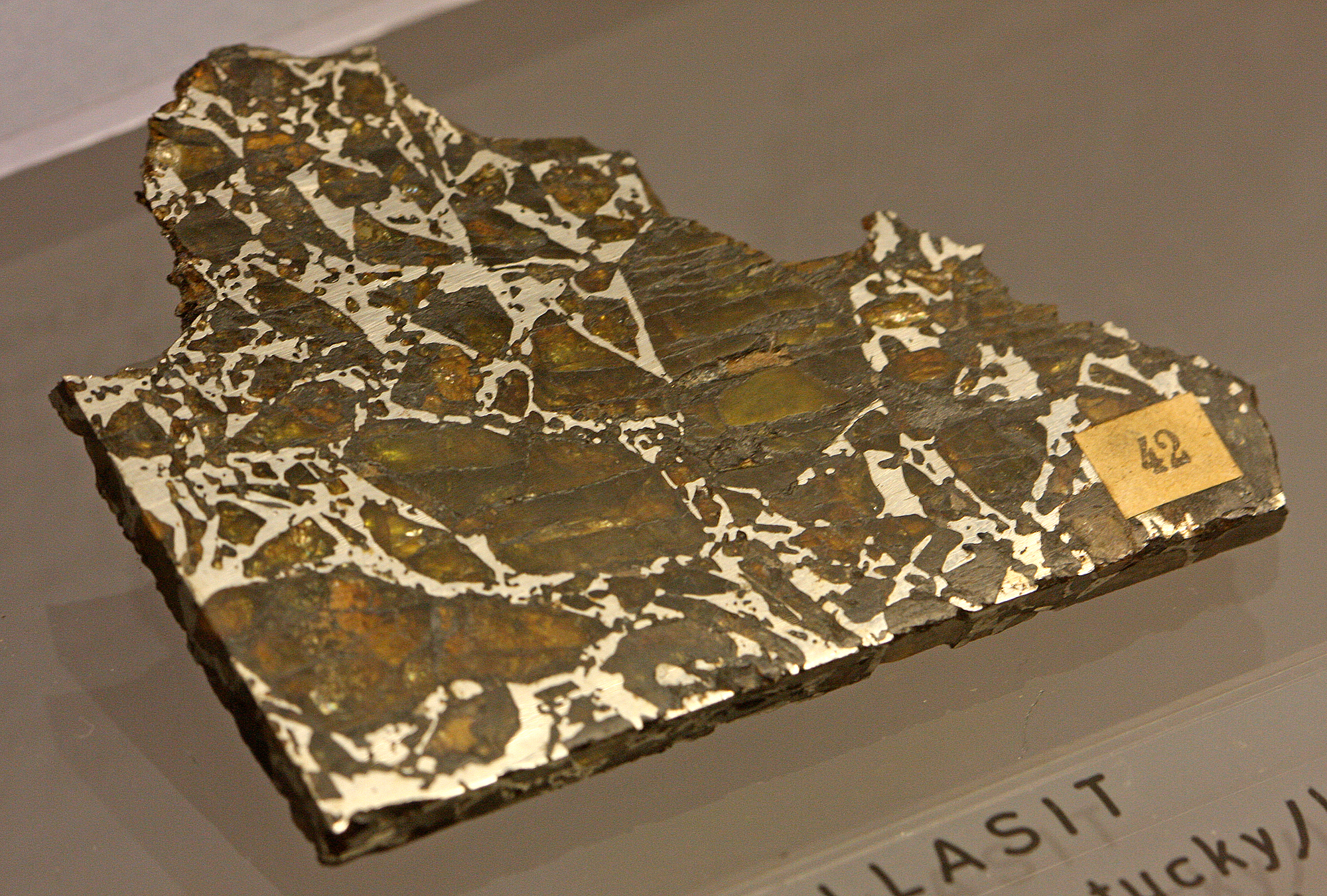
Eagle Station, ES group

Using the oxygen isotopic composition, meteoric iron composition and silicate composition pallasites are divided into 4 subgroups:

- Main group pallasites (PMG): Almost all pallasites.
- Eagle Station group (PES): 5 specimens known. They are related to IIF irons.
- Pyroxene Pallasite grouplet (PPX): Counts only Vermillion and Yamato 8451. They take their name from the high orthopyroxene content (about 5%). Metal matrix shows a fine octahedrite Widmanstätten pattern.
- Pallasite ungrouped (P-ung): Specimens that do not fit into any groups or grouplets.

== Origin ==
Pallasites were once thought to originate at the core-mantle boundary of differentiated asteroids that were subsequently shattered through impacts. A recent alternative hypothesis is that they are impact-generated mixtures of core and mantle materials. This hypothesis is supported by isotopic analysis indicating admixture of material from multiple planetesimals.

== History ==
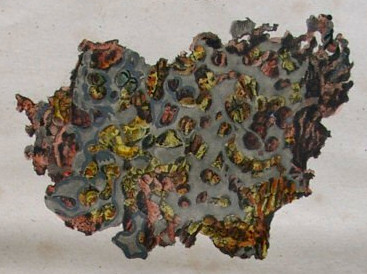
Krasnojarsk meteorite

A common error is to associate their name with the asteroid 2 Pallas; however, they are actually named after the German naturalist Peter Pallas (1741–1811), who studied in 1772 a specimen found earlier near Krasnoyarsk in the mountains of Siberia that had a mass of 680 kilograms (1,500 lb). (Note: Peter Pallas' account of the meteorite near Krasnoyarsk appears in: Pallas, P.S. (1778). Reise durch verschiedene Provinzen des russischen Reichs in einem ausführlichen Auszuge, dritte Teil [Journey through various provinces of the Russian Empire, in an extensive excerpt, 3rd part] (in German). Frankfurt and Leipzig, (Germany): Johann Georg Fleischer. pp. 315–325.; During his journey through Russia, in the vicinity of Krasnoyarsk, Pallas learned of a huge meteorite. From p. 315: "Die vorzüglichste Merkwürdigkeit aus dem Mineralreiche, welche ich in der Krasnojarkische Gegend ausfindig gemacht habe, ist einen ungeheure fast vierzig Pud oder 1600 Pfund schwere Masse von drusigt gewachsenem gediegnen Eisen, worüber etwas umständlicher geredet werden muß." (The most outstanding oddity in the mineral realm, which I located in the vicinity of Krasnoyarsk, is a huge, almost 40 pood or 1600 funt [i.e., 655 kg / 1444 pound] mass of native iron [that had] become pitted by weathering, about which something must be said at some length.) Pallas was informed about the meteorite by the chief foreman of a local mine, Johann Casper Mettich, who had been directed to the meteor by Jacob Medvedef of Ubeiskaya, a local blacksmith and former Cossack. Mettich had been sent to find the meteor in order to obtain a sample and thus determine whether it contained any precious metals. Mettich described its appearance. From p. 317: " … einen scheinbarlich über dreysig Pud schweren Eisen-Kriz, welcher voll gelber sproder Steinchen, von der Grösse einer Zeder-Nuß saß, die man nicht ganz herausklopfen konnte. Dieses und der Klang des Krizes kam mir merkwürdig vor." ( … a block [i.e., bloom ] of iron obviously [weighing] over 30 pood, which was full of brittle, yellow, little stones, the size of pine nuts, which couldn't be knocked out whole. This and the ringing tone [that the meteorite made when it was struck] seemed strange to me.) Mettich said that Medvedef later removed the meteor to an unknown location. On p. 318, Medvedef said of the meteorite: "Weil die besondre Schmeidigkeit und Weisse des Eisens in der Masse, und deren klingender Ton ihn argwöhnisch machte, daß es wohl etwas edleres als Eisen seyn könnte, auch die Tartaren, welche diese Eisenwake als ein vom Himmel gefallenes Heiligthum betracteten, ihn in dieser Meynung bestärkten, … " (Because of the especial malleability and whiteness of the iron, and [because] of the ringing tone [that it made when struck], [it] made him suspicious that it could perhaps be somewhat more noble than iron [i.e., might contain precious metals]; also the Tartars, who regarded this iron boulder as a sacred relic [which had] fallen from the sky, strengthened him in this opinion, … ) Medvedef said that he had moved the stone to his village of Malayaderevna or Medvedeva, outside Ubeiskaya. Pallas said (p. 318) that in the mail of November 1771, he had received a piece of the meteorite from a Tartar soldier, who had found the meteorite on Medvedef's farm and had (with some difficulty) chiseled some samples off the meteorite. Pallas immediately had the soldier haul the meteorite 220 versts (i.e., 235 km / 146 miles) into the city of Krasnoyarsk. Pallas then (pp. 319–321) described the meteorite in detail. "Die ganze Wake scheint eine rohe eisenteinartige Schwarte gehabt zu haben, die auf einem gross Theil der Oberfläche durch die Hammerschläge, womit man Stücken davon abzusondern gesucht hat, verloren gegangen ist. Ausser dieser ziemlich dünnen Rinde ist das ganze innere Wesen derselben ein geschmeidiges weißbrüchiges, wie ein grober Seeschwam löcherigt ausgewebtes Eisen, dessen Zwischenräume mit runden und länglichten Tropfen eines sehr spröden aber harten Bernsteingelben vollkommen hellen und reinen Glases oder Hyacinthenflusses genau ausgefüllt sind. Diese Tropfen haben verschiedne länglich runde Gestalten und eine sehr glatte Oberfläche, die mehrentheils eine, zwey, auch wohl drey ganz platte Seiten an dem stumpfen Theil ihres sonst abgerundeten und mit andern Tropfen oft zusammenfliessenden Cörpers zeigen. Diese Textur und diese Flußtropfen, welche die Grösse vom Hanfkorn bis zur grossen Erbse oder drüber und bald eine reine gelbe, bald eine gelb-braune oder auf grünlich spielende Farbe haben, zeigen sich durch die ganze Masse einförming und ohne alle Spur von Schlacken oder künstlichem Feuer. Das Eisen ist so zähe daß drey bis vier Schmiede oft ganze Vormittage gearbeitet haben, um mit stählernen Keilen und Schmiedehämmern eine oder die andre Ecke von der Masse abzustuffen, die doch gemeiniglich nur zu einigen Pfunden gewonnen werden konnten, … " (The whole boulder seems to have had a rough skin like iron ore, which, on a large part of the surface, had gone missing as a result of hammer blows with which one sought to detach pieces from it. Besides this rather thin rind, the whole internal character of it is a malleable, brittle, white, lacy iron, holey like a coarse sea sponge, whose interstices are quite filled with round and oblong drops of a very brittle but hard amber-yellow, completely clear and pure glass or "hyacinth flux" [i.e., a yellow-green form of fluorite]. These drops have various elongated forms and a very smooth surface, which to a large extent show one, two, and even three quite flat sides at the blunt part of their otherwise rounded bodies, which often coalesce with other drops. This texture and these drops of flux [or: fluorite], which [vary in] size from hemp seeds to large peas or larger and have now a pure yellow, now a yellow-brown or green-flecked color, appear uniform throughout the whole mass and without any trace of slag or man-made fire. The iron is so tough that 3–4 smiths often worked whole mornings in order to break off one or another corner of the mass with steel wedges and blacksmith's hammers, [but] could generally obtain only a few pounds [of sample material from the meteorite], … ) The German-Russian scientist Friedemann Adolph Goebel (1826–1895) reviewed Pallas' account, adding some details to it: Goebel, Friedemann Adolph (1875). "Über die neuerdings gegen den kosmischen Ursprung des Pallas-Eisens erhobenen Zweifel, nebst einer Widerlegung derselben" [On the recently raised doubts about the cosmic origin of the Pallas iron [meteorite], together with a refutation of them]. Bulletin de l'Académie Impériale des Sciences de St.-Pétersbourg (in German and French). 20: 100–130.; English translations of some relevant passages from Pallas' Reise appear in: Pedersen, Holger (2017). Pallas Iron: Russia's first meteorite. Copenhagen, Denmark: Books on Demand. pp. 19–21. ISBN 9788771702132.) The Krasnoyarsk mass described by Pallas in 1776 was one of the examples used by Ernst Chladni in the 1790s to demonstrate the reality of meteorite falls on the Earth, which most scientists at his time considered as fairytales. This rock mass was dissimilar to all rocks or ores found in this area (and the large piece could not have been accidentally transported to the find site), but its content of native metal was similar to other finds known from completely different areas.

== Pallasite falls ==
Pallasites are a rare type of meteorite. Only 61 are known to date, including 10 from Antarctica, with four being observed falls. The following four falls are in chronological order:

- Mineo, Sicily, Italy. A luminous meteor was observed and an object seen to fall with a loud roar in May 1826. Only 46 grams (1.6 oz) are preserved in collections.
- Zaisho, Japan. 330 g were found on February 1, 1898, after the appearance of a fireball.
- Marjalahti, Karelia, Russia. After the appearance of a bright meteor and detonations, a large mass was seen to fall, and 45 kilograms (99 lb) were recovered in June 1902. At this date the fall site belonged to Finland, and the main mass of Marjalahti is now at the Geological Museum of the University of Helsinki.
- Omolon, Magadan Region, Russia. A reindeer-breeder observed the fall on 16 May 1981, and found the 250-kilogram (550 lb) meteorite two years later. The fall was confirmed by a meteorological station that had observed a fireball on the same date.

== Notable pallasite finds ==
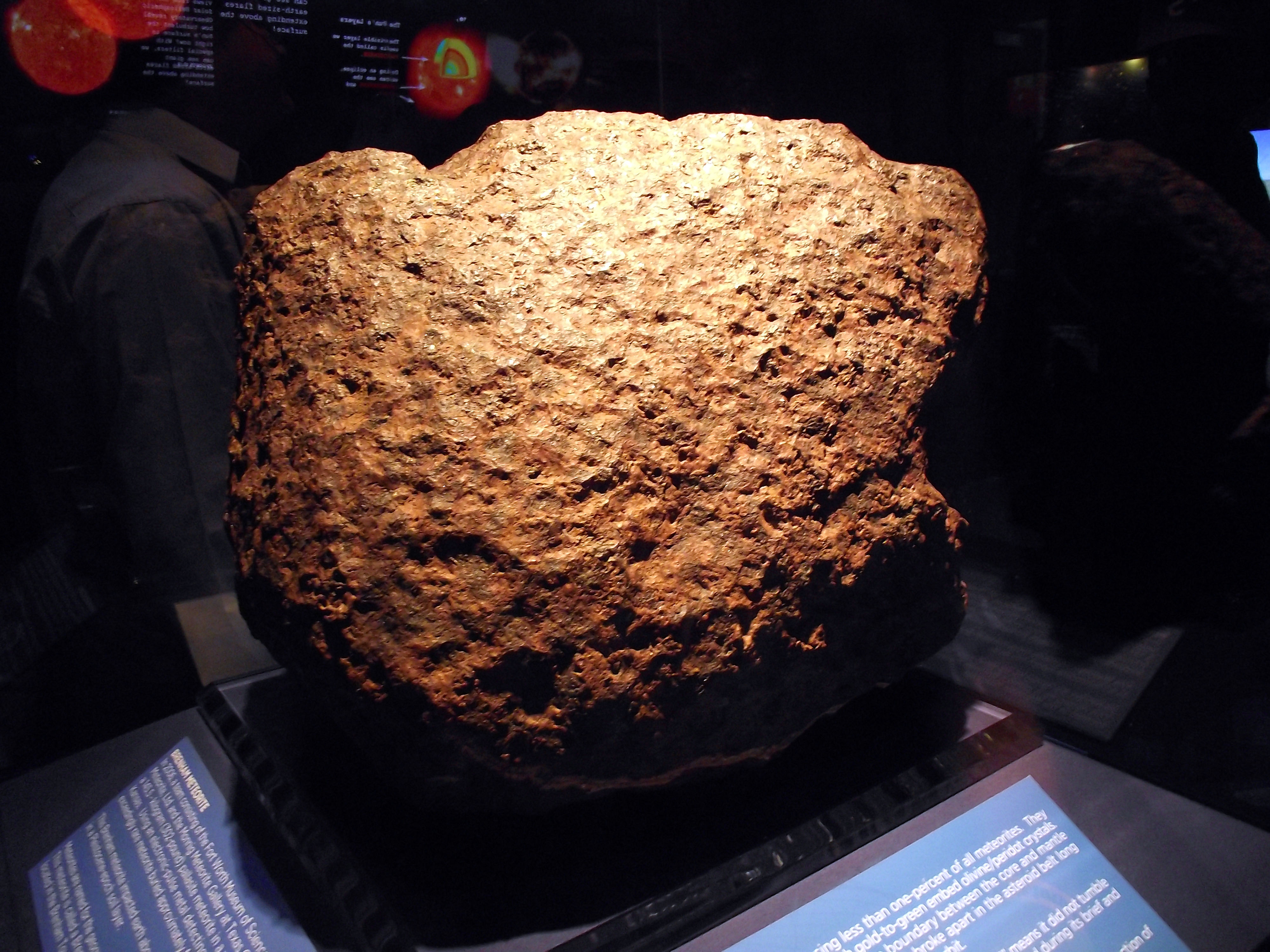
Brenham

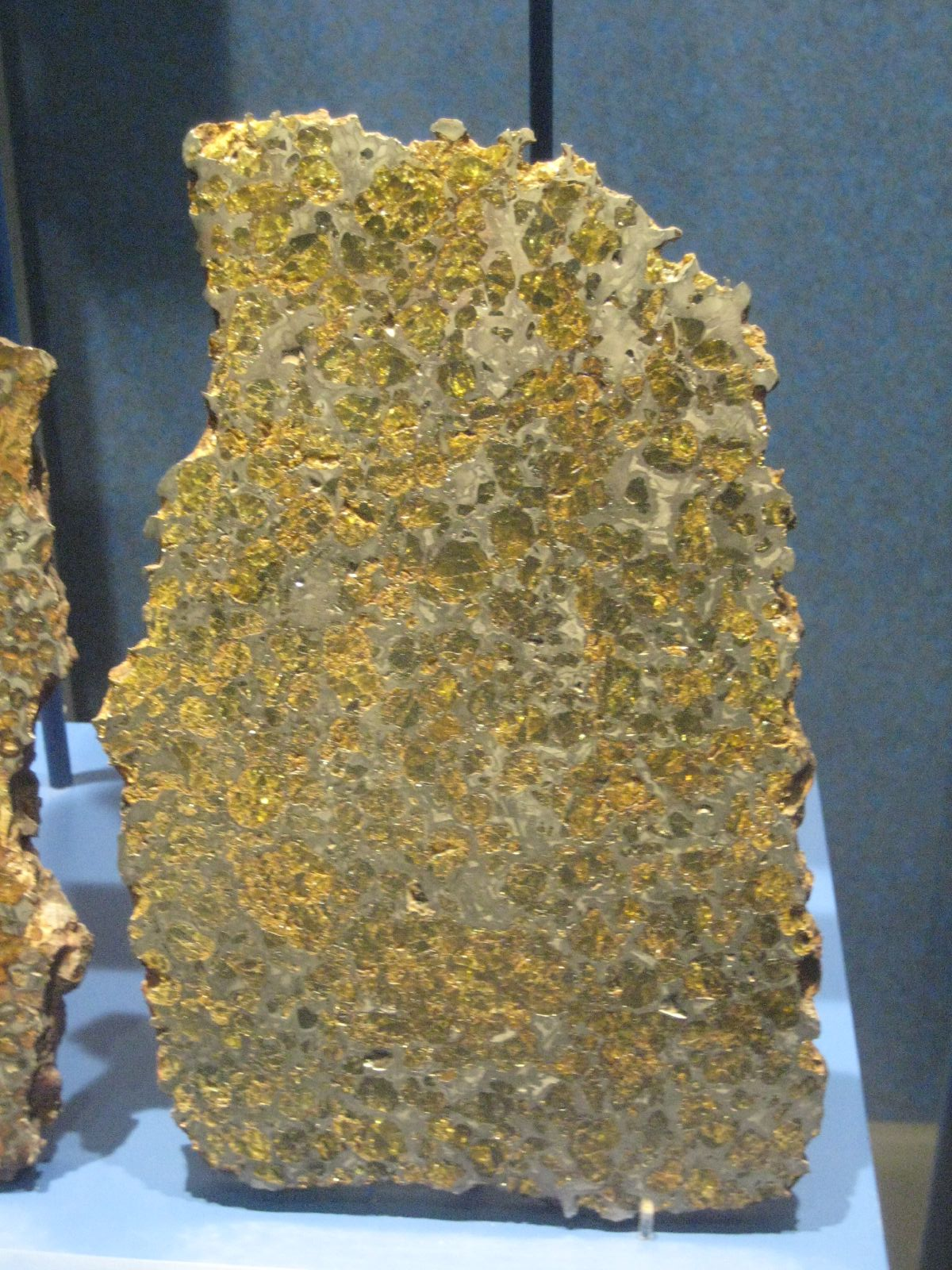
Imilac full slice

Although pallasites are a rare meteorite type, enough pallasite material is found in museums and meteorite collections and is available for research. This is due to several large finds, some of which yielded more than a metric ton. The following are the most notable finds:

- Brenham, southwest Kansas, United States. In 1890, the find of about 20 masses with a total weight of 1,000 kilograms (2,200 lb) around the shallow Haviland Crater were reported. More masses were found later, including one of 454 kilograms (1,001 lb) from a depth of 5 feet (1.5 m), the total amounting to about 4.3 tonnes (4.2 long tons; 4.7 short tons). A piece of 487 kilograms (1,074 lb) is in the Field Museum of Natural History, Chicago. In 2005, Steve Arnold of Arkansas, USA, and Phil Mani of Texas, USA, unearthed a large mass of 650 kilograms (1,430 lb) and in 2006 several new large masses. Don Stimpson and Sheila Knepper have found approximately 8,000 pounds (3,600 kg) of the Brenham meteorite on their farm property.
- Huckitta, Northern Territory, Australia. A mass of 1,400 kilograms (3,100 lb) was found in 1937 on a cattle station northeast of Alice Springs. Earlier, in 1924, a transported piece of about 1 kilogram (2.2 lb) had been found on Burt Plain north of Alice Springs.
- Fukang, Xinjiang Province, China. A mass of 1,003 kilograms (2,211 lb) was recovered in 2000.
- Imilac, Atacama Desert, Chile; known since 1822. Numerous masses up to 200 kilograms (440 lb) were found; the total weight is about 920 kg.
- Brahin, Gomel Region, Belarus, known since 1810. Many masses were found strewn in a field, with a total weight of about 820 kg. An additional mass of 227 kg was found at a depth of 10 feet (3.0 m) in 2002.
- Esquel, Chubut, Argentina. A large mass of 755 kg was found embedded in soil before 1951.
- Pallasovka, Pallasovka, Russia. A single mass of 198 kg was found near Pallasovka, Russia in 1990. Coincidentally, both the town of Pallasovka and pallasite meteorites were named after the naturalist Peter Pallas.
- Krasnojarsk, Yeniseisk, Russia. A mass of about 700 kg was detected in 1749 about 145 miles (233 km) south of Krasnojarsk. It was seen by P. S. Pallas in 1772 and transported to Krasnojarsk (see above). The main mass of 515 kg is now in Moscow at the Academy of Sciences. Pallasites are named after Peter Pallas for his study of this meteorite.
- Seymchan, discovered near the town by the same name, in far eastern Russia in 1967. This main group Pallasite has some areas free of olivine crystals, and may have formed near the junction of the core and the mantle of an asteroid. Multiple masses in excess of 1 tonne have been recovered.
- The Hambleton Pallasite, a 17.5 kg fragment found in 2005 in Hambleton, North Yorkshire, UK, which may be related to the 1783 Great Meteor, based on the latter's track, and on weathering on the pallasite's surface.

== See also ==
- Glossary of meteoritics
- Port Orford meteorite hoax
- Peridotite
