= Pallasite main group =

Main class of pallasite meteorites

- — Group —
- Compositional type: Stony-iron
- Class: Pallasite
- Subgroups
- Alternative names: Pallasite main groups, Main group pallasite, Main group pallasites

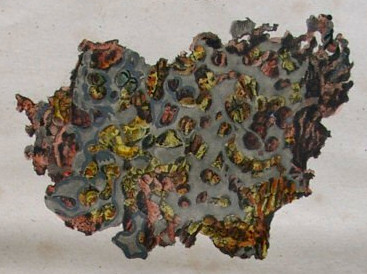
Hand-colored drawing of the meteorite Krasnojarsk (Pallas iron)

Almost all pallasite meteorites are part of the pallasite main group.
