= Merrillite =

Phosphate mineral

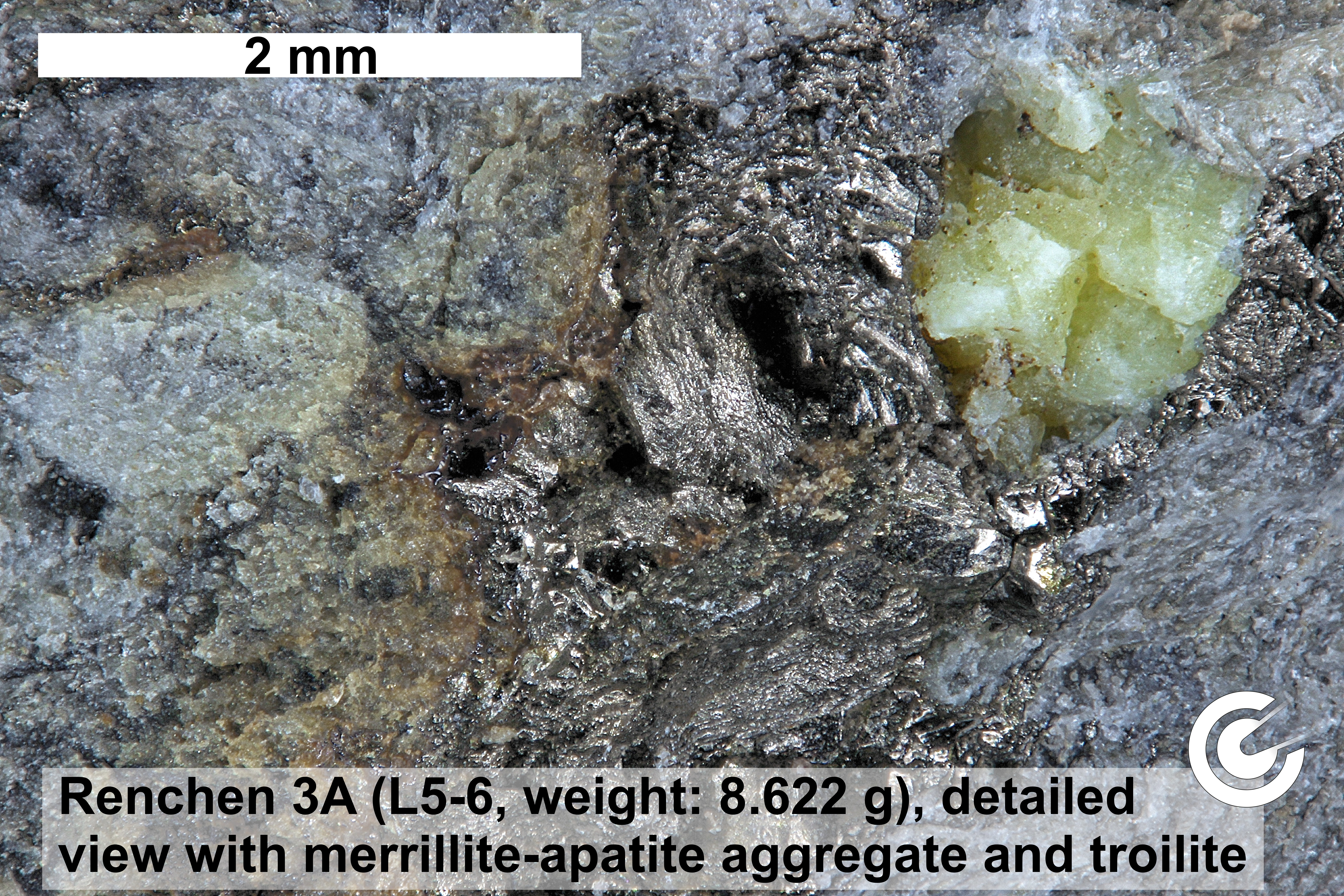

General
- Category: Phosphate mineral
- Formula: Ca_{9}NaMg(PO_{4})_{7}
- IMA symbol: Mer
- Strunz classification: 8.AC.45
- Crystal system: Trigonal
- Crystal class: Ditrigonal pyramidal (3m) (same H-M symbol)
- Space group: R3c
- Unit cell: a = 10.362 Å, c = 37.106 Å; Z = 6

Identification
- Color: Colorless to white
- Crystal habit: Occurs as anhedral grains
- Cleavage: Poor - indistinct
- Tenacity: Brittle
- Luster: Vitreous
- Specific gravity: 3.1 (measured)
- Optical properties: Uniaxial (-)
- Refractive index: n_{ε}=1.62, n_{ω}=1.623
- Birefringence: 0.0030

Merrillite is a calcium phosphate mineral with the chemical formula Ca_{9}NaMg(PO_{4})_{7}. It is an anhydrous, sodium-rich member of the merrillite group of minerals.

== Mineral species, sub-group and group ==
Merrillite is a distinct mineral species but it also gives its name to a set of similar minerals, which together form the merrillite sub-group of minerals. The merrillite sub-group and the whitlockite sub-group together form the merrillite group of minerals.

- Merrillite Group
  - Merrillite Sub-group
    - Ferromerrillite
    - Keplerite
    - Matyhite
    - Merrillite
  - Whitlockite Sub-group
    - Hedegaardite
    - Strontiowhitlockite
    - Whitlockite
    - Wopmayite

Merrillite can form a partial solid solution with whitlockite.

In September 2022 the discovery of another merrillite group mineral, changesite–(Y), was announced, but, as of September 2022, it is not yet clear where this new mineral sits in the merrillite group hierarchy.

== Discovery and naming ==
Merrillite is named after George P. Merrill (1854–1929) of the Smithsonian Institution. In 1915, Merrill had described the mineral from four meteorites: Alfianello, Dhurmsala, Pultusk and Rich Mountain. Merrillite has also been reported from the Renchen meteorite (a well-documented fall that occurred on 10 July 2018 at 21:29 UTC in southwestern Germany), occurring in the form of a merrillite–apatite aggregate. However, it was not until 1975 that it was recognized as distinct from whitlockite by the International Mineralogical Association.

== Occurrence ==
Merrillite is a very important constituent of extraterrestrial rocks. It occurs as a primary phosphate in lunar and martian rocks, and in meteorites (e.g., pallasites and martian meteorites).

In 2022, for the first time, merrillite was found in a terrestrial environment, as an inclusion in lower-mantle diamonds from Sorriso River, Juína, Brazil.
