= Stony-iron meteorite =

Meteorites that consist of nearly equal parts of meteoric iron and silicates

Stony-iron meteorite (siderolites)
- — Type —
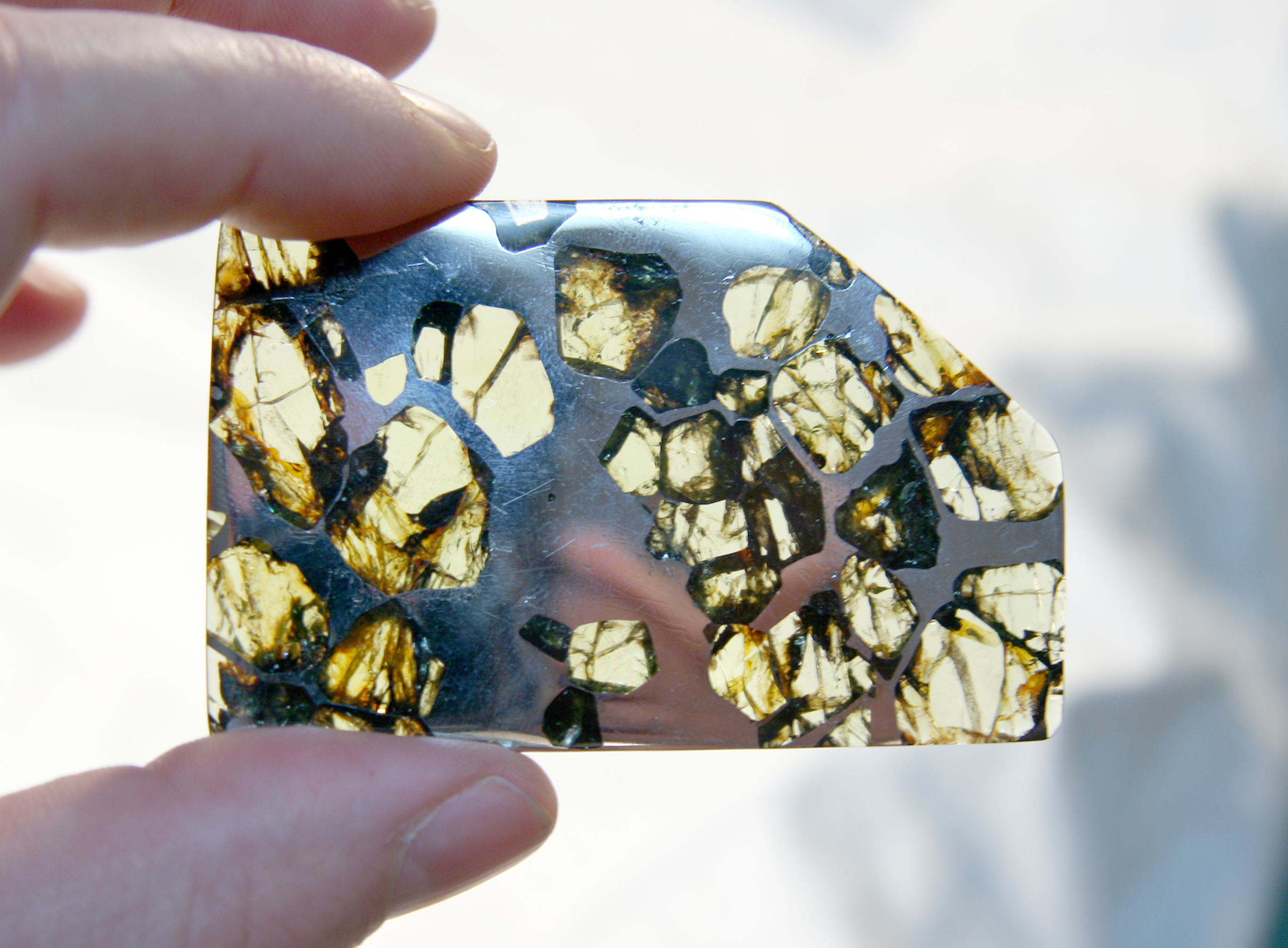
- A slice of the Esquel meteorite showing the mixture of meteoric iron and silicates that is typical of this division.
- Type: Stony-iron
- Subgroups: Pallasite; Mesosiderite
- Composition: Meteoric iron (kamacite, taenite & tetrataenite); silicates
- Total known specimens: 95 pallasites, 183 mesosiderites (278 Total)

Stony-iron meteorites or siderolites are meteorites that consist of nearly equal parts of meteoric iron and silicates. This distinguishes them from the stony meteorites, that are mostly silicates, and the iron meteorites, that are mostly meteoric iron.

Stony-iron meteorites are all differentiated, meaning that they show signs of alteration. They are therefore achondrites.

The stony-irons are divided into mesosiderites and pallasites. Pallasites have a matrix of meteoric iron with embedded silicates (most of it olivine). Mesosiderites are breccias which show signs of metamorphism. The meteoric iron occurs in clasts instead of a matrix.

They are in the top rank of all Meteorite classification schemes, usually called "Type".

== Mineralogy ==
The meteoric iron of stony-irons is similar to that of iron meteorites, consisting mostly of kamacite and taenite in different proportions. The silicates are dominated by olivine. Accessory minerals that also include non-silicates are: carlsbergite, chromite, cohenite, daubréelite, feldspar, graphite, ilmenite, merrillite, low-calcium pyroxene, schreibersite, tridymite and troilite.

== See also ==
- Glossary of meteoritics
