= Total known weight =

Term used by meteorite collectors to indicate the combined weight of named meteorites

Total known weight (TKW), also total known mass, is a term used mainly by dealers and meteorite collectors to indicate the combined weight of all known pieces from a single named meteorite. The total known mass of a named meteorite is a fraction of the mass of the original meteoroid that entered Earth's atmosphere to produce the meteorite (also called post-atmospheric mass).

== Mass and TKW ==
Meteoroids that produce meteorites ablate as they pass through the atmosphere and lose mass. Thus, the total mass of a meteorite fall will always be lower than that of the original meteoroid (neglecting the mass of any terrestrial oxygen added to meteorites during the formation of their fusion crust). The upper limit to the "total known mass" of a meteorite is therefore the mass of the meteorite fall.

Several factors can cause the "total known mass" of a meteorite to be less than the mass of the fall. Meteorite falls frequently occur as showers of stones (see main article), produced when the parent meteoroid fragments. Only in cases where 100% of any such fragments are recovered, could the "total known mass" be the same as the mass of the fall. As previously undiscovered fragments are found, the "total known mass" could, in principle, rise. However, this is complicated by the method by which meteorites are named. Historically (before the 1970s), every meteorite was given a simple geographical name. The total number of known meteorites was small and it was generally a simple matter to determine when a newly found fragment was "paired" to a previously discovered meteorite. When pairing could be established, the new fragment would not be given a new name, and the "total known mass" of the original meteorite would increase. But, recent discoveries of arid regions containing large concentrations of meteorites have resulted in new rules for meteorite nomenclature. In these cases, individual meteorites are numbered, and every newly discovered fragment receives a unique number, even if there is a strong case that the new fragment is paired with an earlier discovered meteorite. In these cases, the "total known mass" of the meteorite is fixed at the time of the find, and cannot increase.

== Use ==
Low TKW means less materials for scientists and collectors. The total known weight is a key factor in pricing, especially with rare meteorite types.

== See also ==
- Glossary of meteoritics
