= IVB =

IVB may refer to:

- IVB meteorites, a group of iron meteorites
- Innsbrucker Verkehrsbetriebe, which runs the public transport system in Innsbruck
- The British Virgin Islands.
- Intel 3rd Generation Core Ivy Bridge (microarchitecture)
