= IVB meteorite =

Type of iron meteorite

IVB meteorites
- — Group —
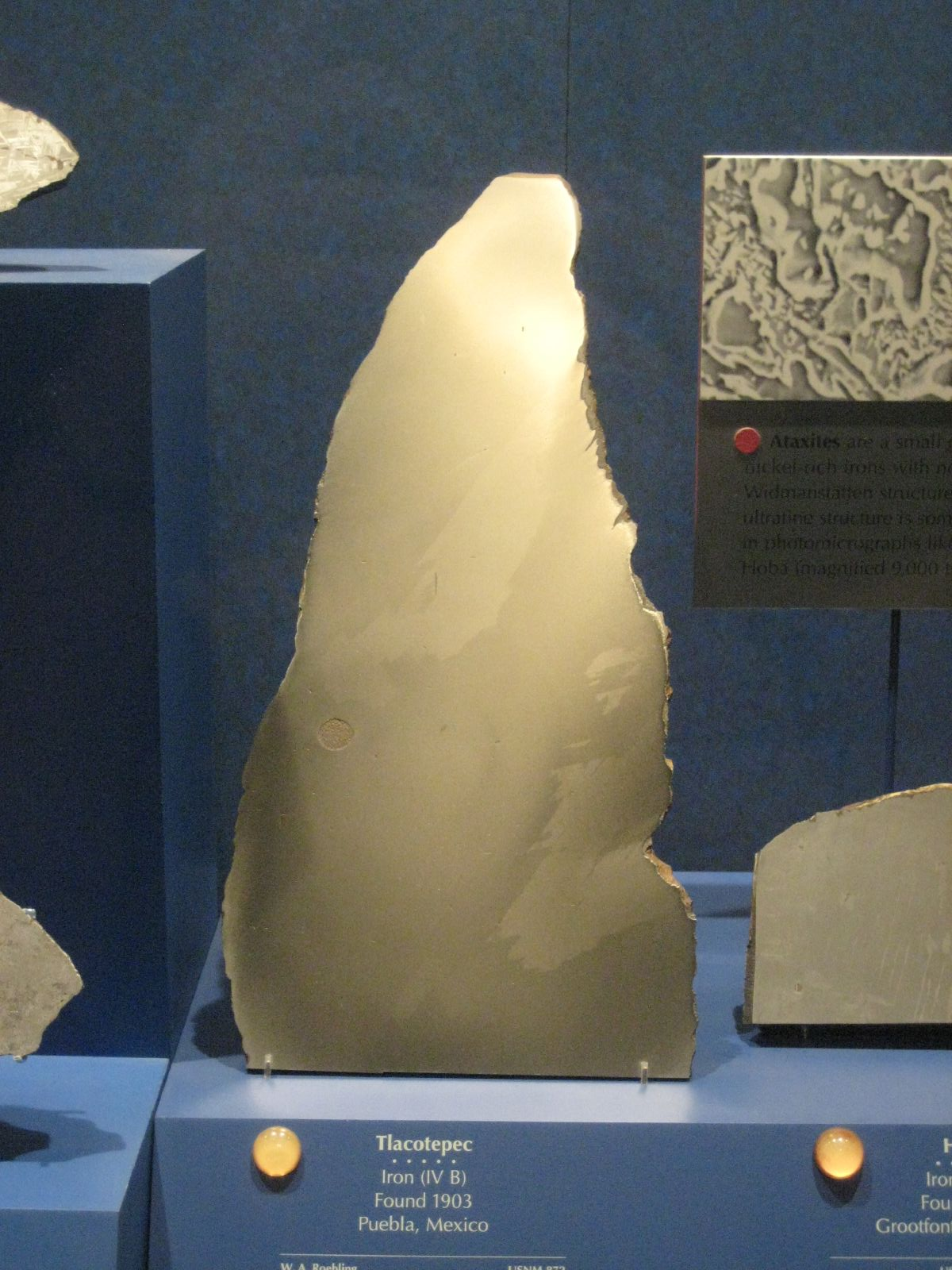
- Tlacotepec is one of 14 known IVB specimens; in contrast to most IVBs it is an octahedrite instead of an ataxite
- Type: Iron
- Structural classification: Most are ataxites (without structure) but show microscopic Widmanstätten patterns
- Class: Magmatic
- Subgroups: None?
- Parent body: IVB
- Composition: Meteoric iron (kamacite, taenite & tetrataenite); low in volatile elements, high in nickel & refractory elements
- Total known specimens: 14

IVB meteorites are a group of ataxite iron meteorites classified as achondrites. The IVB group has the most extreme chemical compositions of all iron meteorites, meaning that examples of the group are depleted in volatile elements and enriched in refractory elements compared to other iron meteorites.

== Description ==
The IVB meteorites are composed of meteoric iron (kamacite, taenite and tetrataenite). The chemical composition is low in volatile elements and high in nickel and refractory elements. Although most IVB meteorites are ataxites ("without structure"), they do show microscopic Widmanstätten patterns. The lamellae are smaller than 20 μm wide and lie in a matrix of plessite. The Tlacotepec meteorite is an octahedrite, making a notable exception, as most IVBs are ataxites.

== Classification ==
Iron meteorites were originally divided into four groups designated by Roman numerals (I, II, III, IV). When more chemical data became available some groups were split. Group IV was split into IVA and IVB meteorites. The chemical classification is based on diagrams that plot nickel content against different trace elements (e.g. gallium, germanium and iridium). The different iron meteorite groups appear as data point clusters.

== Parent body ==
IVB meteorites formed the core of a parent body that was later destroyed, some of the fragments falling on Earth as meteorites. Modeling the IVB parent body has to take into account the extreme chemical composition, especially the depletion of volatile elements (gallium, germanium) and the enrichment in refractory elements (iridium) compared to other iron meteorites.

The history of the parent body has been reconstructed in detail. The IVB parent body will have formed from material that condensed at the highest temperatures while the solar nebula cooled off. The enrichment in refractory elements was caused by less than 10 % of the condensible material going into the parent body. Thermal models suggest that the IVB parent body formed 0.3 million years after the formation of the calcium-aluminium-rich inclusions, and at a distance from the sun of 0.9 Astronomical units.

Differentiation of the planet body into a core and mantle was most likely driven by the heat produced by the decay of ^{26}Al and ^{60}Fe. The high nickel concentrations were caused by oxidizing physical conditions. The chemical variation of IVB specimens can be explained as different stages of the fractional crystallization of the convecting core of the parent body. The exact size of the parent body is still debated. Modelling of cooling rates suggest that it had a 140 ± 30 km radius with a 70 ± 15 km radius core. The fast cooling rates are explained by a grazing-shot collision of the parent body with a larger asteroid. This removed the mantle from the parent body, leaving the shattered iron core behind to rapidly cool.

== Notable specimens ==
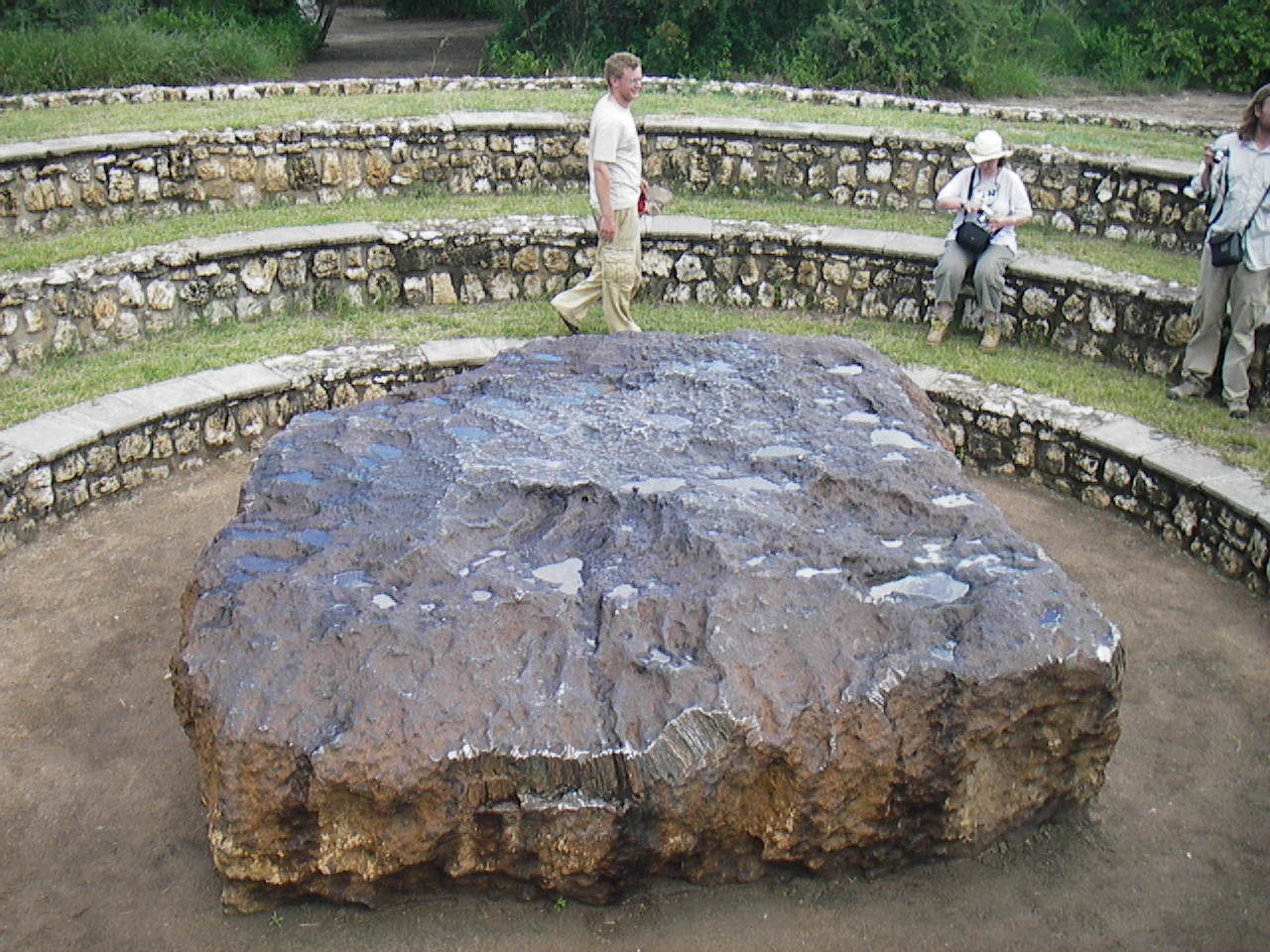
The Hoba meteorite is the largest meteorite specimen ever found.

As of December 2012, 14 specimens of IVB meteorites are known. A notable specimen is the Hoba meteorite, the largest known intact meteorite. There has never been an observed fall of an IVB meteorite.

== See also ==
- Glossary of meteoritics
