= Tlacotepec meteorite =

Iron meteorite from Mexico

Tlacotepec
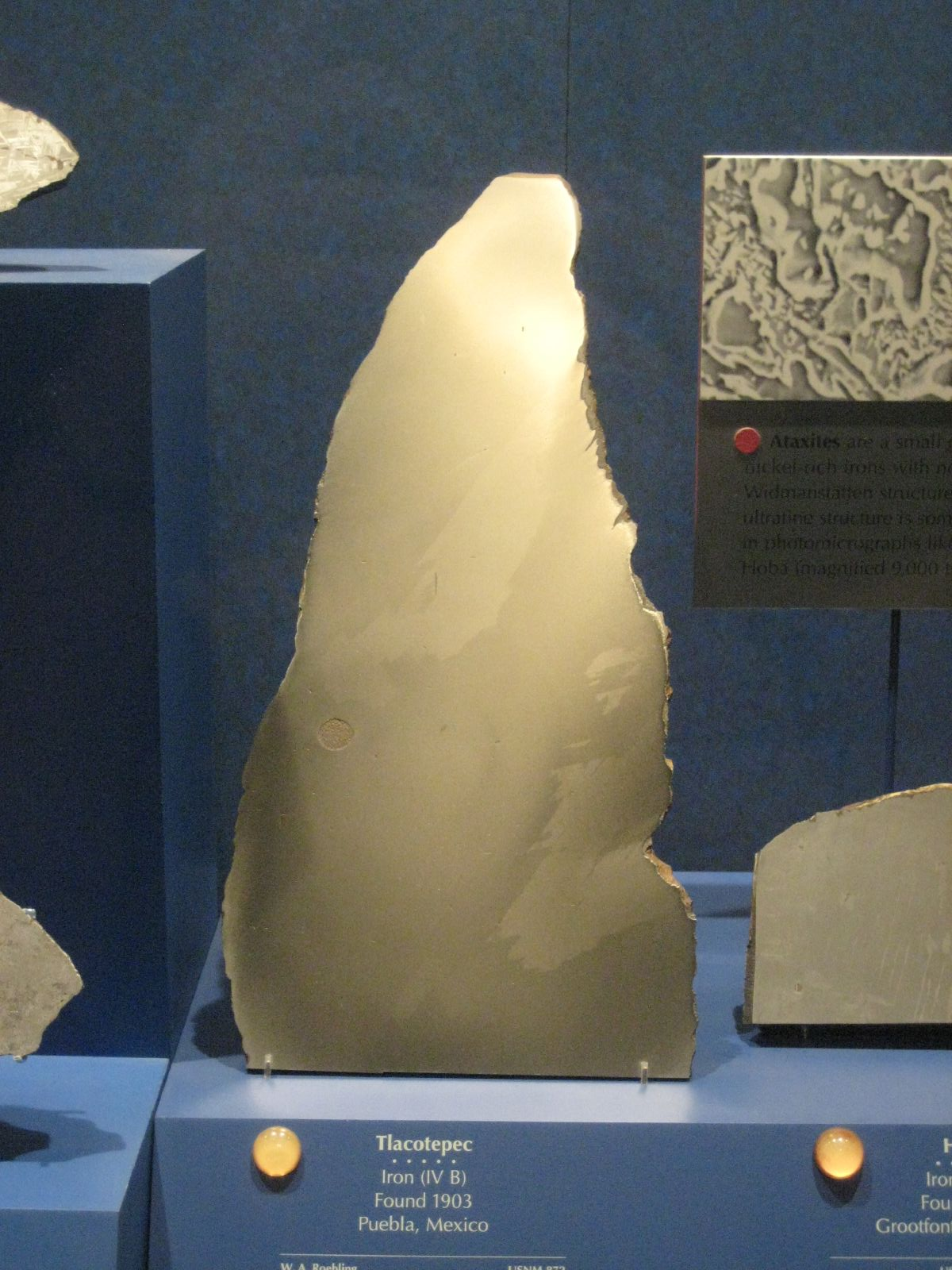
- Type: Iron
- Structural classification: Octahedrite
- Group: IVB
- Country: Mexico
- Coordinates: 18°39′N 97°33′W
- Observed fall: No
- Found date: 1903
- TKW: 71 kilograms (157 lb)

The Tlacotepec meteorite is an iron meteorite classified as an IVB meteorite. It is the only meteorite of the IVB group that is an octahedrite.

The meteorite is named after Tlacotepec, Guerrero (Mexico).

== See also ==
- Glossary of meteoritics
