= Refractory (planetary science) =

Materials with high condensation temperatures, contrasted with volatiles

In planetary science, any material that has a relatively high equilibrium condensation temperature is called refractory. The opposite of refractory is volatile.

The refractory group includes elements and compounds like metals and silicates (commonly termed rocks) which make up the bulk of the mass of the terrestrial planets and asteroids in the inner belt. A fraction of the mass of other asteroids, giant planets, their moons and trans-Neptunian objects is also made of refractory materials.

== Classification ==
The elements can be divided into several categories:

| Category | Condensation Temperature Range (Kelvin) | Elements |
|---|---|---|
| Super-refractory | T ≥ 1700 | Re, Os, W, Zr, Hf |
| Refractory | 1700 ≥ T ≥ 1500 | Al, Sc, Ca, Ti, Th, Lu, Tb, Dy, Ho, Er, Tm, Ir, Ru, Mo, U, Sm, Nd, La |
| Moderately refractory | 1500 ≥ T ≥ 1300 | Nb, Be, V, Ce, Yb, Pt, Fe, Co, Ni, Pd, Mg, Eu, Si, Cr |
| Moderately volatile | 1300 ≥ T ≥ 1100 | Au, P, Li, Sr, Mn, Cu, Ba |
| Volatile | 1100 ≥ T ≥ 700 | Rb, Cs, K, Ag, Na, B, Ga, Sn, Se, S |
| Very volatile | 700 ≥ T | Zn, Pb, In, Bi, Tl |

The condensation temperatures are the temperatures at which 50% of the element will be in the form of a solid (rock) under a pressure of 10^{−4} bar. However, slightly different groups and temperature ranges are used sometimes. Refractory material are also often divided into refractory lithophile elements and refractory siderophile elements.
