= Gibeon =

Gibeon (Hebrew: גִּבְעוֹן giḇʻôn, giv'ôn) may refer to:

- Gibeon (ancient city), a Canaanite city north of Jerusalem that was conquered by Joshua
  - Pool of Gibeon, a site in Gibeon mentioned a number of times in the Hebrew Bible
- Gibeon, Namibia, a village in the Hardap region of Namibia
  - Gibeon Constituency, the constituency whose administrative centre is the Namibian village of Gibeon
  - Gibeon (meteorite), an iron meteorite found in Namibia near Gibeon
  - Gibeon railway station, a railway station serving the town of Gibeon in Namibia
- Gibeon Bradbury (1833–1904), painter from Buxton, Maine, United States
- Giv'on HaHadashah (Hebrew: גִּבְעוֹן הַחֲדָשָׁה), an Israeli communal settlement northwest of Jerusalem
- Thomas Givon (born 1936), Hebrew: Talmy Givón, linguist, rancher, musician and writer
