= Buzzard Coulee meteorite =

November 20, 2008 Canadian meteorites

Buzzard Coulee
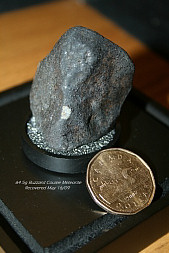
- 64.5 gram Buzzard Coulee sample
- Type: Chondrite
- Class: Ordinary chondrite
- Group: H4
- Shock stage: S2
- Weathering grade: W0
- Country: Canada
- Region: Saskatchewan, Canada
- Coordinates: 52°59′46″N 109°50′53″W
- Observed fall: Yes
- Fall date: November 20, 2008
- Found date: November 27, 2008
- TKW: 41 kilograms (90 lb)
- Strewn field: Yes
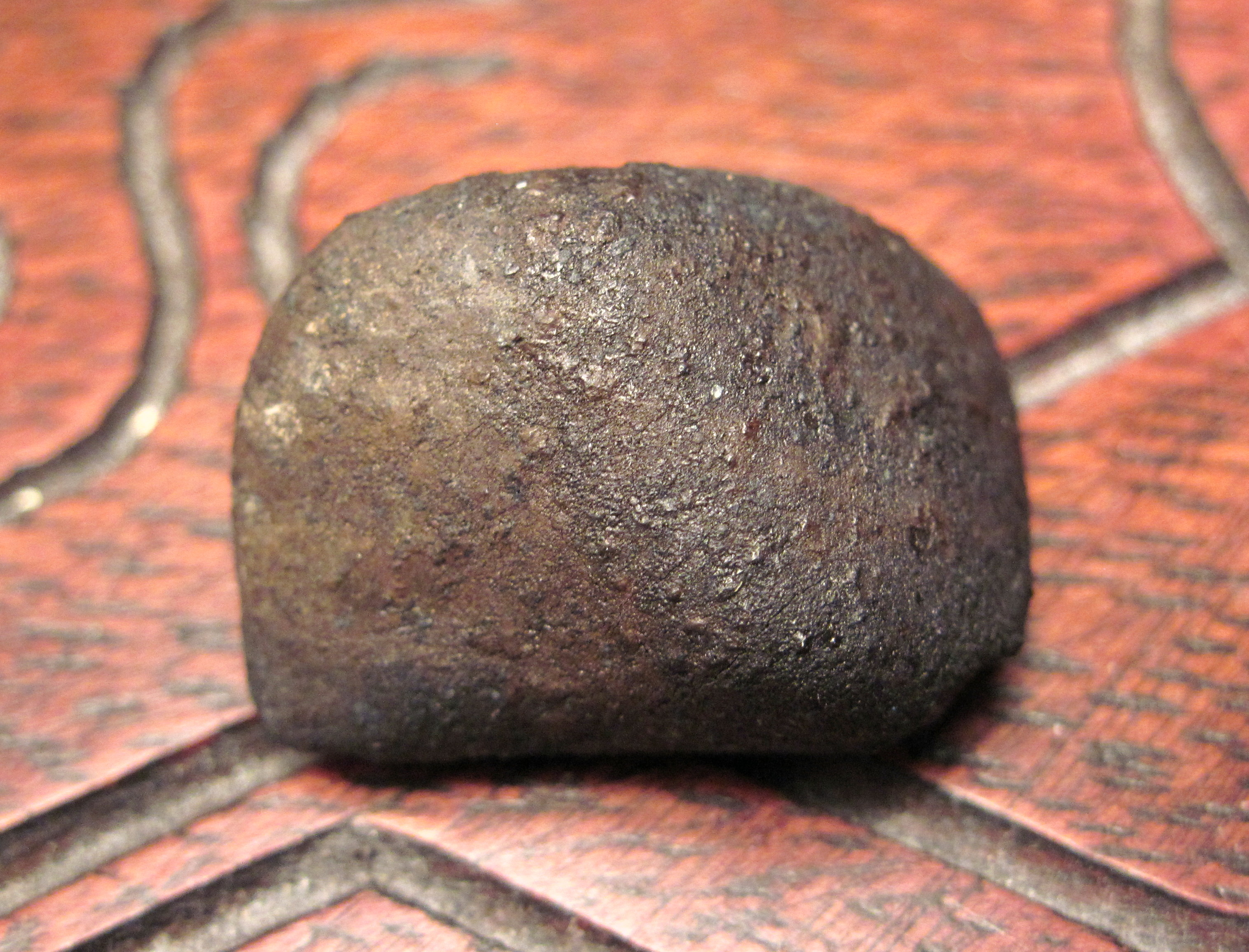
- Buzzard Coulee, 12.3g sample.
- Related media on Wikimedia Commons

Buzzard Coulee is the collective name of the meteorites fallen on November 20, 2008, over Saskatchewan, Canada.

== History ==
The fireball was first spotted at around 17:30 MST (00:30 UTC) (ISO 8601 format: 2008-11-21T00:30Z) and was reported by people living in Alberta, Saskatchewan, Manitoba, and even North Dakota. It was five times as bright as a full moon. Over 400 people reported seeing it. There are several videos of the meteoroid on YouTube. The object split into multiple pieces before widespread impact. The meteoroid entered the atmosphere at approximately 14 kilometres per second and is estimated to have been about the size of a desk and have had a mass of approximately 10 tonnes.

The village of Marsden, Saskatchewan became a hub of activity for meteorite hunters, being just south of the estimated 20 square kilometre debris field. Locals dubbed the object the "Marsden Meteor"; many of the residents reported seeing, hearing and even smelling the burning fragments as they fell. The meteor was also referred to as the "Buzzard Coulee fireball", named after the area where searchers found the first fragments. Buzzard Coulee is located approximately 2 kilometres (1.2 mi) from the Battle River valley.

The first pieces of the rock were found by Ellen Milley, a University of Calgary Master's student on November 27, 2008. Milley was a part of a team working with Dr. Alan Hildebrand, University of Calgary professor and Canadian Research Chair in Planetary Science in the ice of a fish pond about 40 kilometres (25 mi) south east of Lloydminster, Saskatchewan, near the hamlet of Lone Rock. Lone Rock, Battle River, Marsden and other names were possible candidates for the meteorite name, but the University of Calgary researchers followed the local residents' lead in officially calling the fall Buzzard Coulee, after the oldest-named geographic feature in the fall area. Ten pieces were initially found; the largest fragment weighed 380 grams (13 oz) and smallest was 10 grams (0.35 oz).

In total, more than one thousand meteorite fragments have been collected from the 10-tonne fireball, among them are two 13 kilograms (29 lb) fragments. This event has set a new Canadian record for the most number of pieces recovered from a single meteorite fall.

Robert A. Haag, a famous American meteorite hunter, offered $10,000 to anyone who gave him the first one-kilogram chunk of the meteorite.

"We can see on the videos that there were three big pieces that continue here. And those aren't found yet," said Alan Hildebrand on May 4, 2009. The meteorite hunters have collected over 1,000 fragments. The largest found to date was 13 kilograms (29 lb).

== Classification ==
Buzzard Coulee was classified as ordinary chondrite H4 with a shock stage S2 and a weathering grade W0.

== See also ==
- Glossary of meteoritics
