= Ingobamakhosi Carbineers =

South African Army unit

Royal Natal Carbineers Natal Carbineers Ingobamakhosi Carbineers
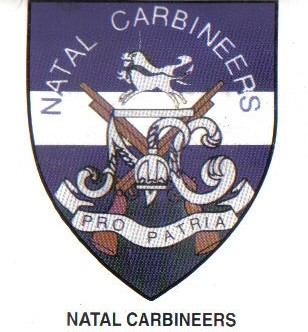
- Natal Carbineers Insignia
- Active: 13 March 1855 to present
- Country: South Africa
- Allegiance: Republic of South Africa; Republic of South Africa (1994–present)
- Branch: South African Army; South African Army (1994–present)
- Type: Infantry
- Role: Motorised Infantry
- Size: One Battalion
- Part of: South African Infantry Formation; Army Conventional Reserve
- Garrison/HQ: The Drill Hall, Pietermaritzburg
- Nickname: One Carbs
- Motto: Pro Patria (For the Fatherland)
- Anniversaries: 13 March (Regimental Day)

Commanders
- Officer Commanding: Lieutenant Colonel M. Mhlope

Insignia
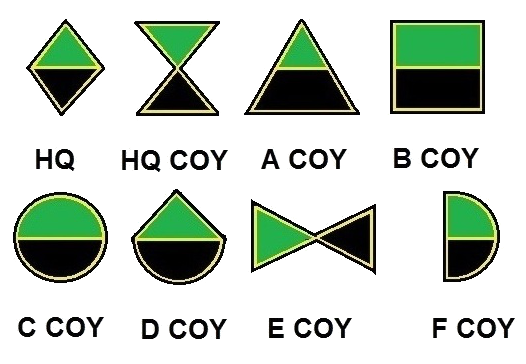
- Company level Insignia

- SA Motorised Infantry beret bar circa 1992: SA Motorised Infantry beret bar
- Abbreviation: IC

The Ingobamakhosi Carbineers (formerly Natal Carbineers) is an infantry unit of the South African Army.

== History ==
=== Origins ===
The regiment traces its roots to 1854 but it was formally raised on 15 January 1855 and gazetted on 13 March of that year, as the Natal Carbineers.

=== With the Union Defence Force ===
In 1913, the regiment's two 'wings' became known as the First and Second Mounted Rifles (Natal Carbineers) and in 1934 they re-assumed the name 1st and 2nd Natal Carbineers.

The following year, they became the Royal Natal Carbineers, a title which remained in use until the country became a republic in 1961.

=== Present ===
The regiment has been active since 1994 in internal duties in support of the police as well as border protection. They have also contributed to external peace-keeping missions to inter alia MONUSCO in the DRC.

==== Name change ====
In August 2019, 52 Reserve Force units had their names changed to reflect the diverse military history of South Africa. The Natal Carbineers became the Ingobamakhosi Carbineers, and have three years to design and implement new regimental insignia. The new name was decided on to reflect the merging of two proud military traditions. Ingobamakhosi (Note: Ingobamakhosi Zulu regiment who fought in the left flank of the Zulu line at the 1879 Battle of Isandlwana and fought against the Natal Carbineers.) which was a Zulu Regiment in the 19th century and Carbineers to reflect the horse-borne, carbine bearing soldiers (Note: Formed in the Colony of Natal in 1855, a carbine is a shortened rifle used by mounted men.) that formed the regiment. A loose translation of the new name could be "The King's Own Carbineers" (Note: Ingobamakhosi could also be translated as "Benders/Humblers of Kings).

== List of campaign and battle honours ==
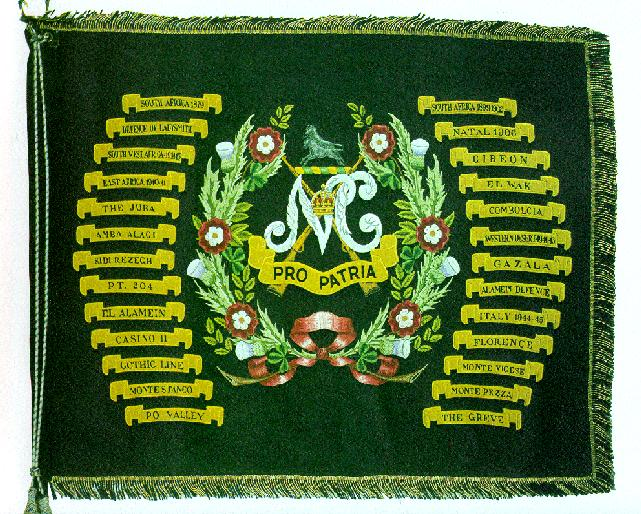
The Natal Carbineers Regimental Colour. Once a new insignia has been approved, these Colours will be laid up and a new Colour will be designed for the Ingobamakhosi Carbineers Regimental Colour

Since its inception, the Natal Carbineers (Note: The Ingobamamakhosi, have not participated in any campaigns or battles that have been awarded Battle Honours. All the Battle Honours were awarded prior to amalgamation in 1994) have participated in every campaign in KwaZulu-Natal. Their baptism of fire came during the Langalibalele Rebellion in 1873 where they suffered their first casualties in action in the Drakensberg. Subsequently, during the Anglo-Zulu War, the Carbineers suffered minor losses at the Battle of Isandlwana on 22 January 1879.

=== South Africa 1879 ===
The Natal Carbineers participated in the invasion of Zululand in January 1879, and on 22 January, 23 members of the Regiment perished in the famous battle of Isandlwana. The unit was subsequently relegated to garrison duties at Landman's Drift on the Mzinyathi, or Buffalo River.

=== South Africa 1899–1902 ===
In September 1899, the Natal Carbineers were mobilised for active service in the British campaign to subdue the Boer republics of the Transvaal and Orange Free State. The Regiment served until October 1900, when the Natal Volunteer Forces were demobilized. Some men continued their service in the Volunteer Composite Regiment until the end of the war in May 1902.

- Ladysmith, KwaZulu-Natal: From 2 November 1899 until 28 February 1900, the bulk of the Natal Carbineers was besieged in Ladysmith, and played a prominent part in that famous engagement. The most prominent military action was the attack by Colonial Forces on the Boer artillery emplacement at Gun Hill on the night of 7–8 December 1899. The Regiment lost heavily from the diseases that ravaged the garrison. A solitary squadron of the Natal Carbineers, the Estcourt-Weenen Squadron, avoided the siege of Ladysmith, and instead participated in the relief operations of Sir Redvers Buller as part of Hubert Gough's Composite Regiment. This squadron's most notable military action of this period was the disastrous battle of Colenso on 15 December 1899, when four men were killed. These were their most serious losses for any one action during the Anglo-Boer War.

=== Natal 1906 ===
The Natal Carbineers saw extensive service in the Natal (or Bambatha) Uprising of 1906. From February to July 1906, the Regiment participated in the numerous sweeps and drives through the mountainous terrain of Zululand, as the Natal Colonial forces sought to trap and destroy the elusive 'rebel' warriors. The Carbineers were present at the decisive battle at Mhome Gorge on 10 June, where the back of the uprising was broken.

=== South-West Africa 1914–1915 ===
The Natal Carbineers, then known as the 1st and 2nd Mounted Rifles, were mobilized on 23 August 1914. Both wings saw service in German South-West Africa, while the 2nd Battalion was also involved in the suppression of the short-lived Afrikaner Rebellion of 1914.

- Gibeon: The climactic battle of the South African campaign in German South-West Africa was fought at Gibeon Station on 25 April 1915. The Carbineers lost two men killed in the engagement.

=== East Africa 1940–1941 ===
On 17 July 1940 the 1st (Royal) Natal Carbineers sailed for Kenya as part of the 1st South African Brigade. Their destination was the Italian colonial empire in East Africa. For the next 10 months the Regiment participated in the South African advance through Italian Somaliland and Abyssinia (now Ethiopia), until Italian resistance was broken at Amba Alagi in May 1941.

- El Wak: The first major engagement of the East African campaign for the Carbineers was fought on 16 December 1940 at the Italian border post of El Wak, on the northern Kenyan frontier with Italian Somaliland. The Regiment lost its first World War II casualty, Sergeant Athol Paton, in this otherwise successful clash.
- The Juba: The Juba River was the Italian Army's major defensive line in Somaliland. Several actions were fought during January and February 1941, at Gobwen and Giumbo, but the period is best remembered for the disastrous ambush on 22 February of a Carbineer patrol at Gelib. Twelve men lost their lives.
- Kombolcha: The engagement at Kombolcha in Ethiopia on 22 April 1941 followed the occupation of the capital city, Addis Ababa in March. The fighting at Kombolcha was distinguished by a daring nocturnal route march to successfully outflank Italian mountain-top positions. The battle honour awards refer to the general period 17 to 25 April.
- Amba Alagi: Italian resistance in East Africa was finally crushed when the mountain fortress of Amba Alagi, between Dessie and Asmara, was successfully stormed by British and Commonwealth forces that included the 1st Royal Natal Carbineers. The Italians surrendered on 17 May 1941, and this battle honour refers to the period from 11 to 19 April.

=== Western Desert 1941–1943 ===
Following the fall of Italian East Africa in May 1941, the 1st South African Brigade was dispatched to North Africa to confront the joint Italian-German forces in the see-saw offensives across Egypt and Libya. The Carbineers earned numerous individual battle honours between June 1941 and January 1943 when it sailed home for a well-earned leave.

- Sidi Rezegh: The 1st Royal Natal Carbineers played a small part in the disastrous battles in the vicinity of Sidi Rezegh in Libya during late November 1941, between the 19th and 23rd. These actions formed part of Operation Crusader, the British forces of November–December 1941, intended to relieve the first siege of Tobruk.
- Taieb el Essem: The Carbineers were a component of the 1st Brigade force that held a defensive box south of Sidi Rezegh. On 24–25 November 1941 this force repelled a heavy German armoured assault.
- Bir Sciafsciuf: This minor engagement in November 1941 pitted a small Carbineer component against an enemy convoy in the vicinity of Sidi Rezegh.
- Gazala: The Gazala Line, to the west of Tobruk, established in early 1942, was a series of connected strong-points intended to blunt a German thrust towards Egypt. Carbineers formed part of the garrison of this line from March to June 1942, when they were forced to retreat after a German breakthrough and the fall of Tobruk. The major highlight of the Gazala sojourn was the patrol on 5 June where Sergeant Quentin Smythe was awarded the Victoria Cross.
- Point 204: This little-known clash occurred in the Alem Hamza area of the Gazala Line on 5 June 1942. The single company involved suffered heavy casualties in an engagement with Italian troops. Among the six killed was H.P. Masterton-Smith, the 1931 Comrades Marathon winner.
- El Alamein defence: Following the breaching of the Gazala Line and the fall of Tobruk, British and Commonwealth forces retired to El Alamein, not far from Alexandria. Here a comprehensive series of defences were prepared. In July 1942 the Carbineers played its part in denying the Germans the breakthrough that they needed to attain victory in this theatre.
- Qattara: On 26–27 July 1942 a detachment of the Carbineers was involved in this subsidiary action in the Alamein defensive battles of July 1942.
- El Alamein (2nd battle): The Carbineers played a small but eventful part in the huge and decisive Second Battle of El Alamein in October–November 1942. The Carbineer participation was confined mainly to the initial phase launched on 23 October.

=== Italy 1944–1945 ===
The 1st Royal Natal Carbineers landed at Taranto, Italy, on 20 April 1944, just in time for the latter phases of the battles for Cassino. From there the Regiment fought its way up the Italian boot, through Rome, until final victory in May 1945.

- Cassino: The task of breaching the German Gustav Line, straddling southern Italy, was dominated by the mountain position of Cassino, under assault since January 1944. The Carbineers entered the fray in May, and it was on the night of the 9th–10th of that month that the Regiment's first casualty in Italy, Corporal J.S.P. Airey, was killed. The Carbineers were active on the Cassino line for several weeks until 21 May. This battle honour refers to the general period of 11 to 18 May 1944.
- Paliano: Two companies of the Carbineers were involved in this action along Route 6 during the advance from Cassino to Rome, as German forces fought several rearguard actions.
- Bagno Regio: Bagno Regio was a hilltop village north of Rome, and on the night of 12 – 13 June 1944, elements of the Carbineers scaled a precipitous rock face to effect its capture.
- Città della Pieve: This action occurred during the period 16 – 19 June 1944 on the Allied advance north of Rome. Two companies of the Carbineers lost eight men killed.
- Florence: Following the fall of Rome on 5 June 1944, German resistance stiffened in the vicinity of Florence, and during June there were several sharp actions, such as those at Bagno Regio and Chiusi. The battle honour covers the period from 17 July to 10 August. This activity was followed by a period of rest during August.
- The Greve: The action at the Greve, a river north of Rome, was fought over the period 24 July to 2 August.
- Gothic Line was another of the German defensive lines that straddled the boot of Italy as the Allied armies pushed northwards from Rome in mid-to late-1944. The Gothic Line Carbineer battles fought in the effort to breach it, and thereafter, have entered the Regiment's hall-of-fame: Monte Vigese, Monte Stanco, Monte Pezza and others.
- Monte Vigese: Monte Vigese was a seemingly impregnable rocky eminence occupied by entrenched German forces. On 6 October, however, in driving rain and poor visibility, 'A' Company, under Major Peter Francis, performed the virtually impossible and drove the defenders off.
- Monte Stanco: On 10 October, at Monte Stanco, the Carbineers suffered one of their few reverses of the Italian campaign, when they were compelled to abandon this hard-won feature. Captain Jacko Edmonds earned the American Silver Star for gallantry for his part in this action.
- Monte Pezza: Monte Pezza was the next peak in the Gothic Line to be tackled by the 1st Royal Natal Carbineers, on 17 October.
- Po Valley: Following a long and hard winter in the snow-bound Apennine Mountains, the campaign to drive the Germans out of the rest of Italy, the fighting entered the Po Valley, and the Carbineers once again played a significant part in operations from 19 to 30 April 1945.

=== South-West Africa/Angola 1976–1989 ===
The Natal Carbineers saw service in a counter-insurgency capacity in northern Namibia (South-West Africa) for three months from August 1976, and thereafter in numerous modular deployments over the next decade.

=== Battle honours list ===
Battle Honours - Displayed on the Regimental Colour
Awarded to the Natal Carbineers
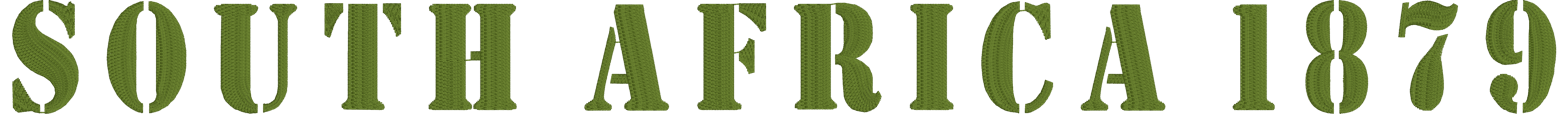
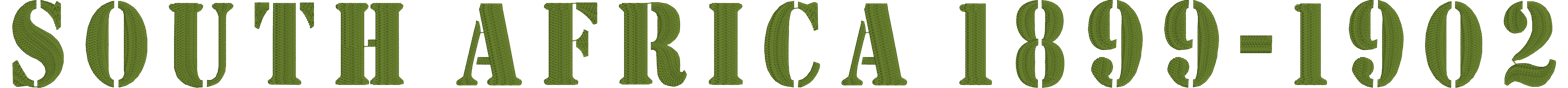
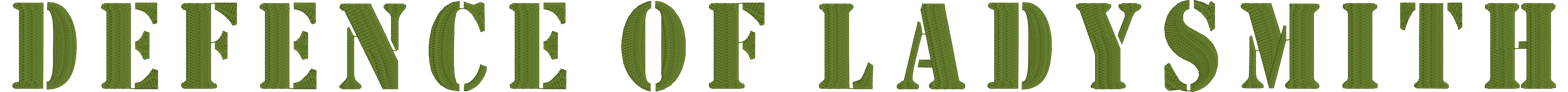
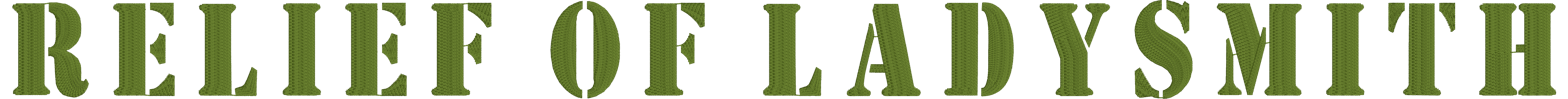
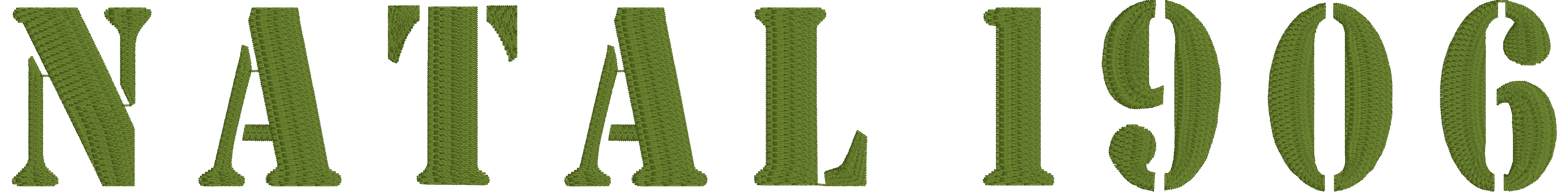
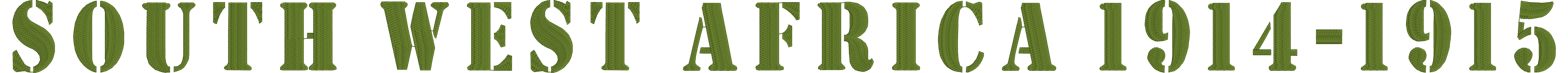
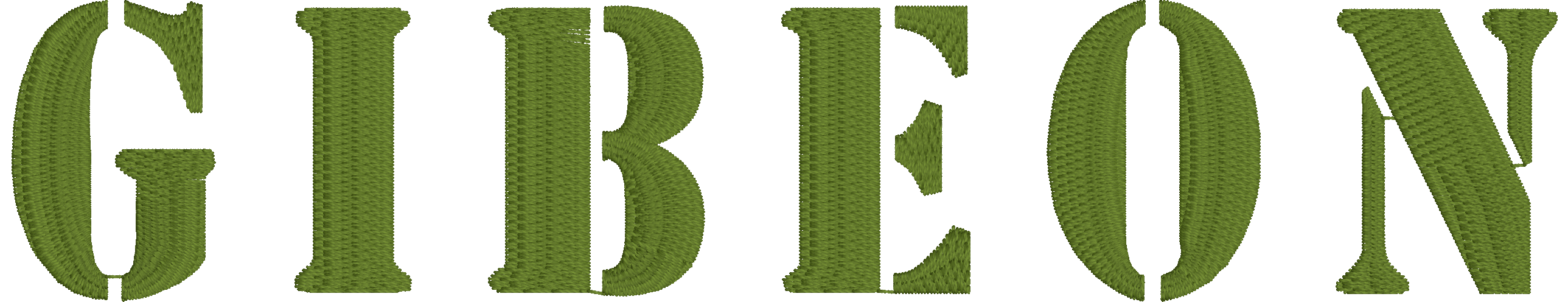
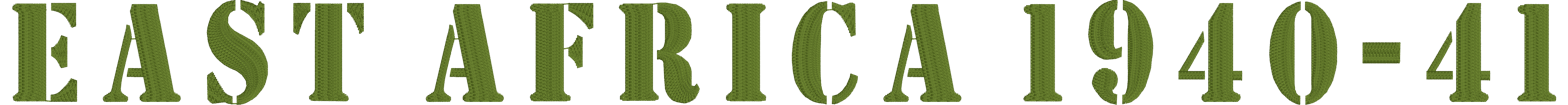
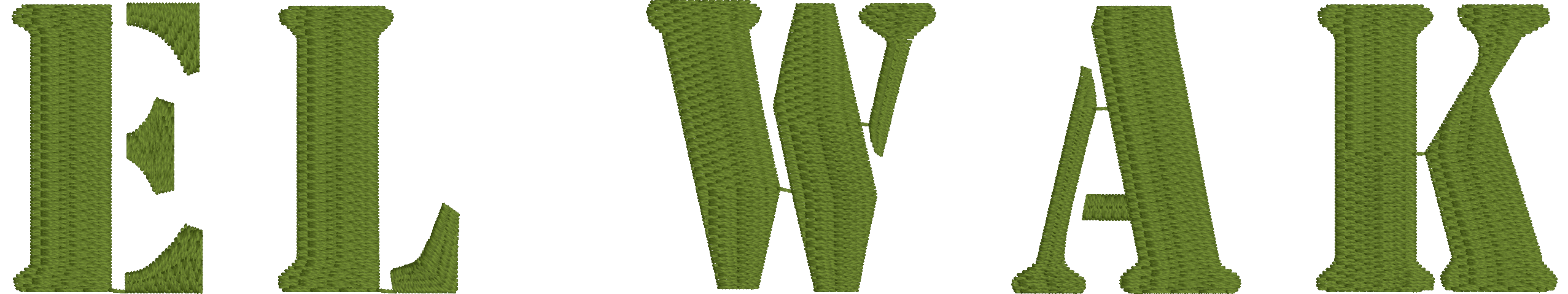
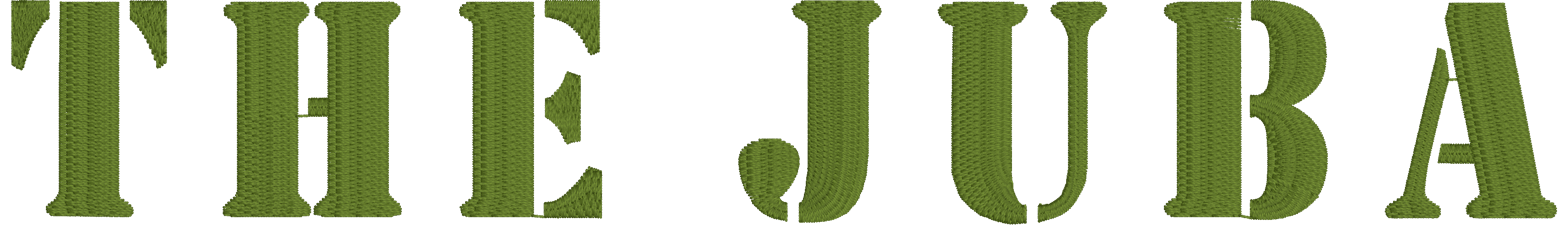
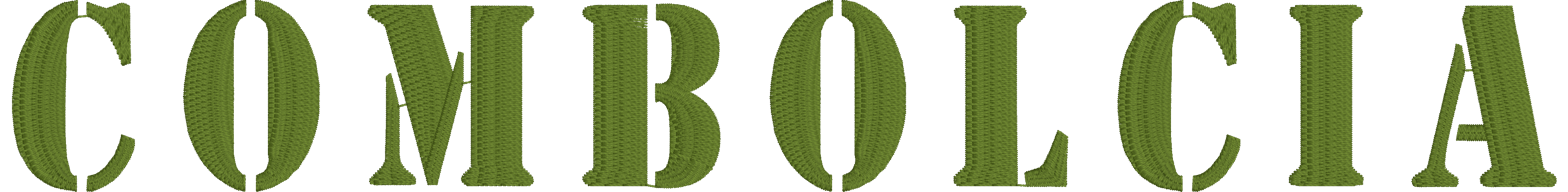
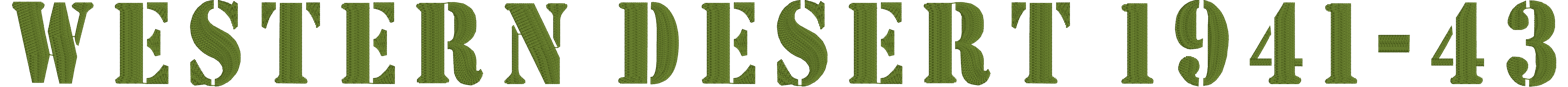
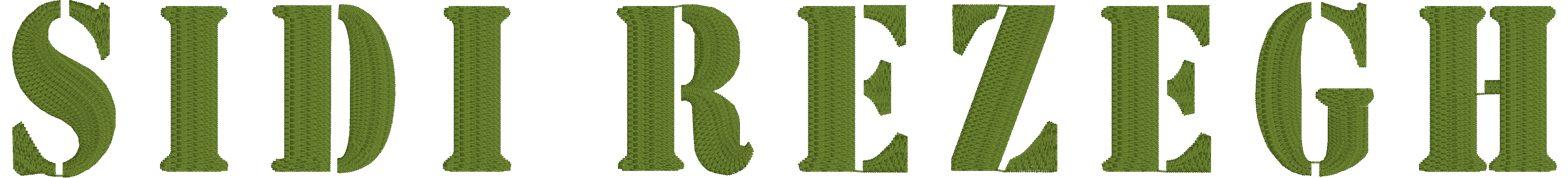
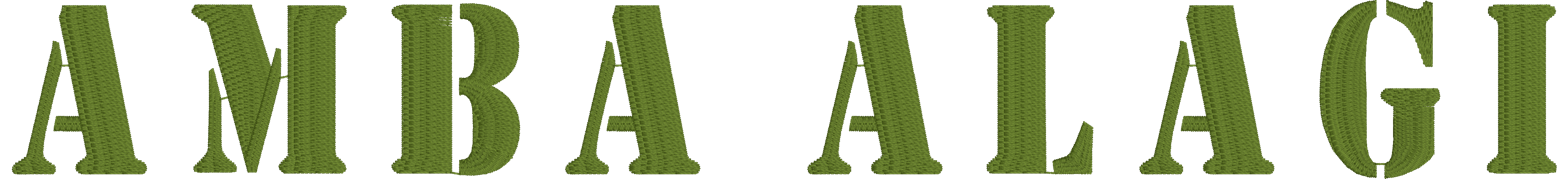
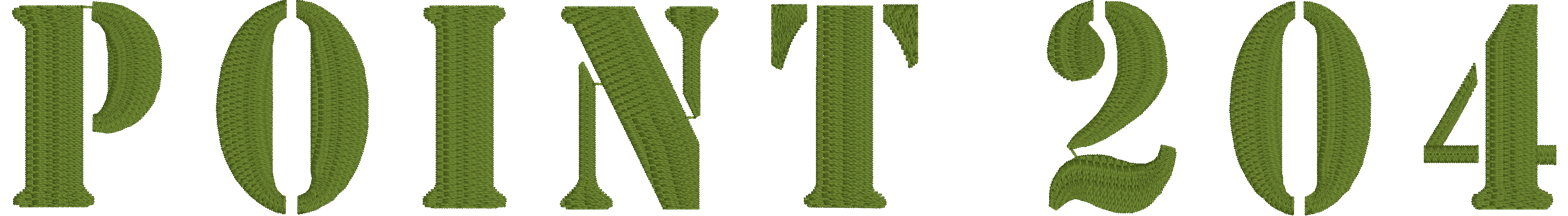
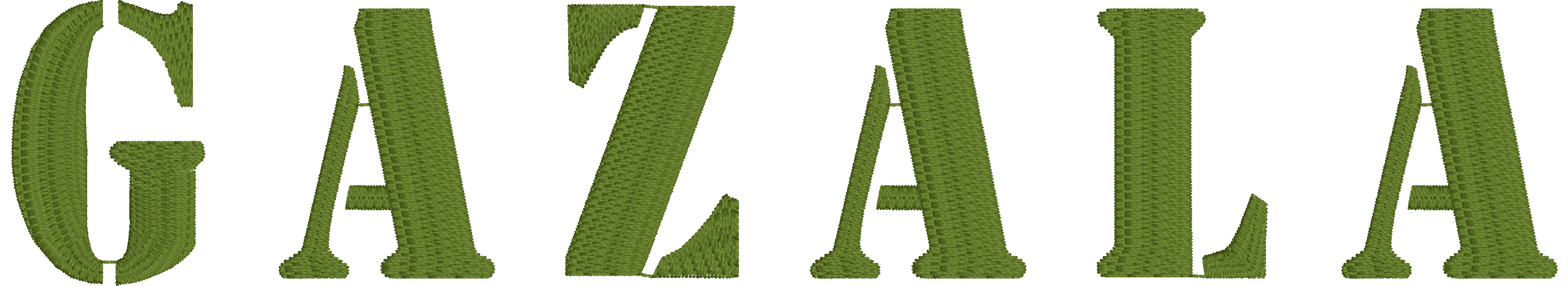
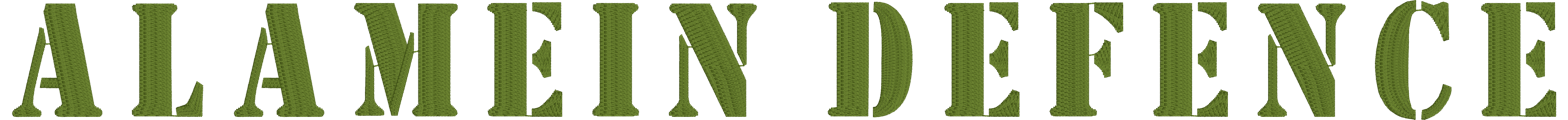
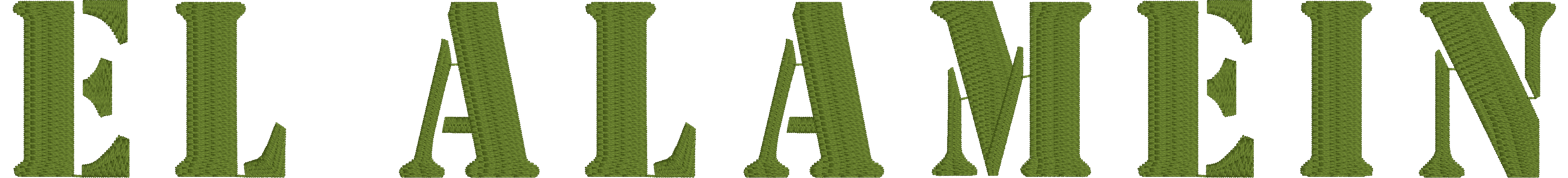
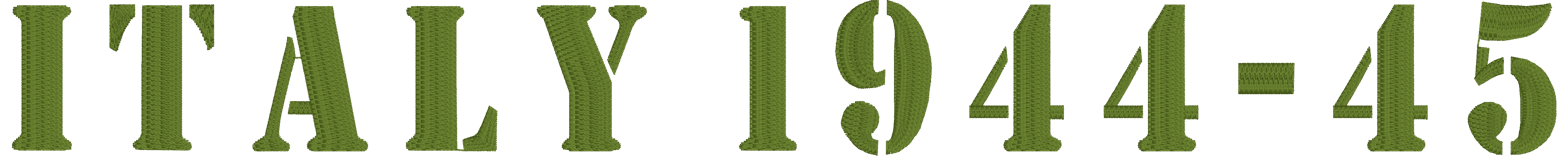
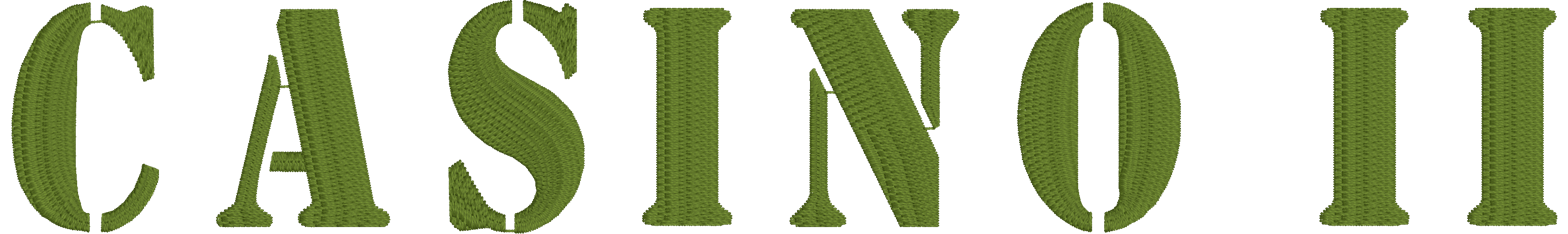
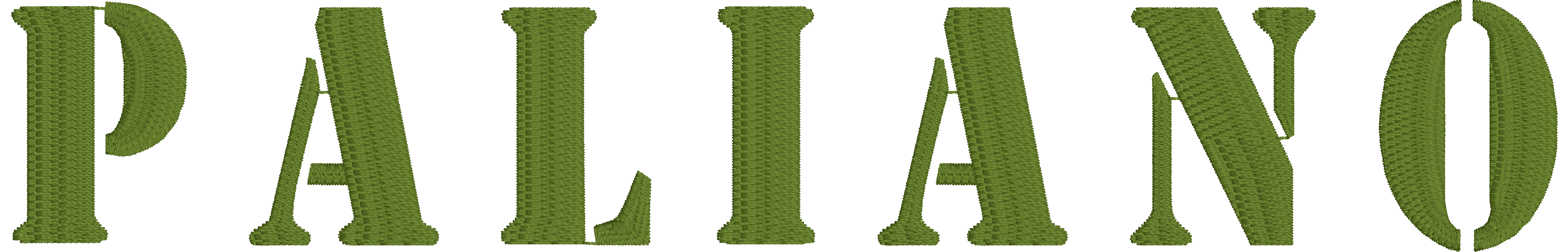
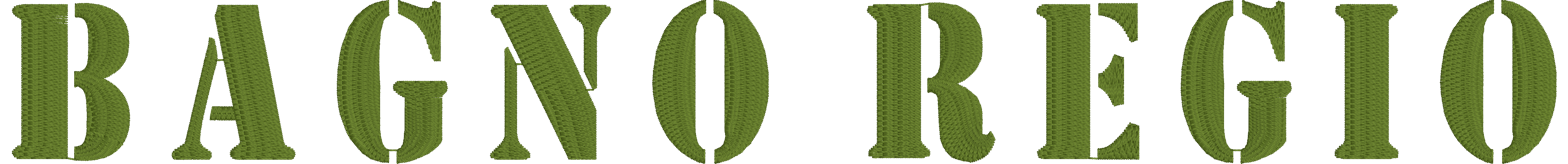
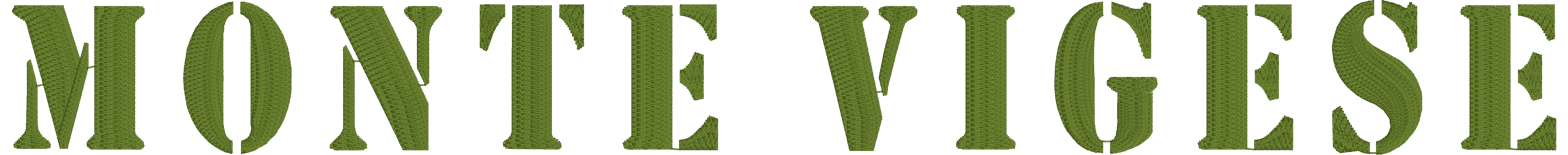
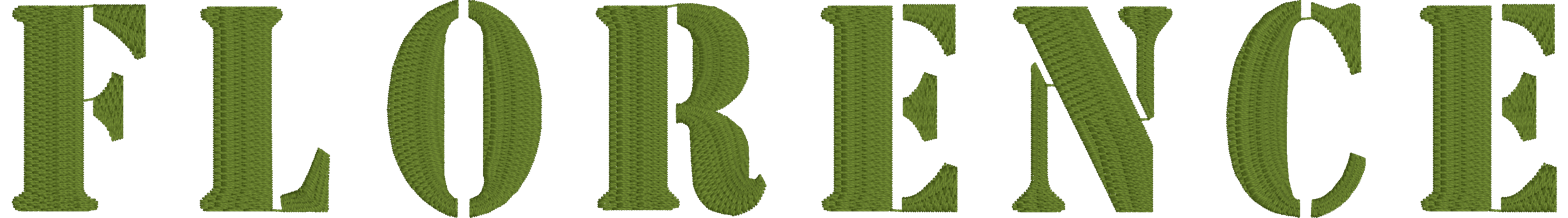
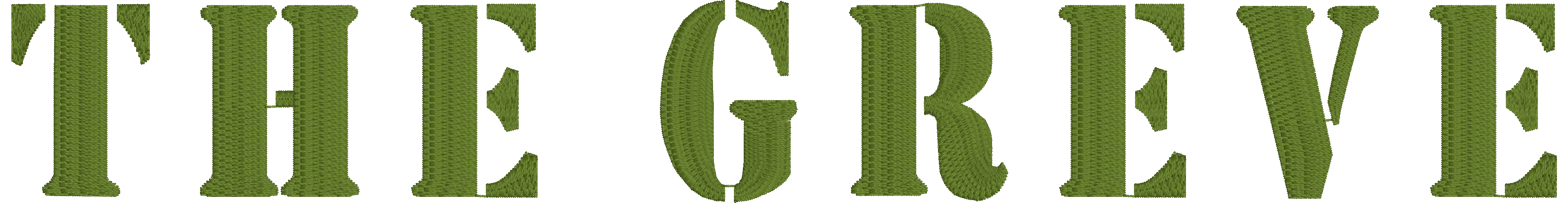
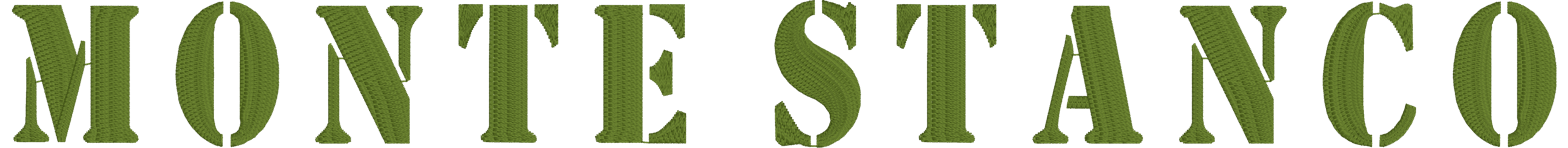
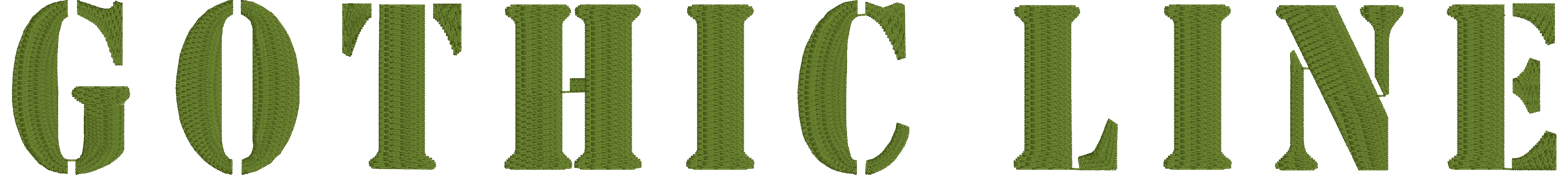
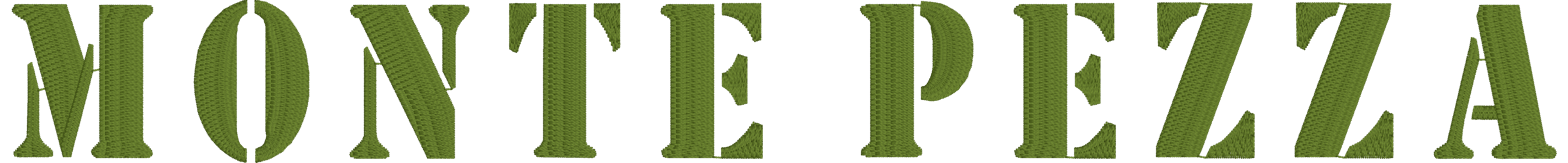
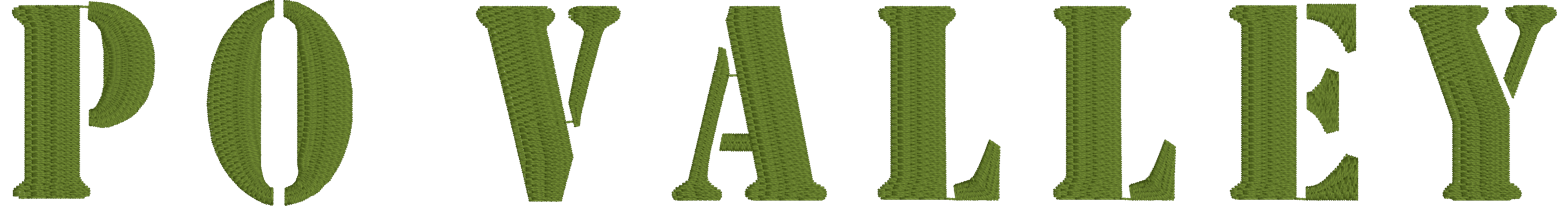
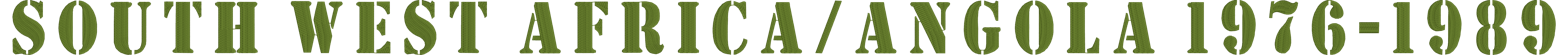

== Insignia ==
=== Previous Dress Insignia ===
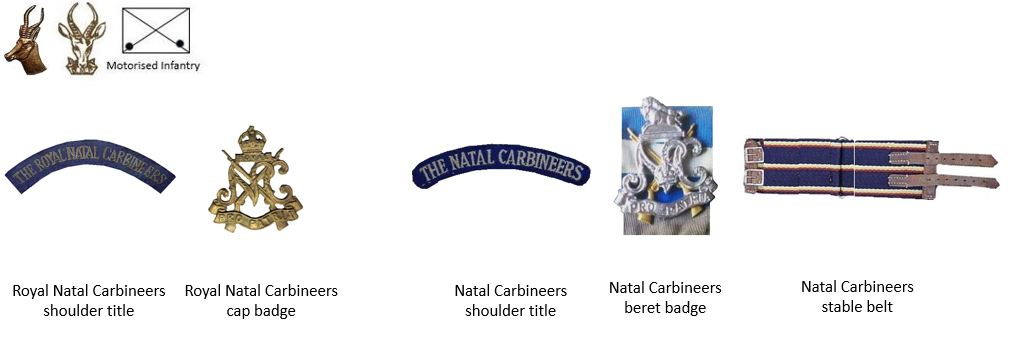
UDF and SADF era Natal Carbineers insignia

Helmet Flash - Royal Natal Carbineers (RNC) - 1923 - 1942

=== Current Dress Insignia ===
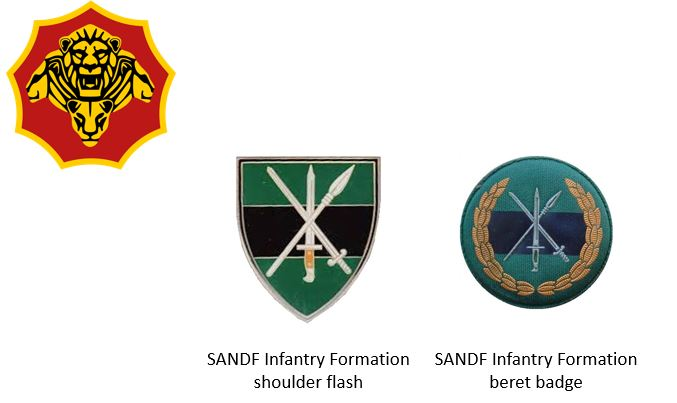
SANDF era Infantry Formation insignia

== Leadership ==
Natal Carbineers Leadership
From	Honorary Colonels	To	Ribbon
July 1906	Field Marshal His Excellency The Right Honourable; Horatio Herbert Kitchener, 1st Earl Kitchener KG,GCB,OM,GCMG (Note: Later Secretary of State for War)	June 1916	Order of the Garter KG Order of the Bath GCB Order of Merit OM Order of St Michael and St George GCMG
January 1920	Col Duncan Mc Kenzie Legion d' Honneur CB,CMG,VD (Note: Later Brigadier General)	April 1932	Order of the Bath CB Order of St Michael and St George CMG Colonial Auxiliary Forces Officers' Decoration VD
June 1925	Maj Gen Sir Nevill Maskelyne Smyth VC,KCB	April 1926	Victoria Cross VC Order of the Bath KCB
July 1932	Col David Watt Mackay CMG,VD	November 1942	Order of St Michael and St George CMG Colonial Auxiliary Forces Officers' Decoration VD
1943	Lt Col onel George Robert Richards	1951	
February 1953	Lt Col John Willoughby Verner Montgomery CMG,DSO,VD	April 1968	Order of St Michael and St George CMG Distinguished Service Order DSO Colonial Auxiliary Forces Officers' Decoration VD
February 1969	Lt Col Peter Clement Austin Francis MC,ED	May 2009	Military Cross MC Efficiency Decoration (South Africa) ED
From	Commanding Officers	To	Ribbon
January 1855	Lt Col Sir Theophilus St George	July 1857	
July 1857	Lt Col Hon. W.C. Sargeaunt	1857	
1858	Lt Col P Allen	1862	
1862	Lt Col the Hon. D. Erskine	1871	
1871	Capt Theophilus Shepstone jnr CMG	August 1881	Order of St Michael and St George CMG
April 1882	Lt Col W. Royston	August 1889	
1889	Lt Col E.M. Greene and Maj T. Menne	1890	
March 1891	Lt Col E. M. Greene CMG,VD	April 1903	Order of St Michael and St George CMG Colonial Auxiliary Forces Officers' Decoration VD
May 1903	Lt Col Duncan Mc Kenzie CB,CMG,VD (Note: Later Honorary Colonel)	February 1907	Order of the Bath CB Order of St Michael and St George CMG Colonial Auxiliary Forces Officers' Decoration VD
February 1907	Col J. Weighton VD	February 1911	Colonial Auxiliary Forces Officers' Decoration VD
March 1911	Col D.W. Mc Kay CMG,VD	September 1920	Order of St Michael and St George CMG Colonial Auxiliary Forces Officers' Decoration VD
September 1920	Lt Col R.M. Tanner DSO,VD	June 1925	Distinguished Service Order DSO Colonial Auxiliary Forces Officers' Decoration VD
July 1925	Lt Col R.A. Lindsay VD	June 1929	Colonial Auxiliary Forces Officers' Decoration VD
July 1929	Lt Col A.G. Mc Kenzie MC,VD	September 1936	Military Cross MC Colonial Auxiliary Forces Officers' Decoration VD
September 1936	Lt Col L.N. Hay MC,VD	August 1940	Military Cross MC Colonial Auxiliary Forces Officers' Decoration VD
August 1940	Lt Col J.G. Mc Menamin	April 1941	
May 1941	Lt Col P. M. G. le Roux DSO,VD	March 1942	Distinguished Service Order DSO Colonial Auxiliary Forces Officers' Decoration VD
March 1942	Lt Col M. C. Comrie	October 1944	
October 1944	Lt Col P.C.A. Francis MC,ED	February 1955	Military Cross MC Efficiency Decoration (South Africa) ED
March 1955	Comdt J.P. Edmonds JCD	January 1961	John Chard Decoration JCD Silver Star Medal
January 1961	Comdt G.R. De Carle JCD,MC,MM	July 1966	John Chard Decoration JCD Military Cross MC Military Medal MM
August 1966	Comdt L.R. Foster JCD	June 1968	John Chard Decoration JCD
June 1968	Comdt W.E.G. Taylor JCD	December 1971	John Chard Decoration JCD
December 1971	Comdt N.R. Pinnell JCD	March 1975	John Chard Decoration JCD
March 1975	Comdt E.G. Witherspoon JCD	June 1981	John Chard Decoration JCD
June 1981	Comdt H.D.M. Witherspoon JCD	April 1985	John Chard Decoration JCD
April 1985	Comdt Eddie Hall MMM,JCD	July 1990	Military Merit Medal MMM John Chard Decoration JCD
July 1990	Lt Col A.C. Simpson MMM,JCD	December 1995	Military Merit Medal MMM John Chard Decoration JCD
January 1996	Lt Col R. Mottram MMM,JCD	2004	Military Merit Medal MMM John Chard Decoration JCD
2004	Lt Col Ken M. Lowe JCD	nd	John Chard Decoration JCD
nd	Lt Col M. Mhlope	n.d.	
From	Regimental Sergeants Major	To	Ribbon
1855	G.K. Weston	1872	
1872	E.M. Green	nd	
nd	L.R. Foster	1884	
April 1886	W.H.A. Molyneux	1896	
1896	B.M. Bowen	March 1900	
March 1900	WO1 W. Burkimsher DCM	January 1922	Distinguished Conduct Medal DCM
February 1922	WO1 F.P.W. Barden	1927	
1928	WO1 A.C. Adie	1934	
1934	WO1 J.S.F. Nurden	1936	
1936	WO1 E.W. Christie	1937	
1937	WO1 L.R. Foster	1941	
1941	WO1 E.F. Mc Lauchlin	1941	
1942	WO1 K.R. Kabrita	1944	
1944	WO1 W. Allenberg DCM	1944	Distinguished Conduct Medal DCM
1944	WO1 A. Robinson	1945	
June 1946	WO1 T.R. Polson	December 1948	
January 1949	WO1 M.D.L. Johnston SM,PMD,JCD (Note: WO2 Herbie Wilson, A Company Sgt Major, filled in as acting RSM quite often in RSM Johnston's absence)	December 1982	Southern Cross Medal SM Pro Merito Decoration PMD John Chard Decoration JCD
January 1983	WO1 J.M. Schnell MMM,JCD	April 1990	Military Merit Medal MMM John Chard Decoration JCD
May 1990	WO1 E. John Hall MMM,JCD	March 2003	Military Merit Medal MMM John Chard Decoration JCD
March 2003	WO1 N.Cloete MMM,JCD	2009	Military Merit Medal MMM John Chard Decoration JCD
2009	MWO Ben M. Tarr JCD	2018	John Chard Decoration JCD
nd	unknown	Present	

== Alliances ==
- United Kingdom – The Royal Scots Dragoon Guards (Carabiniers and Greys)

== See also ==
- List of South African Battle Honours
