= Gancedo (meteorite) =

Meteorite that fell in Argentina

- Type: Iron
- Composition: 92.6 % Fe, 6.7 % Ni, 0.6 % Co, 0.1 % P, Ga, In and Ge
- Country: Argentina
- Region: Gancedo, Chaco
- Observed fall: No
- TKW: 30,800 kg (67,900 lb)

The Gancedo Meteorite is the largest known fragment of the meteor shower that fell in Campo del Cielo, in Charata, Chaco Province, Argentina.

According to early reports, the meteorite weighs approximately 30,800 kilograms (34.0 short tons), making it the largest meteorite found in the Americas and the third-largest in the world. Before 2016, El Chaco, also part of the Campo del Cielo meteorite fall, was estimated to be the largest fragment of this meteor shower. Its weight was estimated at 37,000 kilograms (41 short tons) but was re-estimated at 28,840 kilograms (31.79 short tons) in 2016.

It makes Gancedo the third-largest worldwide, while Anighito, part of the massive Cape York meteorite fall found in Greenland, weighs 30,875 kilograms (34.034 short tons). The largest single-piece find remains the Hoba meteorite, which was estimated at 60,000 kilograms (66 short tons).

== Discovery ==
The Gancedo meteorite was discovered underground on September 10, 2016 by a team of explorers from the Astronomy Association of the Chaco (Asociación de Astronomía del Chaco). The discovery site is several kilometers south of the town of Gancedo, in the southwest of Chaco province.

The discovery was made in the area known as Campo del Cielo ("The Sky-Field" or "Field of Heaven"), where approximately 4,500 years ago a shower of metallic meteorites originating from a single parent body fell to earth.

During the extraction of the meteorite, the presence of subsurface water put the meteorite in danger. The nearby town of Gancedo provided machinery that made the extraction possible, and for this reason the team making the extraction decided to name the meteorite after the town of Gancedo.

This is the first discovery on such a scale to be carried out through studies conducted by a local team from the Chaco province. With this discovery, the Chaco region is the source of the third and fourth largest meteorites found to date. The most massive single-piece meteorite found to date is the Hoba meteorite, which was found in 1920 under a farmer's field in Namibia and weighs over 66 tons.
