= Marsden, Saskatchewan =

Village in Saskatchewan, Canada

Marsden
- Village
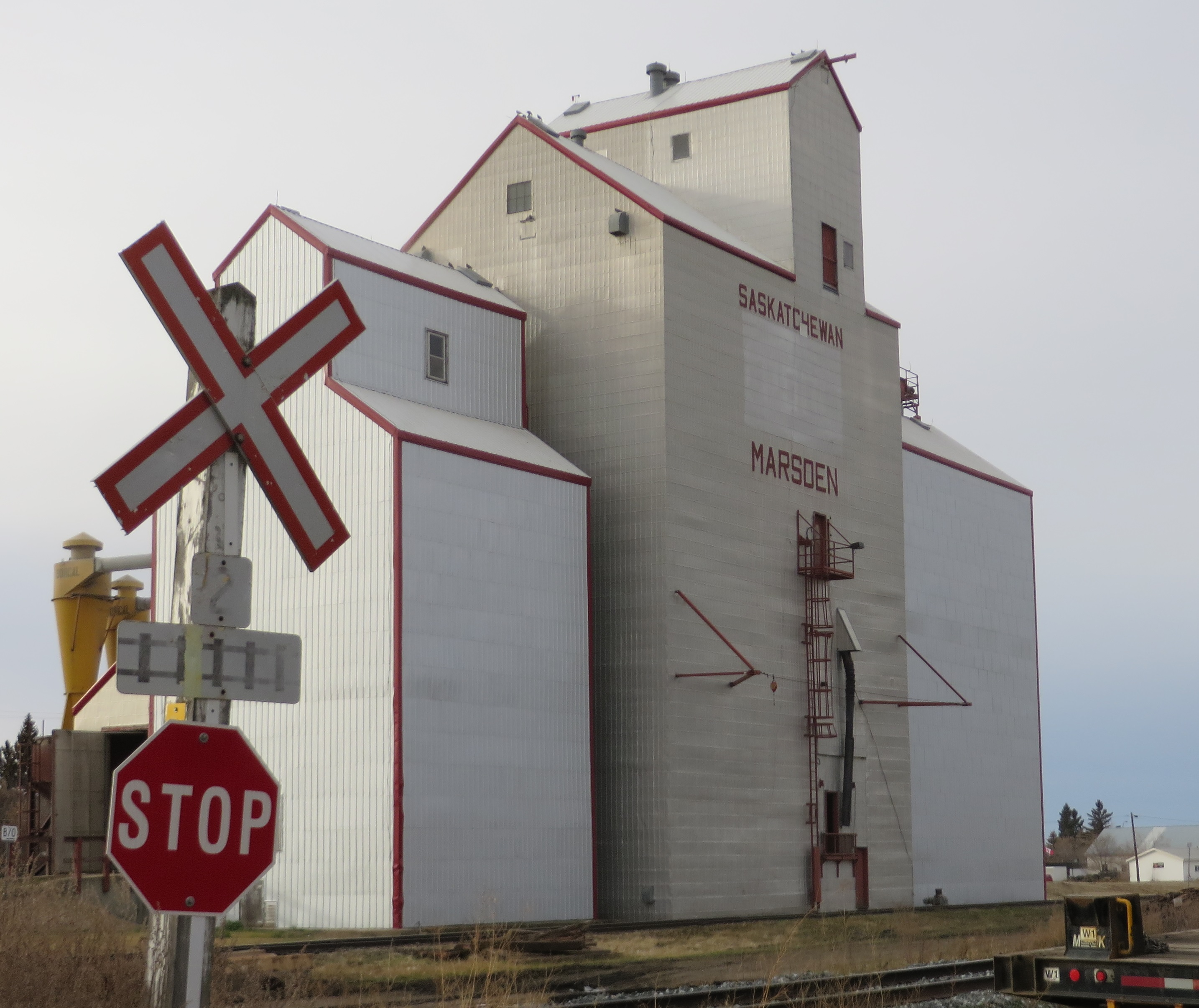
- Marsden elevator row

- Location of Marsden in Saskatchewan Marsden (Canada)
- Coordinates: 52°50′29″N 109°49′26″W
- Country: Canada
- Province: Saskatchewan
- Census division: 13
- Rural municipalities: Manitou Lake No. 442
- Post office Founded: N/A
- Incorporated (Village): N/A
- Incorporated (Town): N/A

Government
  - Administrator: Colleen Digness

Area
  - Total: 0.94 km^{2} (0.36 sq mi)

Population (2006)
  - Total: 234
  - Density: 294.1/km^{2} (762/sq mi)
- Time zone: UTC−7 (MST)
  - Summer (DST): UTC−6 (MDT)
- Postal code: S0M 1P0
- Area code: 306
- Highways: Highway 40

Marsden (2016 population: 297) is a village in the Canadian province of Saskatchewan within the Rural Municipality of Manitou Lake No. 442 and Census Division No. 13. It gained notoriety shortly after the impact of the Buzzard Coulee meteorite near the village on 20 November 2008.

Marsden is located along Highway 40, just east of Wells Lake, and about 4 miles north-west of Manitou Lake.

== History ==
Marsden incorporated as a village on 24 April 1931. The village was named after Marsden, West Yorkshire in England. That was the birthplace of the wife of Alex F. Wright, the first postmaster.

== Demographics ==
Population history (1981–2016)
Year	Pop.	±%
1981	229	—
1986	266	+16.2%
1991	242	−9.0%
1996	263	+8.7%
2001	276	+4.9%
2006	234	−15.2%
2011	284	+21.4%
2016	297	+4.6%
Source: Statistics Canada via Saskatchewan Bureau of Statistics

In the 2021 Census of Population conducted by Statistics Canada, Marsden had a population of 281 living in 111 of its 121 total private dwellings, a change of −5.4% from its 2016 population of 297. With a land area of 0.79 km^{2} (0.31 sq mi), it had a population density of 355.7/km^{2} (921.2/sq mi) in 2021.

In the 2016 Census of Population, the Village of Marsden recorded a population of 297 living in 126 of its 132 total private dwellings, a 4.4% change from its 2011 population of 284. With a land area of 0.94 km^{2} (0.36 sq mi), it had a population density of 316.0/km^{2} (818.3/sq mi) in 2016.

== Parks and recreation ==
About four miles south-east of Marsden is Big Manitou Regional Park, which is on Manitou Lake. The park offers camping, golfing, ball diamonds, and other activities.

== Arts and culture ==
Marsden is the host of the annual Quad War, a Society for Creative Anachronism event. It is a Renaissance / Middle Ages full costume festival and war. It attracts approximately 500 people, mostly society members from Alberta and Saskatchewan. It is usually held in the first week of August.

== Notable people ==
- Bruce Gordon

== See also ==
- List of communities in Saskatchewan
- List of villages in Saskatchewan
