= Campo del Cielo =

Meteorites discovered in Argentina

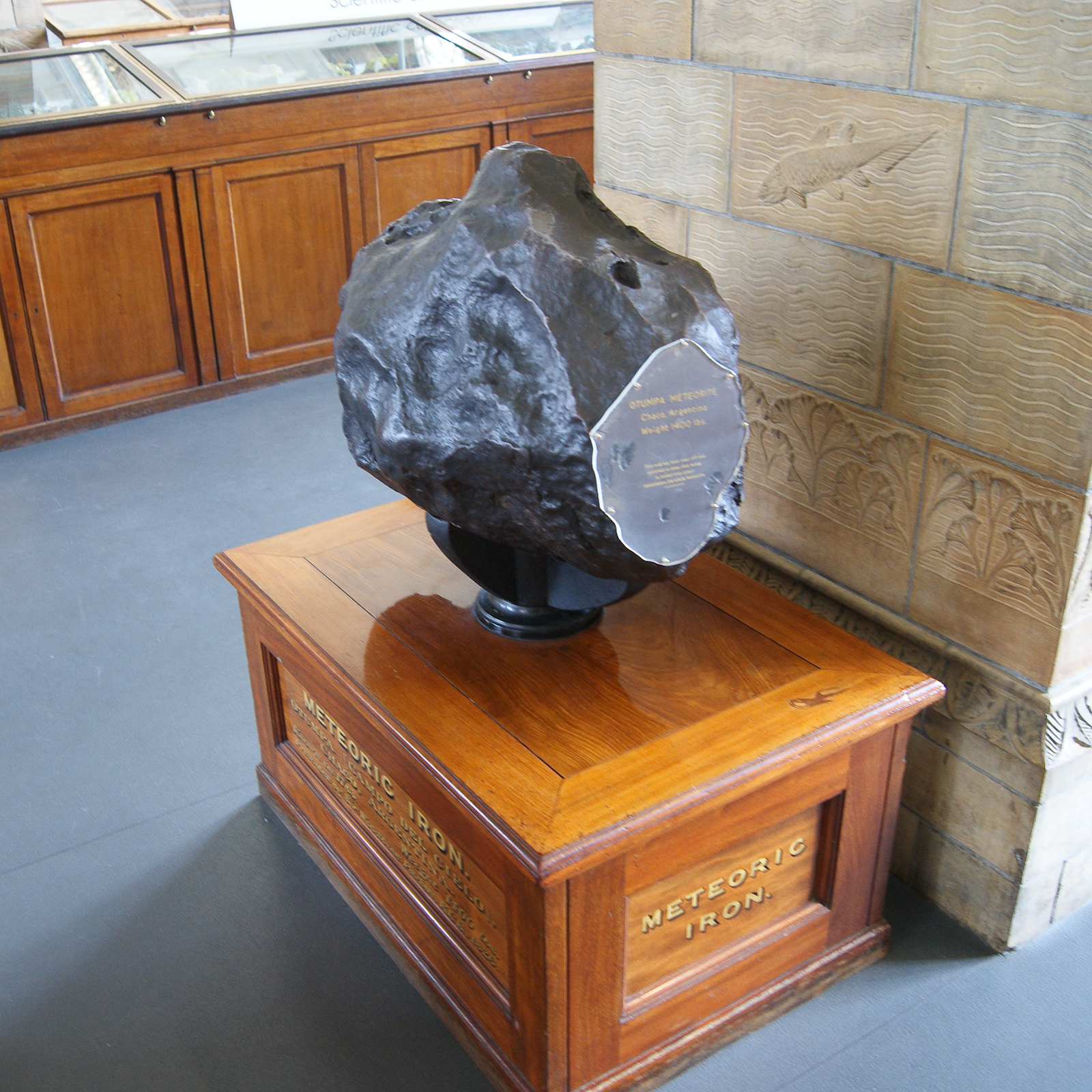
- Otumpa mass, Natural History Museum, London

- Location within Chaco Province
- Location: Chaco, Santiago del Estero, Argentina; 27°38′S 61°42′W

Impact crater structure
- Diameter: 115 m × 91 m (377 ft × 299 ft) (largest)
- Age: 4200 to 4700 years ago Holocene
- Exposed: Yes
- Drilled: Yes
- Bolide type: Coarse octahedrite to granular hexahedrite

Campo del Cielo ("Field of Heaven" or "Field of the Sky" in English) refers to a group of iron meteorites and the area in Argentina where they were found. The site straddles the provinces of Chaco and Santiago del Estero, located 1,000 kilometers (620 mi) north-northwest of Buenos Aires, Argentina and approximately 500 kilometres (310 mi) southwest of Asunción, Paraguay. The crater field covers 18.5 by 3 kilometres (11.5 by 1.9 mi) and contains at least 26 craters, the largest being 115 by 91 metres (377 by 299 ft).

The craters are estimated to be four to five thousand years old. They were reported to the general public in 1576, but were already well-known by aboriginal peoples. The craters and surrounding areas contain many fragments of an iron meteorite. In total, approximately 100 tonnes of fragments have been recovered, the most of any meteorite finding.

The two largest fragments, the 30.8-tonne Gancedo and 28.8-tonne El Chaco, are among the heaviest single-piece meteorite masses recovered on Earth, following the 60-tonne Hoba meteorite and a 31-tonne fragment of the Cape York meteorite.

== History ==
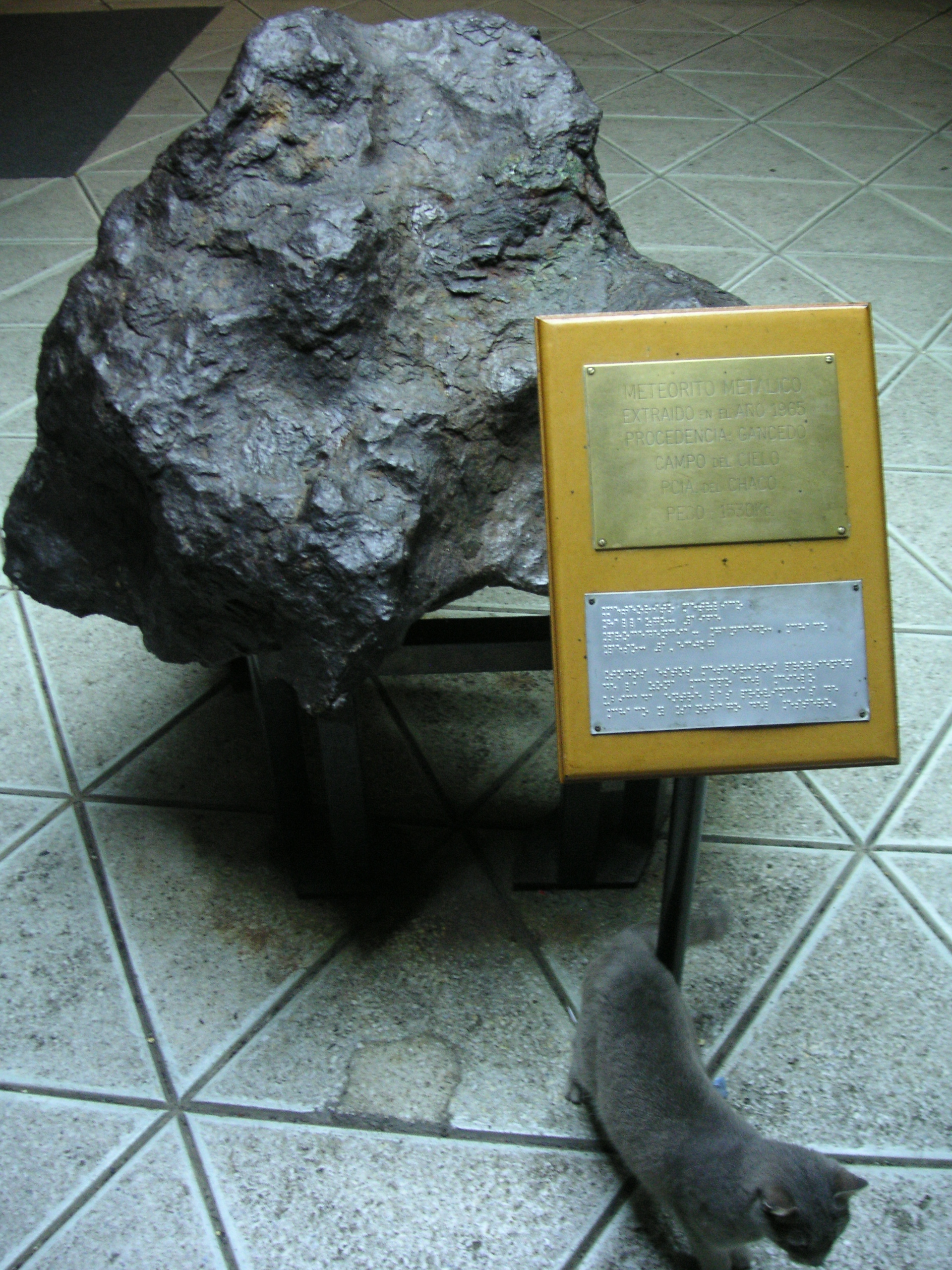
La Perdida, 1,530 kilograms (3,370 lb)

Campo del Cielo
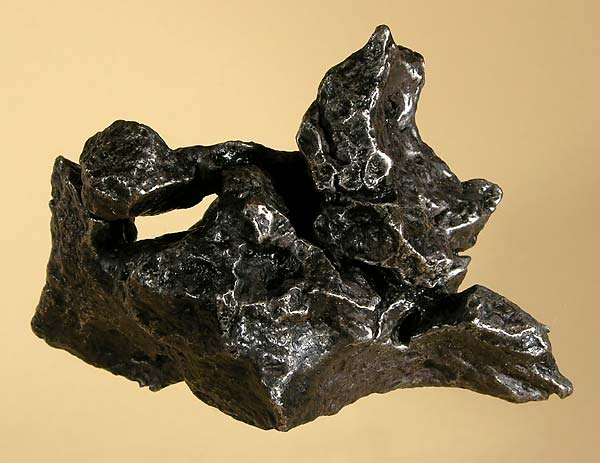
- Campo del Cielo iron meteorite with natural hole, 576 grams
- Type: Iron
- Structural classification: Octahedrite
- Group: IAB
- Composition: 92.9% Fe, 6.7% Ni, 0.4% Co
- Country: Argentina
- Region: Chaco Province and Santiago del Estero Province
- Coordinates: 27°38′S 61°42′W
- Observed fall: No
- Fall date: 4,000–5,000 years ago
- Found date: <1576
- TKW: >100 tonnes
- Strewn field: Yes
- Related media on Wikimedia Commons

In 1576, the governor of a province in northern Argentina commissioned the military to search for a huge mass of iron, which he had heard that natives used for their weapons. The natives claimed that the mass had fallen from the sky in a place they called Piguem Nonralta, which the Spanish translated as Campo del Cielo ("Field of heaven (or the sky)"). The expedition found a large mass of metal protruding out of the soil and collected a few samples, which were described as being of unusual purity. The governor documented the expedition and submitted the report to the General Archive of the Indies in Seville, Spain, but it was quickly forgotten and later reports merely repeated the native legends.

Following the legends, in 1774 Don Bartolomé Francisco de Maguna rediscovered the iron mass which he called el Mesón de Fierro ("the Table of Iron"). Maguna believed that the mass was the tip of an iron vein. The next expedition, led by Rubin de Celis in 1783, used explosives to clear the ground around the mass and found that it was likely a single stone. Celis estimated its mass as 15 tonnes and abandoned it as worthless. He believed that it had formed by a volcanic eruption, rather than being a meteorite. However, he sent samples to the Royal Society in London and published his report in the Philosophical Transactions of the Royal Society. Those samples were later analyzed and found to contain 90% iron and 10% nickel; they were assigned to a meteoritic origin.

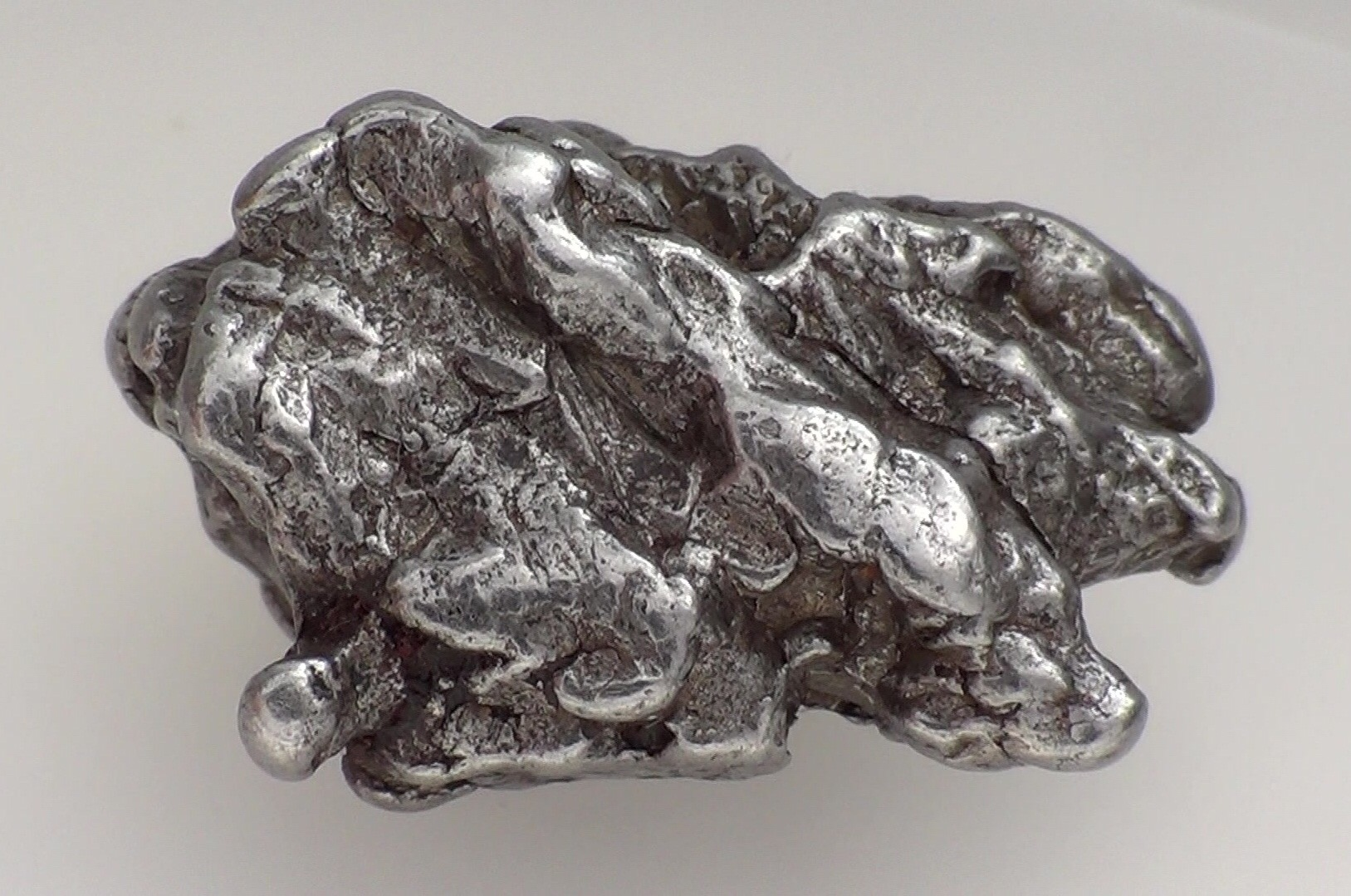
A 17-g specimen

Since the crater field's discovery, hundreds of iron pieces have been recovered, weighing from a few milligrams to 34 tonnes. Otumpa, a mass of approximately 1 tonne, was discovered in 1803. A 634-kilogram (1,398 lb) portion of this mass was taken to Buenos Aires in 1813, then donated to the British Museum. Other large fragments are summarized in the table below. The mass called El Taco was originally 3,090 kilograms (6,810 lb), but the largest remaining fragment weighs 1,998 kilograms (4,405 lb).

In 1969 El Chaco (the second-largest mass at 28,840 kilograms (63,580 lb)) was discovered 5 metres (16 ft) below the surface using a metal detector. It was extracted in 1980 and, at the time, was estimated to weigh about 37 tonnes. This made it the second heaviest meteorite after the 60-tonne Hoba meteorite, discovered in Namibia. Currently, more than 100 tonnes of Campo del Cielo fragments have been discovered, making it the heaviest set of such finds on Earth.

In 1990 an Argentine highway police officer foiled a plot by Robert Haag to steal El Chaco. It was returned to Campo del Cielo and is now protected by provincial law.

In 2015, police arrested four alleged smugglers trying to steal more than 907 kilograms (2,000 lb) of protected meteorites.

In 2016, the largest-known meteorite of the strewn field was unearthed. Named the Gancedo meteorite after the nearby town of Gancedo, which lent equipment to aid in the extraction, this nickel-iron meteorite has a mass of 30,800 kilograms (67,900 lb) (less than the original estimated mass of El Chaco). Due to a suspected lack of precision when El Chaco was weighed in 1980, the latter was reweighed with the same instruments and discovered to only have a mass of 28,840 kilograms (63,580 lb), making Gancedo the largest Campo del Cielo fragment recovered.

== The meteorite impact, age and composition ==
At least 26 craters make up the Campo del Cielo crater field, the largest being 115 by 91 metres (377 by 299 ft). The field covered an area of 3 by 18.5 kilometres (1.9 by 11.5 mi) with an associated strewn area of smaller meteorites including an additional 60 kilometres (37 mi). At least two of the craters contained thousands of small iron pieces. Such an unusual distribution suggests that a large body entered the Earth's atmosphere and broke into pieces, which fell to the ground. The size of the main body is estimated to have been larger than 4 metres (13 ft) in diameter. Samples of charred wood were taken from beneath the meteorite fragments and analyzed for carbon-14 composition. The results indicate the date of the fall to be around 4,200–4,700 years ago, or 2,200–2,700 years BC. The age of the meteorite is estimated to be 4.5 billion years old, formed as part of the development of the Solar System.

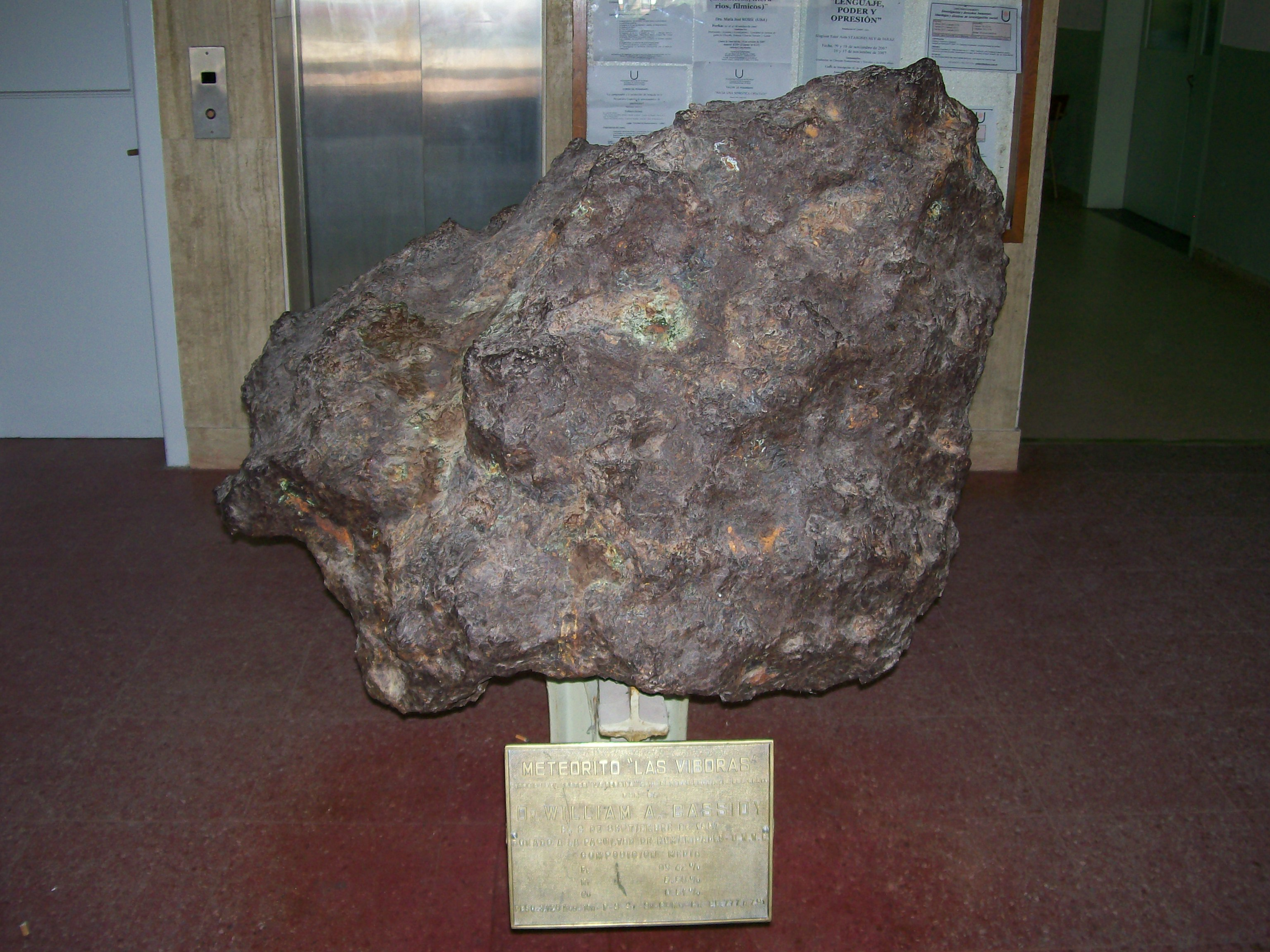
"Las Víboras" fragment, exhibited at the Universidad Nacional del Nordeste (Chaco, Argentina)

The fragments contain an unusually high density of inclusions for an iron meteorite, which may have contributed to the disintegration of the original meteorite. The average composition of the Campo del Cielo meteorites is 3.6 ppm iridium, 87 ppm gallium, 407 ppm germanium, 0.25% phosphorus, 0.43% cobalt, and 6.67% nickel, with the remaining 92.6% being iron.

Major fragments of the Campo del Cielo meteorite
Mass (tonnes)	Name	Year of discovery
>15	el Mesón de Fierro or Otumpa (missing)	1576
>0.8	Runa Pocito or Otumpa	1803
4.21	el Toba	1923
0.02	el Hacha	1924
0.73	el Mocovi	1925
0.85	el Tonocote	1931
0.46	el Abipon	1936
1	el Mataco	1937
2	el Taco	1962
1.53	la Perdida	1967
3.12	las Viboras	1967
28.8	el Chaco	1969 (extracted in 1980)
>10	Tañigó II (missing)	1997
15	la Sorpresa	2005
7.85	el Wichí or Meteorito Santiagueño	2006
30.8	Gancedo	2016

== See also ==
- Glossary of meteoritics
- List of impact craters in South America
- Río Cuarto craters
- List of largest meteorites on Earth
