= Hoba meteorite =

Largest known intact meteorite

Hoba
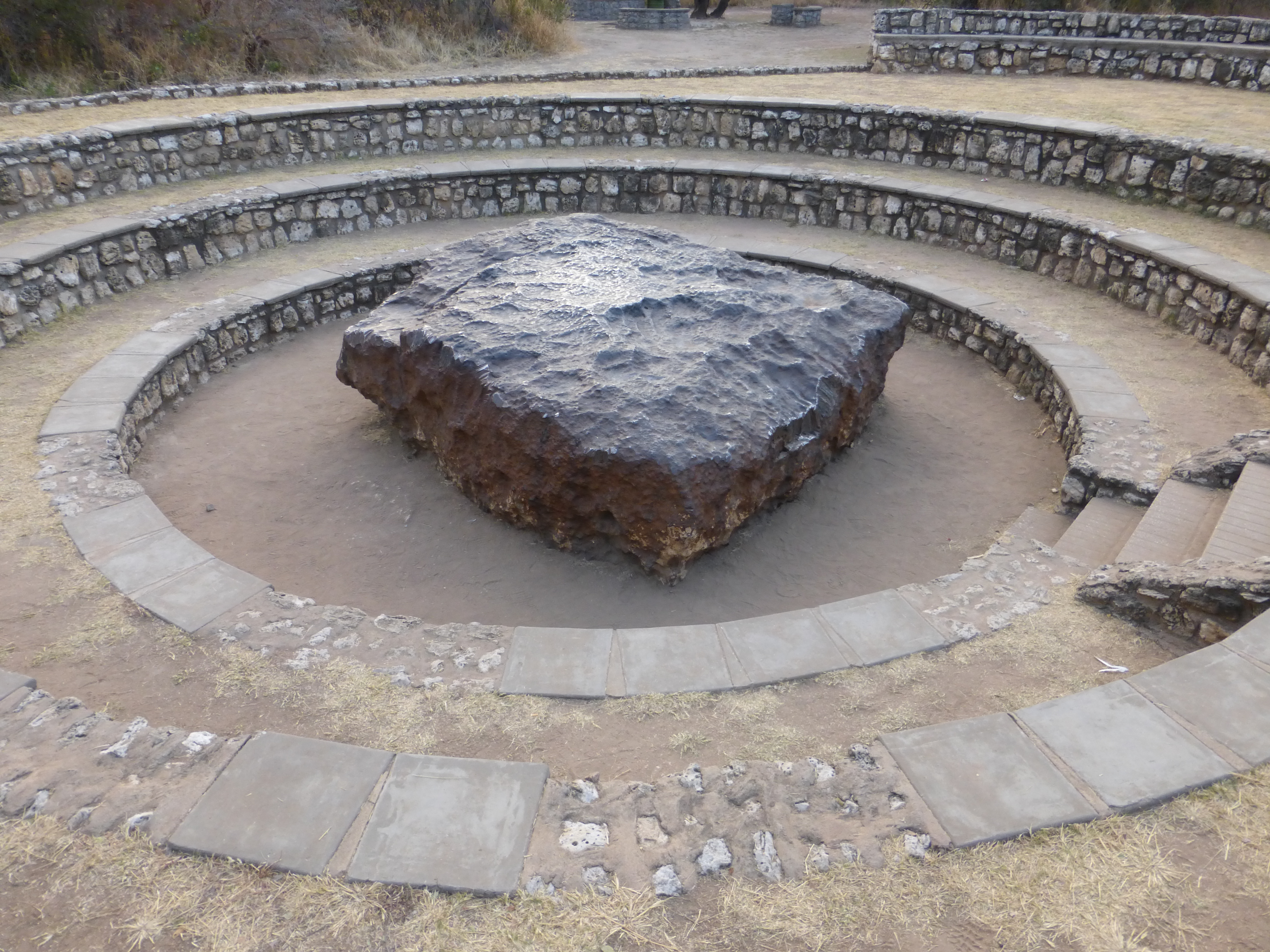
- The meteorite in 2014 after becoming a tourist attraction
- Type: Iron
- Class: 12
- Country: Namibia
- Coordinates: 19°35′33″S 17°56′01″E
- Fall date: Less than 80,000 years ago
- Found date: 1920
- Related media on Wikimedia Commons

The Hoba (/ˈhoʊbə/ HOH-bə) meteorite is named after the farm Hoba West, where it lies, not far from Grootfontein in the Otjozondjupa Region of Namibia. It has been uncovered but because of its large mass, it has never been moved from where it fell. The main mass (some parts have apparently been chopped off) is estimated at more than 60 tonnes. It is the largest known intact meteorite (as a single piece) and about twice as massive as the largest fragment of either the Cape York meteorite's 31-tonne Ahnighito kept in the American Museum of Natural History or the Campo del Cielo's 31-tonne Gancedo. It is also the most massive naturally occurring piece of iron (specifically ferronickel) known on Earth's surface. The name Hoba comes from a Khoekhoegowab word meaning 'gift'. Following its donation to the government in 1987, a visitor centre was constructed with a circular stone access and seating area.

== Impact ==
The Hoba meteorite is thought to have impacted Earth less than 80,000 years ago. It is inferred that the Earth's atmosphere slowed the object in such a way that it impacted the surface at terminal velocity, thereby remaining intact and causing little excavation (expulsion of earth). Assuming a drag coefficient of about 1.3, the meteor appears to have slowed to about 2.75 km/s (6,200 mph) from an entry speed to the atmosphere typically in excess of 10 km/s (22,000 mph). The meteorite is unusual in that it is flat on both major surfaces.

== Discovery ==
Comparison of approximate sizes of notable impactors with the Hoba meteorite, a Boeing 747 and a New Routemaster bus

The Hoba meteorite left no preserved crater and its discovery was a chance event. In 1920, the owner of the land, Jacobus Hermanus Brits, encountered the object while ploughing one of his fields with an ox. While working the field, he heard a loud metallic scratching sound and the plough came to an abrupt halt. The obstruction was excavated, identified as a meteorite and described by Brits, whose report was published in 1920 and can be viewed at the Grootfontein Museum in Namibia.

Friedrich Wilhelm Kegel took the first published photograph of the Hoba meteorite.

== Description and composition ==
Hoba is a tabular body of metal, measuring 2.7 by 2.7 by 0.9 m (8.9 by 8.9 by 3.0 ft). Erosion, scientific sampling and vandalism reduced its bulk over the years. The meteorite is composed of about 84% iron and 16% nickel, with traces of cobalt. It is classified as an ataxite iron meteorite belonging to the nickel-rich chemical class IVB. A crust of iron hydroxides is present on the surface due to weathering oxidation.

== Modern history ==
In an effort to control relocation attempts, with permission from the farm's owner, Ora Scheel, on 15 March 1955, the government of South West Africa (now Namibia) declared the Hoba meteorite to be a national monument. Since 1979 the proclamation has been extended to an area of 425 m^{2} (4,570 sq ft).

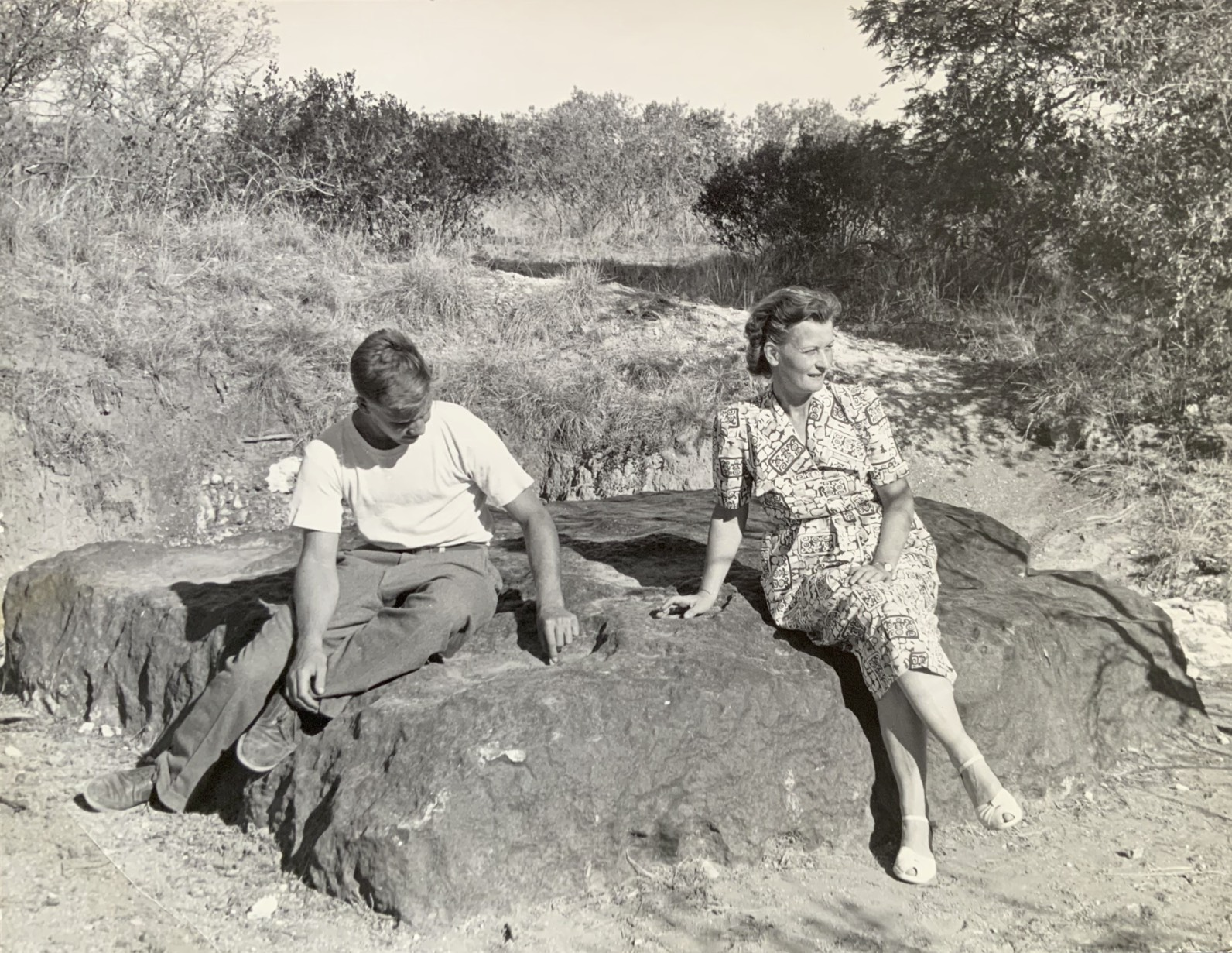
Ora Scheel (right), who acquired the site and secured its designation as a national monument, pictured with a visitor at the Hoba meteorite in 1952.

From about the 1970s, development of the meteorite site for tourism was hampered by its location in the Otavi triangle of Otavi, Tsumeb and Grootfontein, a key arena of the Namibian war of independence or South African Border War.

In 1987, the farm owner donated the meteorite and the site where it lies to the state for educational purposes. Later that year, the government opened a tourist centre at the site. As a result of these developments, vandalism of the Hoba meteorite has ceased and it is now visited by thousands of tourists every year.

Nevertheless, specimens sourced from earlier theft and vandalism continue to be traded. On 7 December 2021, an unusually large 2.8-kilogram (6.2 lb) specimen, illegally removed in 1968, was sold for $59,062 in Los Angeles, US by the auction house Bonhams. The Bonhams sale notice states: "The present specimen was obtained in 1968 by the father of the present owner when he visited the main mass of Hoba together with some friends. Using a hand saw, they cut a large block of the meteorite from the main mass 'as a souvenir', an activity which took them between three and four hours."

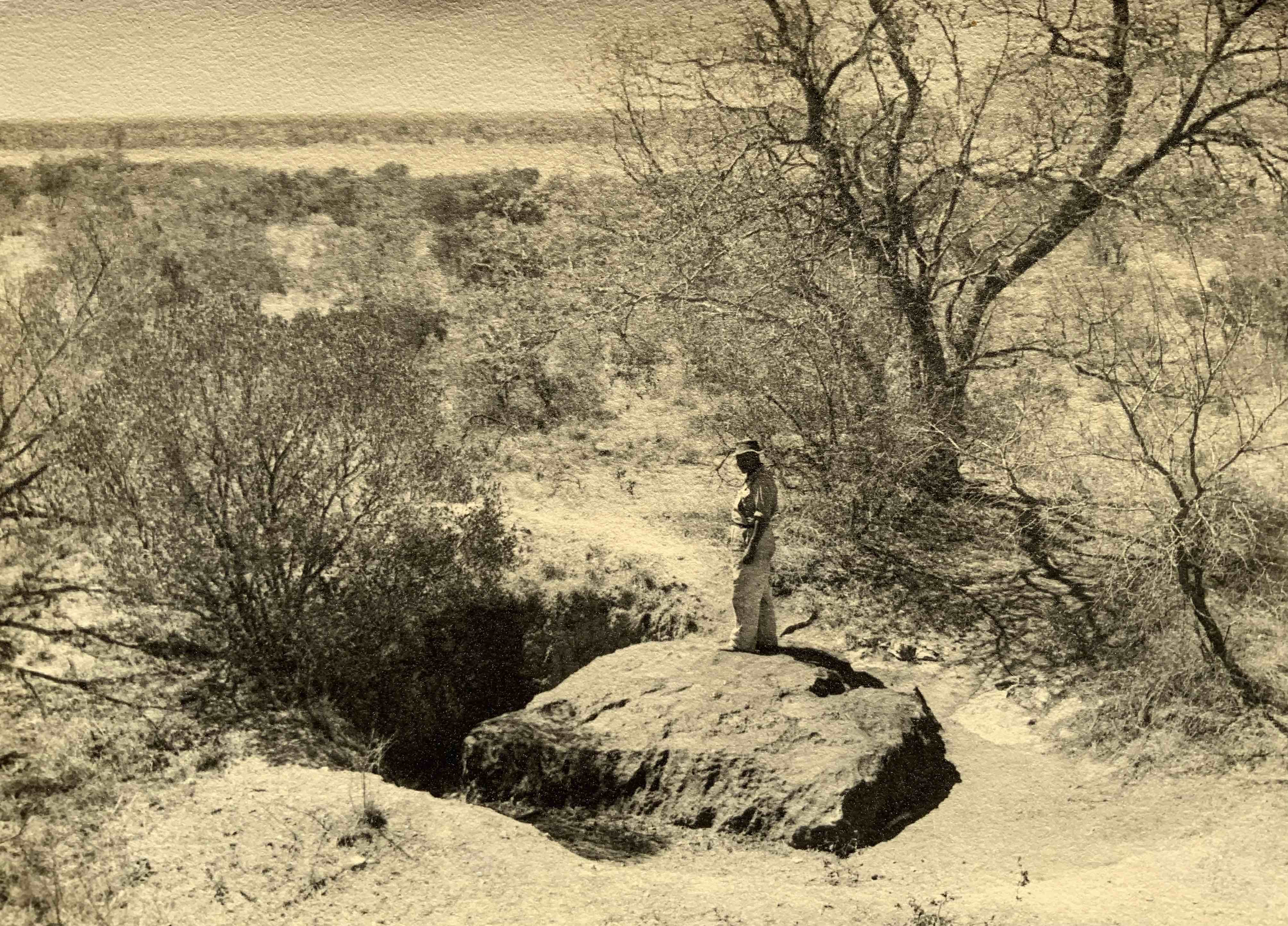
Hoba meteorite in the 1950s, illustrating its remote and unprotected location

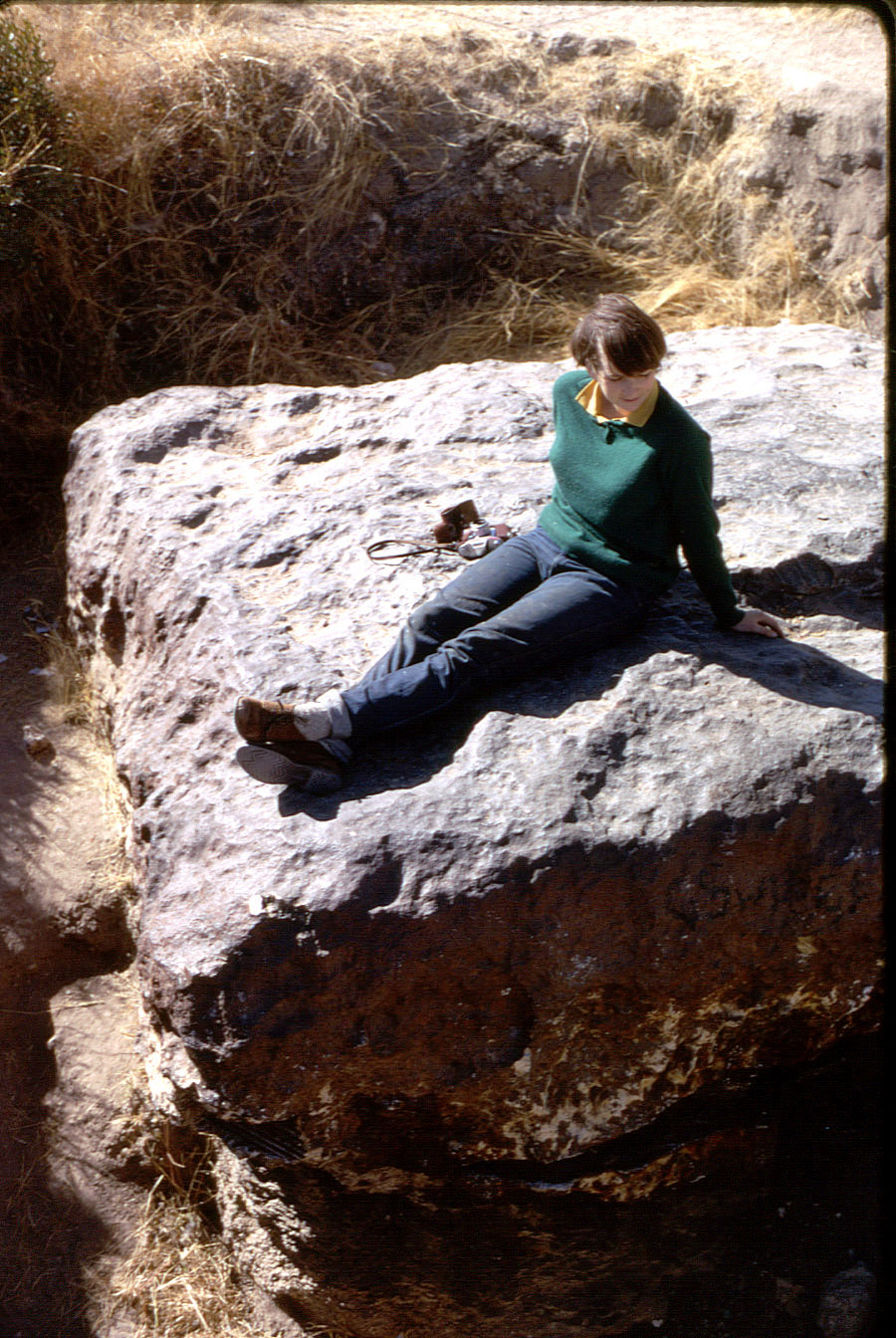
A woman sitting on the meteorite in 1967

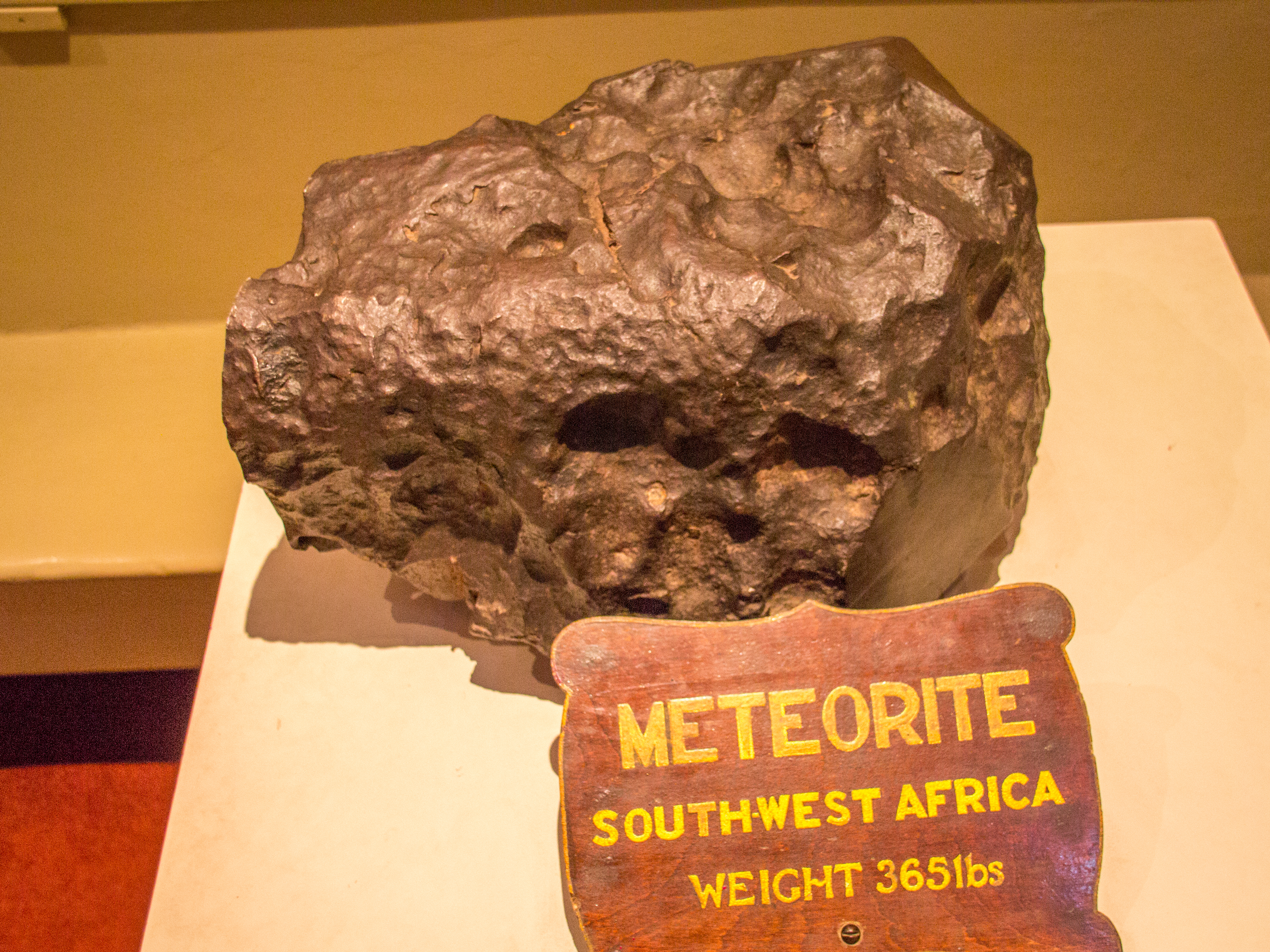
A 166 kg (365 lb) meteorite at the National Trust's Tatton Park, previously incorrectly labelled as Hoba, identified as Gibeon

== See also ==
- Glossary of meteoritics
- List of largest meteorites on Earth
- Gibeon (meteorite)
