= Bruce Gordon (police officer) =

Detective Sergeant (1962–2017)

- Born: November 1, 1962; Marsden, Saskatchewan, Canada
- Died: September 29, 2017 (aged 54); Saskatoon, Saskatchewan, Canada
- Occupation: Detective Sergeant
- Years active: 1984–2012
- Spouse: Chris
- Website: https://crossfit306.ca/be-like-bruce-fitness-festival

Bruce Gordon (November 14, 1962 – September 29, 2017) served as Saskatoon Detective Sergeant for the Saskatoon Police Service in the Sex Crimes Unit and the Major Crime/Homicide Unit. Gordon was an all-round athlete, Director of Investigations, and graduated from the University of Saskatchewan College of Law in 2016.

== Early life ==
Gordon grew up on a farm near Marsden, Saskatchewan.

== Later years ==
Gordon was a forward with the Saskatoon Blades and Medicine Hat Tigers, a hockey player who became the Saskatoon Blades captain during the early 1980s. He also coached midget hockey. Before his death Gordon was honoured with a Bruce Gordon banner in the SaskTel Centre, and players adorned their hockey helmets with #BeLikeBruce stickers. Additionally at the season home opener – featuring the two teams Gordon played for, the Blades and the Tigers – the "Cops for Cancer" fundraiser raised money in his name towards cancer research.

Gordon was also active as a swimmer, weightlifter, and cyclist. He competed in national Crossfit competitions such as the CanWest Games, marathons, triathlons, and iron man competitions, such as the Penticton Ironman which he completed nine times. In 2019, Crossfit 306 held the #BeLikeBruce Fitness Festival combining CrossFit with a triathlon in his honour, and raised $15,000 towards Pancreatic Cancer Research. When he was in the last days of Stage 4 pancreatic cancer, hundreds of people came to Saskatoon's Avalon Park in a crossfit flash workout to honour him.

Gordon started out in C Platoon with the Saskatoon Police Service before moving up through the Service as Saskatoon Detective Sergeant in the Sex Crimes Unite as well as the Major Crime/Homicide Unit. Gordon was honoured in 2004 with the Exemplary Service Medal, and honoured posthumously in 2021 with the Chief's Award of Excellence.

Then Gordon turned to a career as detective of investigations in British Columbia for the inaugural civilian oversight of police officers. Following his stay in British Columbia, Gordon returned to school to study law at the University of Saskatchewan in order to become a defence lawyer. As a student, Gordon kept active with the College of Physicians and Surgeons of Saskatchewan as well as the Saskatchewan Human Rights Commission. Gordon graduated in 2016 at a special ceremony called early at Saskatoon's Court of Queen's Bench and was called to the bar in the spring of 2017, and served with Cuelenaere LLP. At the same time as Gordon was called to the bar, his wife Chris graduated from the Edward's School of Business. Police Chief Clive Weighill made an announcement at the special ceremony held to call Gordon to the bar. In tribute to Bruce Gordon, the Saskatoon Police gym was named the Bruce Gordon Physical Fitness Centre.

World Pancreatic Day on November 19 is honoured with the #BeLikeBruce Memorial Pancreatic Cancer Research Fund established by his family which is housed at the College of Medicine, University of Saskatchewan.

In recognition of his contributions to the community, Gordon was bestowed the Saskatoon-Grasswood Canada 150 Award. In addition to his career and dedication to the athletic community Gordon was a volunteer, and offered his time to PRIDE Saskatoon, the Saskatoon Road Runners Club, John Lake Home and School Council, and the Saskatoon Sexual Assault Centre and many other local organisations.
