= Robert A. Haag =

American meteorite collector

- Born: 1956 (age 69–70)
- Occupation: Meteorite hunter
- Known for: Collecting meteorites

Robert A. Haag (born 1956) is an American meteorite collector. Some meteorites acquired from Haag are currently on display in the Smithsonian.

== Detainment ==
Haag was detained as a preventative measure pending judgement in Argentina, charged with removing protected rocks (the 37 ton El Chaco meteorite). Haag claimed he was set up by an Argentinian mineral dealer, who had asserted the meteorite belonged to the land owner and the dealer entered into an arrangement to broker the sale to Haag for $200,000. Haag was released from detainment and left Argentina after paying bail and having his passport returned.

== Achievements ==
Haag was the first private citizen and meteorite hunter to discover a lunar meteorite, known as Calcalong Creek. It was discovered among other meteorites coming out of the Australian Millbillillie meteorite (eucrite achondrite) strewn field. It was bought as a Millbillillie by Haag, but he discovered it was a lunar meteorite. He was also one of the first private citizens to obtain Martian meteorites.

He was featured in a story in Omni Magazine in July 1993.

== See also ==
- Glossary of meteoritics
