= Gancedo =

Coordinates: 27°30′S 61°42′W

- Municipality and village
- Interactive map of Gancedo
- Country: Argentina
- Province: Chaco Province
- Time zone: UTC−3 (ART)

Gancedo is a village and municipality in Chaco Province in northern Argentina.

In September 2016, a huge meteorite – the second largest ever found – was exhumed near the town. It weighed 30 tonnes and fell to Earth around 2000 BC.
