= Gibeon Constituency =

Electoral constituency in the Hardap region of central Namibia

Coordinates: 17.7667°S 25.1333°E

Gibeon constituency (red) in the Hardap Region

Gibeon Constituency is an electoral constituency in the Hardap Region of Namibia. The administrative centre of the constituency is the village of Gibeon (Khoekhoe: Khaxa-tsûs). It had a population of 12,122 in 2011, up from 11,541 in 2001.

The constituency originally covered an area of 50,365 km^{2} (19,446 sq mi). In August 2013, Gibeon Constituency lost the western part of its territory, which became a constituency of its own, namely Daweb Constituency. As a result, Gibeon constituency now covers an area of 10,156 km^{2} (3,921 sq mi). It had a population of 8,034 in 2023. As of 2020 the constituency had 3,951 registered voters.

== Politics ==
Gibeon Constituency is traditionally a stronghold of the South West Africa People's Organization (SWAPO) party. In the 2004 regional election, SWAPO candidate Karl Kisting received 1,769 of the 3,145 votes cast and became councillor.

The 2015 regional elections were won by Jeremias van Neel of SWAPO with 1,255 votes. Niklaas Jacobus Dawson of the Rally for Democracy and Progress (RDP) came second with 206 votes, followed by Geoffrey Keramen of the Democratic Turnhalle Alliance (DTA) with 122 votes. The 2020 regional election was narrowly won by Paul Isaak of the Landless People's Movement (LPM, a new party registered in 2018). He obtained 890 votes. The sitting councillor van Neel (SWAPO) came second with 769 votes.
