= Gibeon (meteorite) =

Meteorite

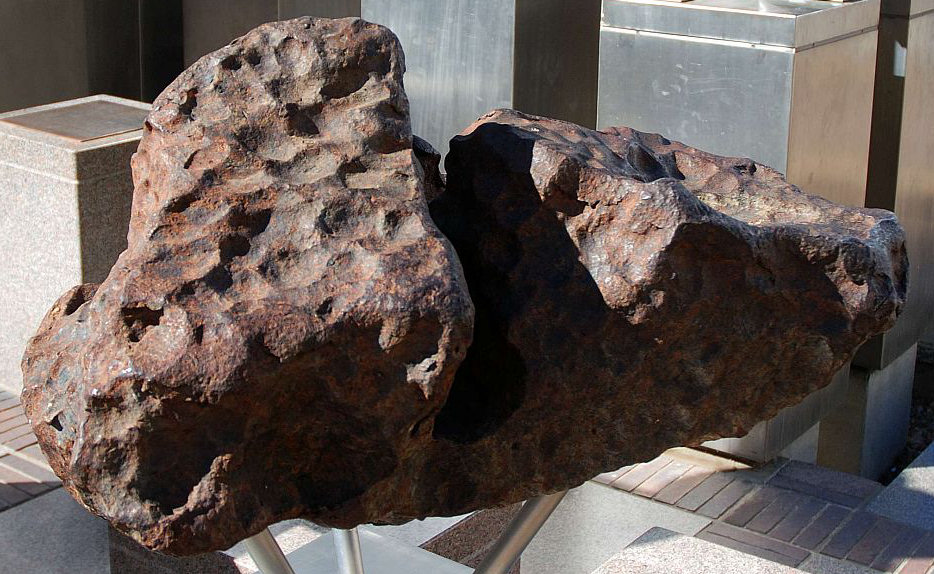
- Fragment of the Gibeon meteorite in Post Street Mall, Windhoek
- Type: Iron
- Structural classification: Fine octahedrite
- Group: IVA
- Composition: 91,8% Fe; 7,7% Ni; 0,5% Co; 0,04% P; 2,4 ppm Ir; 1,97 ppm Ga; 0,111 ppm Ge
- Country: Namibia
- Region: Great Namaqualand
- Coordinates: 25°20′S 18°00′E
- Observed fall: No
- Fall date: prehistoric times
- Found date: 1838
- TKW: 26000 kg
- Strewn field: Yes
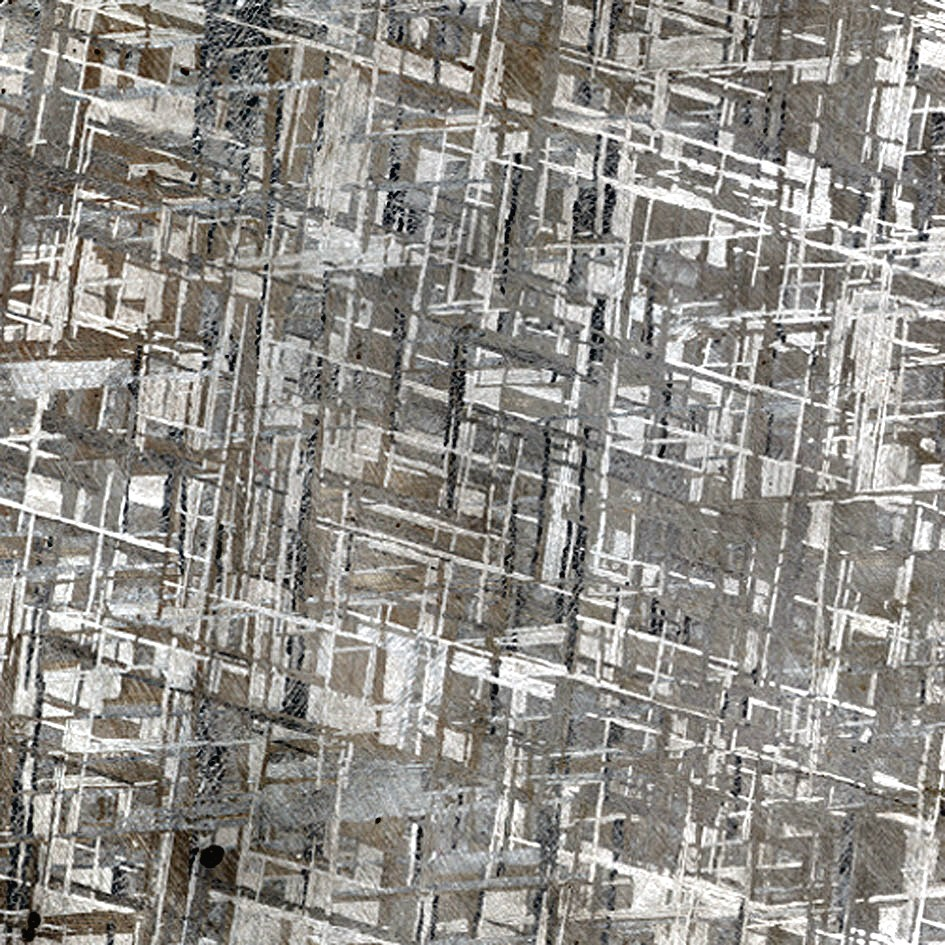
- Widmanstätten pattern
- Related media on Wikimedia Commons

Gibeon is a meteorite that fell in prehistoric times in Namibia. It was named after the nearest town, Gibeon.

== History ==
The meteorite was discovered by the Nama people and used by them to make tools and weapons, including heads for their assegais.

In 1836 the English captain J. E. Alexander collected samples of the meteorite in the vicinity of the Fish River and sent them to London. There John Herschel analyzed them and confirmed for the first time the extraterrestrial nature of the material.

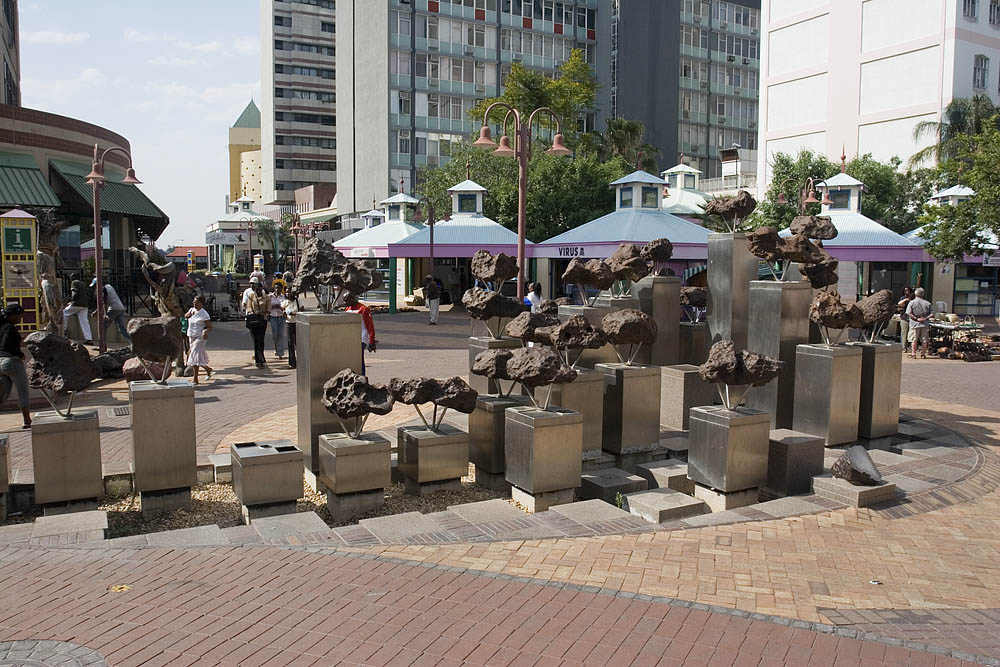
Post Street Mall & Gibeon Meteorite

Between 1911 and 1913, 33 fragments of the meteorite were collected in the vicinity of Gibeon and brought to the capital Windhoek. They weighed between 195 and 506 kilograms (430 and 1,116 lb) and were first stored, then displayed at the Zoo Park as a single heap. In 1975 a public fountain displaying the meteorite fragments was planned. The pieces were removed and stored at the Alte Feste, where two of the fragments were stolen. The fountain was eventually erected in Post Street Mall, with two empty pillars for the missing fragments. Since then, two more fragments were removed from the fountain, so that it displays only 29 pieces today.

The collection displayed on the fountain in Windhoek's Central Business District was proclaimed a National Monument (Category: geology) on 15 February 1950. Additionally, it was decided that all meteorites found in Namibia would automatically be protected as National Monuments and should not be removed from where they have been found, nor damaged in any way.

== Strewn field ==
The fragments of the meteorite in the strewn field were dispersed over an elliptical area 390 kilometres (240 mi) long and 120 kilometres (75 mi) wide, the second largest known strewn field in the world (after Aletai meteorite strewn field in Northwestern China). The core of this area is situated near the village of Gibeon in Namibia's Hardap Region. About 100–150 different fragments have been collected over time, and additional pieces are still found occasionally.

== Composition and classification ==
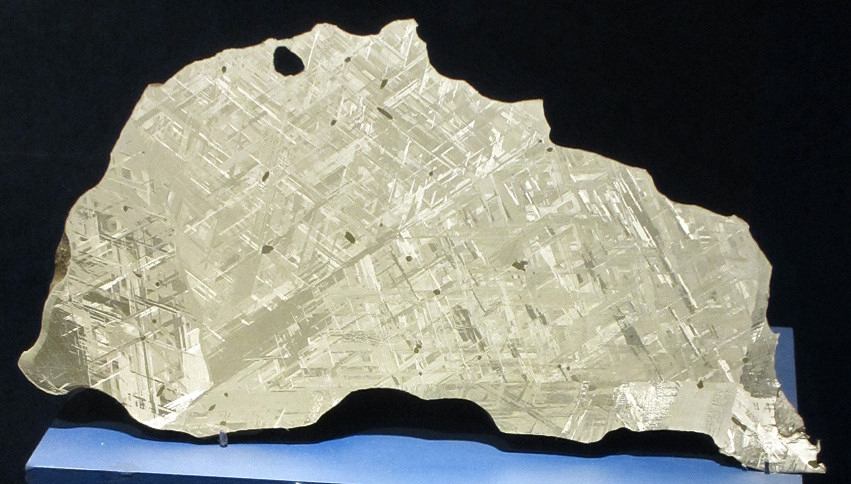
Gibeon full slice, NMNH

The term Gibeon encompasses the total extent of meteoritic material fallen from the sky during this fall. This material is classified as iron meteorite belonging to the chemical group IVA.

Gibeon meteorites are composed of an iron-nickel alloy containing significant amounts of cobalt and phosphorus. The crystal structure of this meteorite provides a classic example of fine octahedrite and the Widmanstätten pattern.

== See also ==
- Glossary of meteoritics
- Hoba meteorite
