= Lone Rock, Saskatchewan =

Community in Saskatchewan, Canada

Coordinates: 53°03′00″N 109°52′44″W

Lone Rock is a hamlet in the west central region of the Canadian province of Saskatchewan, about 34 kilometres (21 mi) south of Lloydminster and accessible from Highway 688.

== Demographics ==
In the 2021 Census of Population conducted by Statistics Canada, Lone Rock had a population of 50 living in 18 of its 19 total private dwellings, a change of -34.2% from its 2016 population of 76. With a land area of 0.33 km^{2} (0.13 sq mi), it had a population density of 151.5/km^{2} (392.4/sq mi) in 2021.
