= Gibeon railway station =

Railway station in Namibia

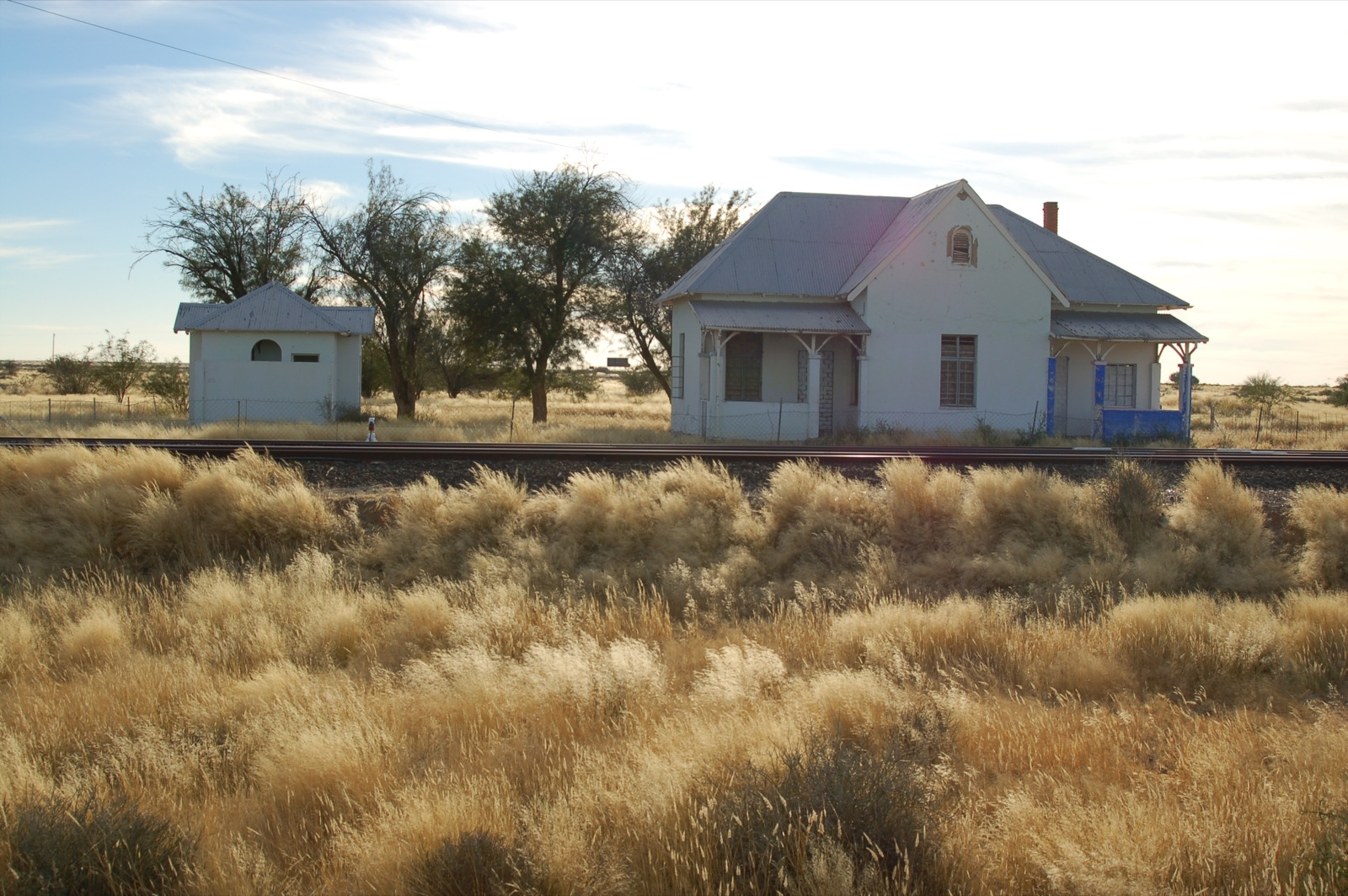
Gibeon station

Gibeon railway station was a railway station serving the town of Gibeon in Namibia. It was part of the TransNamib Railway, and is located along the Windhoek to Upington line that connects Namibia with South Africa.

The station was last used before 1996. In 2006, a local businessman claimed that he had bought the station from TransNamib and was going to convert it into a historical site with tourist accommodations. However, TransNamib denied that any such sale or conversion of the station was taking place, and that they had only leased a portion of the property for use as a craft centre.

== See also ==
- Rail transport in Namibia
