= Gibeon, Namibia =

Gibeon Khaxa-tsûs
- Village
- Location within Namibia
- Coordinates: 25°07′28″S 17°45′58″E
- Country: Namibia
- Region: Hardap Region
- Constituency: Gibeon Constituency
- Founder: Kido Witbooi

Population (2023)
  - Total: 4,120
- Time zone: UTC+2 (South African Standard Time)
- Climate: BWh

Gibeon (Nama: Khaxa-tsûs) is a village in Gibeon Constituency in the Hardap Region of Namibia. The village had 4,120 inhabitants in 2023.

== History ==
Gibeon, originally known by the name Khaxa-tsûs, received its name from Kido Witbooi, first Kaptein of the ǀKhowesin, a subtribe of the Orlam. He arrived with his followers in about 1850, shortly after a Rhenish mission station was established here. Gibeon has been the home town of this group, subsequently also known as the Witbooi Nama, ever since.

== Buildings and structures ==
Gibeon Railway Station is located in the village. The station is a stop on the TransNamib Railway. It is also home to a public sports stadium. The stadium was built in 1986 and fell into disrepair by 1993. In 2003, the Ministry of Sport of Namibia budgeted N$ 450,000 for repairs and awarded part of the public tender to Namibia Renovations, but the company disappeared days after winning the tender and their whereabouts could not be confirmed. As of December 2007, none of the repairs have been completed. When the stadium was operational, it was known for its "excellent" gravel playing surface, which attracted teams from larger towns in southern Namibia.

== Geography ==
Historical population
Year	Pop.	±% p.a.
2011	2,244	—
2023	4,120	+5.19%

=== Weather and climate ===
Gibeon normally receives an annual average rainfall of 148 millimetres (5.8 in), although in the 2010/2011 rainy season 494 millimetres (19.4 in) were measured.

=== Gibeon meteorite ===
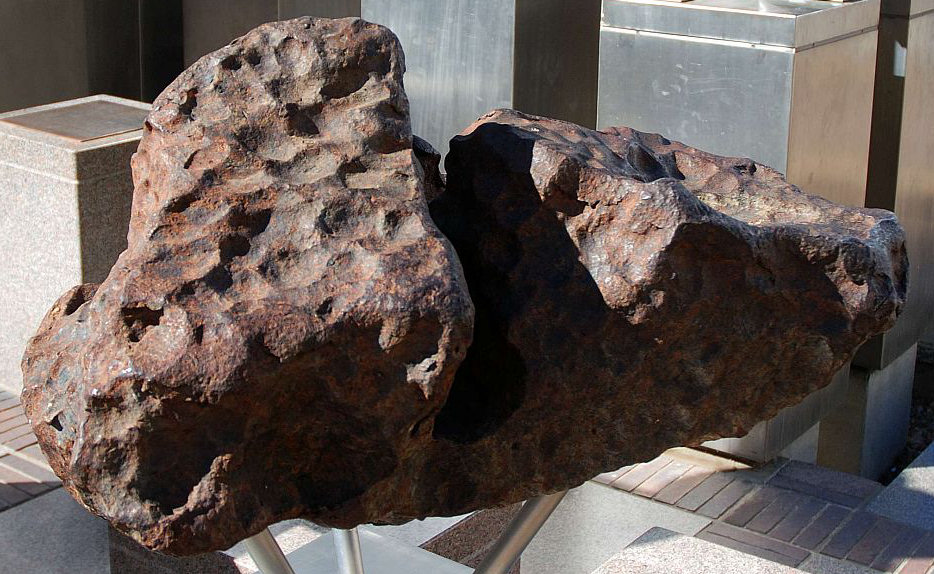
Fragment of the Gibeon meteorite on display in Windhoek

Gibeon is known for the Gibeon meteorite that crashed over a 275 km long and 100 km wide area in prehistoric times. It is an iron meteorite belonging to the chemical group IVA Gibeon meteorites are made of an iron-nickel alloy, but also contain cobalt and phosphorus. The crystalline structure of this meteorite is a classic example of fine octahedrite and the Widmanstätten pattern aesthetically appreciated both by collectors and jewel designers. However, collecting meteorites or damaging them is illegal, as all meteorites found in Namibia are automatically protected as National Monuments.

About 100–150 different fragments have been collected over time, and additional pieces are still found occasionally. The largest collection of Gibeon meteorites is displayed on a fountain in Windhoek's Central Business District.

== Politics ==
=== Local authority elections ===
Upon Namibian independence Gibeon was governed by a seven-seat village council. The first local elections run in Namibia, the 1992 local elections, was won by SWAPO which obtained 635 votes and gained four seats. The Democratic Turnhalle Alliance (DTA) came second with 483 votes and three seats. The 1998 local authority elections saw a similar result. SWAPO again obtained four seats with 293 votes, DTA got the remaining thee seats with 219 votes.

The 2015 local authority election was also won by the SWAPO party which gained four seats (680 votes). The remaining seat went to the Democratic Turnhalle Alliance (DTA, 82 votes). The 2020 local authority election was won by the newly formed Landless People's Movement (LPM) which scored well all over Hardap. LPM gained 514 votes and three seats in the village council, SWAPO gained the remaining two seats with 433 votes.

=== National Assembly elections ===
In the 2004 and 2009 national elections, Gibeon has given the ruling SWAPO party significantly less support than the national percentage, though SWAPO was still the highest vote getter in both elections. In the 2004 National Assembly election, 4,956 residents of Gibeon constituency voted; SWAPO received 50.7% of Gibeon's votes, compared to 76.1% nationally. The COD received 29.3% of the vote and the DTA received 9.3%. Of the remaining 6 parties, the UDF received 3%, the NUDO received 2.1%, the RP received 1.8%. The MAG, NDMC and SWANU combined to receive the remaining 2.3%.

In the 2009 presidential election, voter participation declined to 3,669, a 26% drop from the previous national election. Gibeon voters supported incumbent President Hifikepunye Pohamba's candidacy but significantly less than the national average; nationally, SWAPO's Pohamba received 76.4%, but in Gibeon he received only 46.1% of the 3,669 total votes. The closest candidate was Hidipo Hamutenya of RDP, who received 20% of Gibeon's votes, above his national vote percentage of 11.1%. The next closest candidate was Frans Migub ǀGoagoseb of the NDMC, who received 207 votes in the constituency (5.6%). Gibeon's support for ǀGoagoseb equaled nearly 12% of the candidate's total support nationally (207 of 1,760 total votes). David Isaacs of the DP received 205 votes (5.6% in the constituency) and around 9% of the national vote total (205 of 1,859 nationally). Henk Mudge of the RP (5.4%), Katuutire Kaura of DTA (5%) and Ben Ulenga of COD (3.7%) received a higher percentage of votes in Gibeon than their national averages.

== Notable people ==
- Johannes Isaaks (1941–2010), first mayor of Gibeon as well as a prominent political activist.
- Gerhard Tötemeyer, professor emeritus and retired politician
- Hendrik Witbooi, politician
- Lucia Witbooi, politician and schoolteacher
