= List of meteorite minerals =

A meteorite mineral is a mineral found chiefly or exclusively within meteorites or meteorite-derived material. This is a list of those minerals, excluding minerals also commonly found in terrestrial rocks. As of 1997 there were approximately 295 mineral species which have been identified in meteorites.

== List of meteorite minerals ==
Names	Composition	Occurrence
Akimotoite	(Mg,Fe)SiO_{3}	
Alabandite	MnS	
Allabogdanite	(Fe,Ni)_{2}P	
Antitaenite		
Brezinaite	Cr_{3}S_{4}	
Brianite	Na_{2}CaMg(PO_{4})_{2}	
Calcium–aluminium-rich inclusion		
Carlsbergite	CrN	the North Chile meteorite in the Antofagasta Province, Chile; the Nentmannsdorf meteorite of Bahretal, Saxony, Germany; the Okinawa Trough, Senkaku Islands, Okinawa Prefecture, Japan; the Uwet meteorite of Cross River State, Nigeria; the Sikhote-Alin meteorite, Sikhote-Alin Mountains, Russia; the Hex River Mountains meteorite from the Cape Winelands District, Western Cape Province, South Africa; the Canyon Diablo meteorite of Meteor Crater, Coconino County, Arizona, United States; the Smithonia meteorite of Oglethorpe County, Georgia, United States; the Kenton County meteorite of Kenton County, Kentucky, United States; the Lombard meteorite of Broadwater County, Montana, United States; the Murphy meteorite of Cherokee County and the Lick Creek meteorite of Davidson County, North Carolina, United States; the New Baltimore meteorite of Somerset County, Pennsylvania, United States
Chladniite	{Ca}{Na_{8}}{Ca_{4}Na_{4}}{(Mg,Fe^{2+})_{43}}(PO4)_{36}	
Cohenite	(Fe,Ni,Co)_{3}C	
Daubréelite	Fe^{2+}Cr^{3+}_{2}S_{4}	ALH 84001 meteorite, Hoba meteorite, and the Canyon Diablo meteorite.
Dmitryivanovite	CaAl_{2}O_{4}	
Elaliite		Nightfall Meteorite, Somalia
Elgoresyite	(Mg,Fe)_{5}Si_{2}O_{9}	
Elkinstantonite		Nightfall Meteorite, Somalia
Grossite	CaAl_{4}O_{7}	
Hapkeite	Fe_{2}Si	
Haxonite	(Fe,Ni)_{23}C_{6}	
Heazlewoodite	Ni_{3}S_{2}	
Hibonite	(Ca,Ce)(Al,Ti,Mg)_{12}O_{19}	
Iridium	Ir	
Kamacite	α-(Fe,Ni); Fe^{0+}_{0.9}Ni_{0.1}	
Keilite	(Fe,Mg)S)	
Krotite	CaAl_{2}O_{4}	
Lonsdaleite	C	Canyon Diablo, Kenna, and Allan Hills 77283
Melilite	(Ca,Na)_{2}(Al,Mg,Fe^{2+})[(Al,Si)SiO_{7}]	
Merrillite	Ca_{9}NaMg(PO_{4})_{7}	lunar rocks, martian meteorite
Meteoric iron	Fe and Ni in different ratios	
Maskelynite		
Mackinawite	(Fe,Ni)_{1 + x}S (where x = 0 to 0.11)	
Majorite	Mg_{3}(MgSi)(SiO_{4})_{3}	
Moissanite	SiC	
Nierite	Si_{3}N_{4}	
Niningerite	MgS	
Oldhamite	(Ca, Mg)S	
Olsenite	(KFe_{4}(PO_{4})_{3})	El Ali, "Nightfall Meteorite", Somalia
Panethite	(Na,Ca)_{2}(Mg,Fe)_{2}(PO_{4})_{2}	
Panguite	(Ti^{4+},Sc,Al,Mg,Zr,Ca)_{1.8}O_{3}	
Pentlandite	iron nickel sulfide:(Fe,Ni)_{9}S_{8}	
Plessite		
Presolar grains		
Ringwoodite (discovered in the Tenham meteorite)	Mg_{2}SiO_{4}	
Roaldite	(Fe,Ni)_{4}N	
Schreibersite	(Fe,Ni)_{3}P	
Sinoite	Si_{2}N_{2}O	
Taenite	γ-(Ni,Fe)	
Tetrataenite		
Troilite	FeS	
Wadsleyite	Mg_{2}SiO_{4}	
Xifengite	Fe_{5}Si_{3}	

[] indicates repeating units

== See also ==
- Glossary of meteoritics
- List of minerals
