= Allendeite =

Oxide mineral

General
- Category: Oxide minerals
- Formula: Sc_{4}Zr_{3}O_{12}
- IMA symbol: Aed
- Dana classification: 4.6.8. Simple oxides
- Crystal system: Trigonal
- Crystal class: Rhombohedral (3̅); H–M Symbol: (3̅)
- Space group: R3̅
- Unit cell: a = 9.396, c = 8.720 [Å] V = 666.7 Å^{3}

Identification
- Crystal habit: Microscopic crystals, inclusions
- Specific gravity: 4.84 (calculated)
- Refractive index: 2.14 (calculated)

Allendeite, Sc_{4}Zr_{3}O_{12}, is an oxide mineral. Allendeite was discovered in a small ultrarefractory inclusion within the Allende meteorite. This inclusion has been named ACM-1. It is one of several scandium rich minerals that have been found in meteorites. Allendeite is trigonal, with a calculated density of 4.84 g/cm^{3}. The new mineral was found along with hexamolybdenum. These minerals, are believed to demonstrate conditions during the early stages of the Solar System, as is the case with many CV3 carbonaceous chondrites such as the Allende meteorite. It is named after the Allende meteorite that fell in 1969 near Pueblito de Allende, Chihuahua, Mexico.

== Occurrence ==
Allendeite was found as nano-crystals in an ultrarefractory inclusion in the Allende meteorite. The Allende meteorite has shown to be full of new minerals, after nearly forty years it has produced one in ten of the now known minerals in meteorites. This CV3 carbonaceous chondrite was the largest ever recovered on earth and is referred to as the best-studied meteorite in history. The inclusion has only been viewed via electron microscopy. The sample is one centimeter in diameter and has been entrusted to the Smithsonian Institution's National Museum of Natural History with the catalog number USNM7554. One crystal studied is a single 15 x 25 micron size with included perovskite, various osmium-iridium-molybdenum-tungsten alloys, and scandium-stabilized tazheranite. In fact, all allendeite was in contact with perovskite. The grains are anhedral, with no observable crystal forms or twinning.

== Significance ==
Various scandium rich minerals have been found in meteorites, including; davisite, panguite, kangite, tazheranite, thortveitite, and eringaite. Of these, allendeite is the most Sc rich, with only pretulite containing substantially more scandium.

== Appearance ==
Color, streak, luster, hardness, tenacity, cleavage, fracture, density, and refractive index could not be observed because the grain size was too small and the section bearing the mineral was optically thick.

== See also ==
- Classification of minerals
- List of minerals
