= Extraterrestrial diamonds =

Diamonds formed outside of Earth

Although diamonds on Earth are rare, extraterrestrial diamonds (diamonds formed outside of Earth) are very common. Diamonds so small that they contain only about 2000 carbon atoms are abundant in meteorites, and some of them formed in stars before the Solar System existed. High pressure experiments suggest large amounts of diamonds are formed from methane on the ice giant planets Uranus and Neptune, while some planets in other planetary systems may be almost pure diamond. Diamonds are also found in stars and may have been the first mineral ever to have formed.

== Meteorites ==
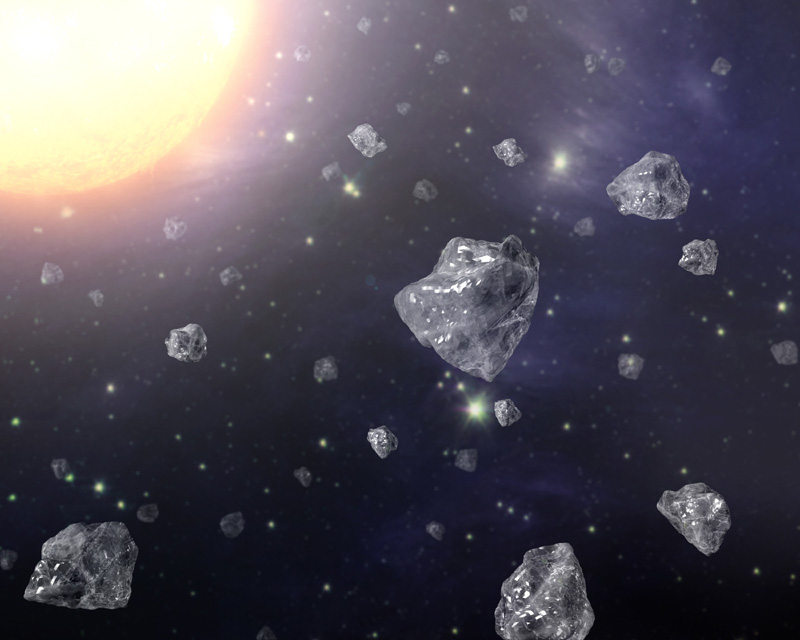
Artist's conception of a multitude of tiny diamonds next to a hot star.

In 1987, a team of scientists examined some primitive meteorites and found grains of diamond about 2.5 nanometers in diameter (nanodiamonds). Trapped in them were noble gases whose isotopic signature indicated they came from outside the Solar System. Analyses of additional primitive meteorites also found nanodiamonds. The record of their origins was preserved despite a long and violent history that started when they were ejected from a star into the interstellar medium, went through the formation of the Solar System, were incorporated into a planetary body that was later broken up into meteorites, and finally crashed on the Earth's surface.

In meteorites, nanodiamonds make up about 3 percent of the carbon and 0.04% of the total mass. Grains of silicon carbide and graphite also have anomalous isotopic patterns. Collectively they are known as presolar grains or stardust and their properties constrain models of nucleosynthesis in giant stars and supernovae.

It is unclear how many nanodiamonds in meteorites are really from outside the Solar System. Only a very small fraction of them contain noble gases of presolar origin, and until recently it was not possible to study them individually. On average, the ratio of carbon-12 to carbon-13 matches that of the Earth's atmosphere, while that of nitrogen-14 to nitrogen-15 matches the Sun. Techniques such as atom probe tomography will make it possible to examine individual grains, but due to the limited number of atoms, the isotopic resolution is limited.

If most nanodiamonds did form in the Solar System, that raises the question of how this is possible. On the Earth's surface, graphite is the stable carbon mineral, while larger diamonds can only be formed in the kind of temperatures and pressures that are found deep in the mantle. However, nanodiamonds are close to molecular size: one with a diameter of 2.8 nm, the median size, contains about 1800 carbon atoms. In very small minerals, surface energy is important and diamonds are more stable than graphite because the diamond structure is more compact. The crossover in stability is at between 1 and 5 nm. At even smaller sizes, a variety of other forms of carbon such as fullerenes can be found, as well as diamond cores wrapped in fullerenes.

The most carbon-rich meteorites, with abundances up to 0.7% by mass, are ureilites. These have no known parent body and their origin is controversial. Diamonds are common in highly shocked ureilites, and most are thought to have been formed by the shock of the impact with either Earth or other bodies in space. However, much larger diamonds were found in fragments of a meteorite called Almahata Sitta, found in the Nubian Desert of Sudan. They contained inclusions of iron- and sulfur-bearing minerals, the first inclusions to be found in extraterrestrial diamonds. They were dated at 4.5 billion-year-old crystals and were formed at pressures greater than 20 gigapascals. The authors of a 2018 study concluded that they must have come from a protoplanet, no longer intact, with a size between that of the moon and Mars.

Infrared emissions from space, observed by the Infrared Space Observatory and the Spitzer Space Telescope, has made it clear that carbon-containing molecules are ubiquitous in space. These include polycyclic aromatic hydrocarbons (PAHs), fullerenes and diamondoids (hydrocarbons that have the same crystal structure as diamond). If dust in space has a similar concentration, a gram of it would carry up to 10 quadrillion of them, but so far there is little evidence for their presence in the interstellar medium; they are difficult to tell apart from diamondoids.

== Planets ==
=== Solar System ===
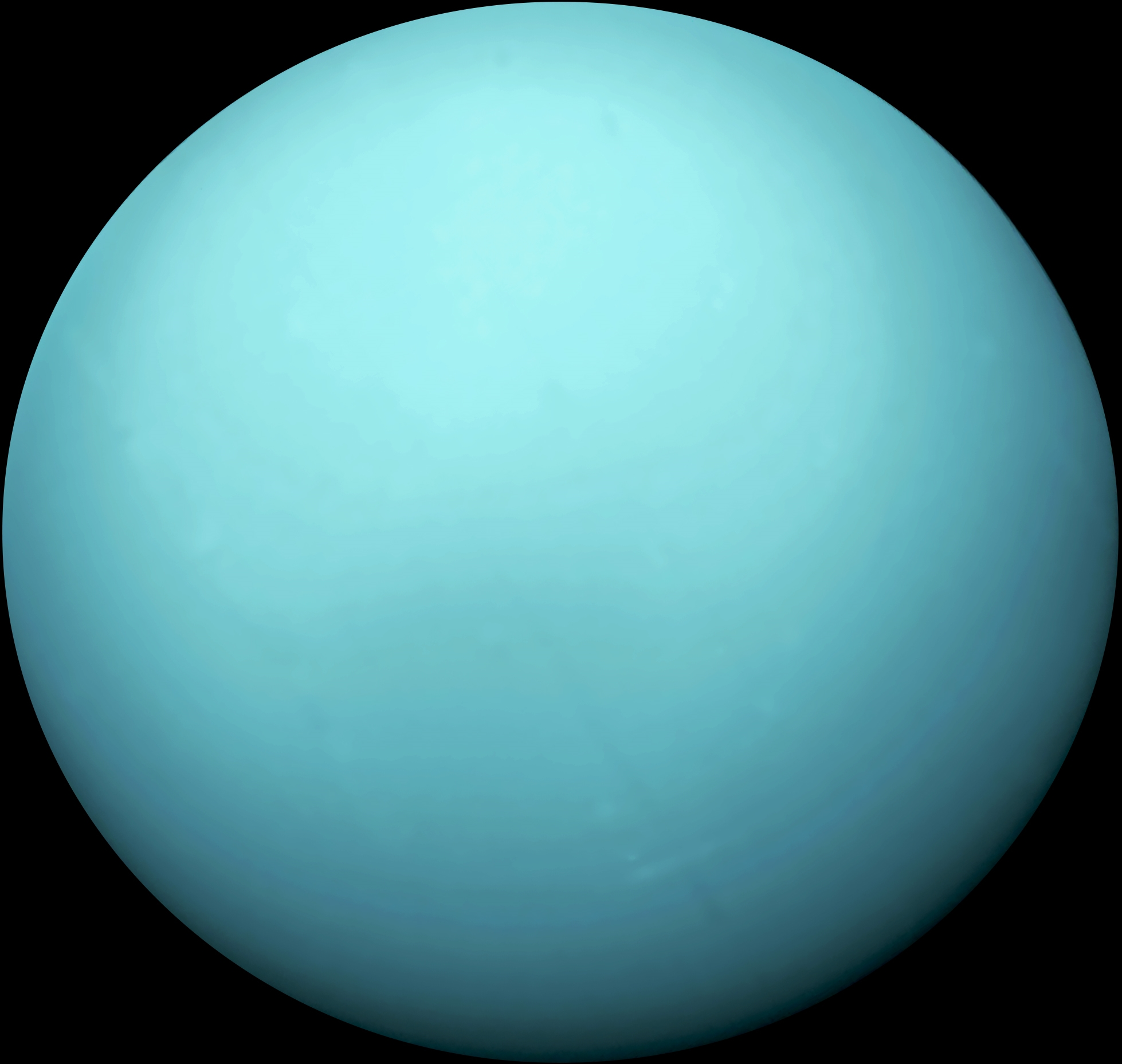
Uranus, imaged by Voyager 2 in 1986, shown in enhanced color.

In 1981, Martin Ross wrote a paper titled "The ice layer in Uranus and Neptune—diamonds in the sky?" in which he proposed that huge quantities of diamonds might be found in the interior of these planets. At Lawrence Livermore, he had analyzed data from shock-wave compression of methane (CH_{4}) and found that the extreme pressure separated the carbon atom from the hydrogen, freeing it to form diamond.

Theoretical modeling by Sandro Scandolo and others predicted that diamonds would form at pressures over 300 gigapascals (GPa), but even at lower pressures methane would be disrupted and form chains of hydrocarbons. High pressure experiments at the University of California Berkeley using a diamond anvil cell found both structures at only 50 GPa and a temperature of 2500 kelvins, equivalent to depths of 7000 kilometers below Neptune's cloud tops. Another experiment at the Geophysical Laboratory saw methane becoming unstable at only 7 GPa and 2000 kelvins. After forming, denser diamonds would sink. This "diamond rain" would convert potential energy into heat and help drive the convection that generates Neptune's magnetic field.

There are some uncertainties in how well the experimental results apply to Uranus and Neptune. Water and hydrogen mixed with the methane may alter the chemical reactions. A physicist at the Fritz Haber Institute in Berlin showed that the carbon on these planets is not concentrated enough to form diamonds from scratch. A proposal that diamonds may also form in Jupiter and Saturn, where the concentration of carbon is far lower, was considered unlikely because the diamonds would quickly dissolve.

Experiments looking for conversion of methane to diamonds found weak signals and did not reach the temperatures and pressures expected in Uranus and Neptune. However, a recent experiment used shock heating by lasers to reach temperatures and pressures expected at a depth of 10,000 kilometers below the surface of Uranus. When they did this to polystyrene, nearly every carbon atom in the material was incorporated into diamond crystals within a nanosecond.

The relation of diamond precipitation to the mechanics of the internal structure of icy giant planets has been theorized and studied for more than 30 years. However, more recent work in the field has led to the development of nanodiamonds under ice giant plant conditions similar to those on Uranus and Neptune utilizing laser driven shock compressions and X-ray free electron lasers. The crystallization of carbon under these conditions has been observed in a period of nanoseconds, which further narrows the scope of the formation processes explored in earlier shock wave experiments. These laboratory analogue experiments which occur at these nanosecond timescales are believed to accurately replicate processes that will occur on planetary timescales. This strongly supports the idea that diamonds can precipitate in the interiors of planets, but also suggests that it is far more likely to take place more rapidly and on smaller scales than previously hypothesized. Recent studies also suggest that diamond precipitation may be extremely sensitive to a material’s chemical environment, including oxygen, water, and various other volatiles present in the interior of ice giant planets. These various components may alter reaction pathways, which would subsequently inhibit precipitation of pure diamond and either create other more complex carbon oxygen compounds, or other diamond precursors. In order to form these diamonds, methane (combined with other unreactive components) may need higher pressure and temperature than was previously anticipated. Consequently, this may limit the extent of diamond precipitation in certain planetary regions and similar icy environments.

These results suggest that methane in the interiors of icy giants like Uranus and Neptune can convert into heavier hydrocarbons and undergo phase separation into diamond and hydrogen at high pressures, which may lead to stratified internal structures. Depending on the thermodynamic conditions at varying localities in the interior of these icy giant planets, it is increasingly plausible that these carbon, oxygen, and hydrogen models support carbonaceous compounds reorganizing into diamond structures at depth. The analogue laboratory models formed diamonds on the nanometer scale, which demonstrates the formation of diamond particles at nanometer scales under conditions relevant to Uranus and Neptune. This underscores the importance of evaluating the chemical impact on mass radius correlations, which in turn restrict the materials which form these planets.

It also appears that these processes have significant influences on the planetary structure and evolution of ice giants. The formation and sedimentation of dense carbon phases may influence internal density distribution and thermal evolution of these planets. The occurrence of these carbon rich solid phases may affect the electrical conductivity of the deep interior of icy giant planets and‚ thus‚ the geometry and strength of the highly complex planetary magnetic fields of both Uranus and Neptune․ Furthermore, Neptune’s higher luminosity suggests that diamond accumulation and creation may be responsible for an internal energy source impacting Neptune’s planetary development in relation to Uranus. At this point, direct observational evidence remains unavailable to support these hypotheses, however, the plausibility of these diamond formation processes is supported by current experimental and theoretical research.

=== Extrasolar ===
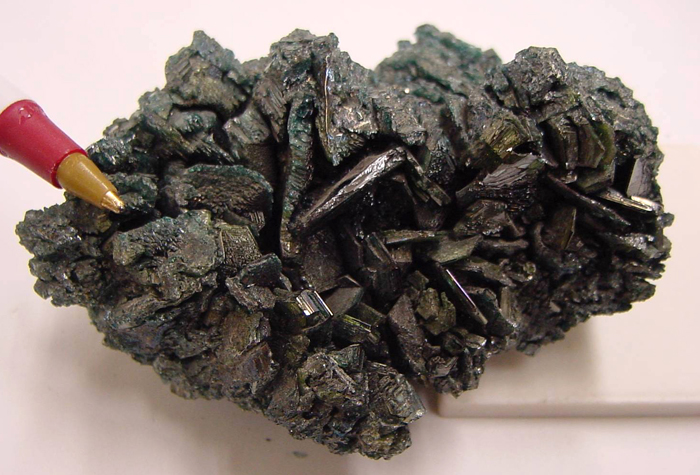
On Earth, the natural form of silicon carbide is a rare mineral, moissanite.

In the Solar System the rocky planets Mercury, Venus, Earth and Mars are 70% to 90% silicates by mass. By contrast, stars with a high ratio of carbon to oxygen may be orbited by planets that are mostly carbides, with the most common material being silicon carbide. This has a higher thermal conductivity and a lower thermal expansivity than silicates. This would result in more rapid conductive cooling near the surface, but lower down the convection could be at least as vigorous as that in silicate planets.

One such planet is PSR J1719-1438 b, companion to a millisecond pulsar. It has a density at least twice that of lead, and may be composed mainly of ultra-dense diamond. It is believed to be the remnant of a white dwarf after the pulsar stripped away more than 99 percent of its mass.

Another planet, 55 Cancri e, has been called a "super-Earth" because, like Earth, it is a rocky planet orbiting a sun-like star, but it has twice the radius and eight times the mass. The researchers who discovered it in 2012 concluded that it was carbon-rich, making an abundance of diamond likely. However, later analyses using multiple measures for the star's chemical composition indicated that the star has 25 percent more oxygen than carbon. This makes it less likely that the planet itself is a carbon planet.

== Stars ==
It has been proposed that diamonds exist in carbon-rich stars, particularly white dwarfs; Carbonado, a polycrystalline mix of diamond, graphite, and amorphous carbon, which is one of the hardest natural forms of carbon, is also present, and could come from supernovae and white dwarfs. The white dwarf BPM 37093, located 50 light-years (4.7×10^{14} km) away in the constellation Centaurus, has a diameter of 2,500 miles (4,000 km), and may have a diamond core, which would make it one of the largest diamonds in the known universe. For this reason it was given the nickname Lucy.

In 2008, Robert Hazen and colleagues at the Carnegie Institution in Washington, D.C. published a paper, "Mineral evolution", in which they explored the history of mineral formation and found that the diversity of minerals has changed over time as the conditions have changed. Before the Solar System formed, only a small number of minerals were present, including diamonds and olivine. The first minerals may have been small diamonds formed in stars because stars are rich in carbon and diamonds form at a higher temperature than any other known mineral.

== See also ==
- Extraterrestrial materials
