= Hexamolybdenum =

Molybdenum-dominant alloy mineral

General
- Category: Native mineral alloy
- Formula: (Mo,Ru,Fe,Ir,Os)
- IMA symbol: Hmo
- Strunz classification: 1.XX.00
- Crystal system: Hexagonal
- Crystal class: Dihexagonal dipyramidal (6/mmm); H-M symbol: (6/m 2/m 2/m)
- Space group: P6_{3}/mmc
- Unit cell: a = 2.7506, c = 4.4318 [Å] V = 29.04 Å^{3}, Z = 2

Identification
- Crystal habit: Inclusions and microscopic crystals
- Specific gravity: 11.90 (calculated)

Hexamolybdenum is a molybdenum dominant alloy discovered during a nanomineralogy investigation of the Allende meteorite. Hexamolybdenum was discovered in a small ultrarefractory inclusion within the Allende meteorite. This inclusion has been named ACM-1. Hexamolybdenum is hexagonal, with a calculated density of 11.90 g/cm^{3}. The new mineral was found along with allendeite. These minerals, are believed to demonstrate conditions during the early stages of the Solar System, as is the case with many CV3 carbonaceous chondrites such as the Allende meteorite. Hexamolybdenum lies on a continuum of high-temperature alloys that are found in meteorites and allows a link between osmium, ruthenium, and iron rich meteoritic alloys. The name hexamolybdenum refers to the crystal symmetry (primitive hexagonal) and the molybdenum rich composition. The Allende meteorite fell in 1969 near Pueblito de Allende, Chihuahua, Mexico.

== Occurrence ==
Hexamolybdenum was found as nano-crystals in an ultrarefractory inclusion in the Allende meteorite. The Allende meteorite has shown to be full of new minerals, after nearly forty years it has produced one in ten of the now known minerals in meteorites. This CV3 carbonaceous chondrite was the largest ever recovered on earth and is referred to as the best-studied meteorite in history. The inclusion has only been viewed via electron microscopy. The hexamolybdenum specimen was lost during an attempted ion probe analysis of a bordering grain. Other specimens can be found, however, in the Smithsonian Institution's National Museum of Natural History Allende section USNM 3509HC12 and in section USNM 7590 of NWA 1934, another VC3 chondrite.

It has also been reported from the NWA 1934 CV3 carbonaceous chondrite meteorite from the Erfoud region of Morocco and in the Danubian placer of Straubing, Bavaria.

== Chemical composition ==
Hexamolybdenum is an (molybdenum, ruthenium, iron, iridium, osmium) alloy.

== Appearance ==
Color, streak, luster, hardness, tenacity, cleavage, fracture, density, and refractive index could not be observed because the grain size was too small and the section bearing the mineral was optically thick.

== See also ==
- Classification of minerals
- List of minerals
