= Hibonite =

Mineral

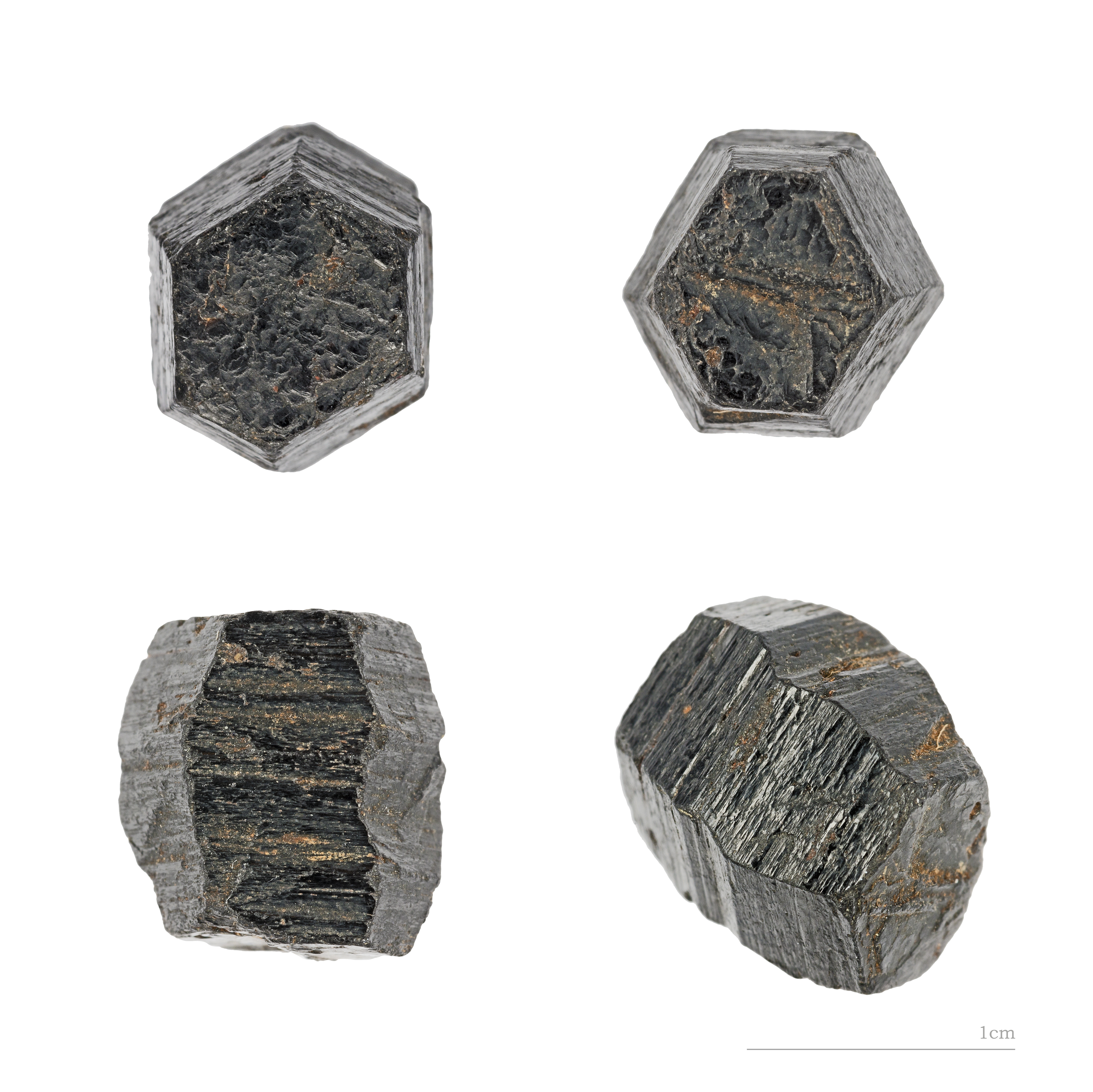
- Hibonite, 1.6 cm (0.63 in) sharp and lustrous crystal from Esiva eluvials, Maromby Commune, Amboasary District, Anosy (Fort Dauphin) Region, Tuléar (Toliara) Province, Madagascar

General
- Category: Oxide minerals
- Formula: (Ca,Ce)(Al,Ti,Mg)_{12}O_{19}
- IMA symbol: Hbn
- Strunz classification: 4.CC.45
- Crystal system: Hexagonal
- Crystal class: Dihexagonal dipyramidal (6/mmm); H-M symbol: (6/m 2/m 2/m)
- Space group: P6_{3}/mmc
- Unit cell: a = 5.56, c = 21.89 [Å]; Z = 2

Identification
- Color: Brownish black to black; reddish brown in thin fragments; blue in meteorite occurrence
- Crystal habit: Prismatic platy to steep pyramidal crystals
- Cleavage: {0001} good, {101̅0} parting
- Fracture: Subconchoidal
- Mohs scale hardness: 7 1/2–8
- Luster: Vitreous
- Streak: reddish brown
- Diaphaneity: Semitransparent
- Specific gravity: 3.84
- Optical properties: Uniaxial (-)
- Refractive index: n_{ω} = 1.807(2), n_{ε} = 1.79(1)
- Pleochroism: O = brownish gray; E = gray

Hibonite is a mineral with the chemical formula (Ca,Ce)(Al,Ti,Mg)_{12}O_{19}, occurring in various colours, with a hardness of 7.5–8.0 and a hexagonal crystal structure. It is rare, but is found in high-grade metamorphic rocks on Madagascar. Some presolar grains in primitive meteorites consist of hibonite. Hibonite also is a common mineral in the Ca-Al-rich inclusions found in some chondritic meteorites. Hibonite is closely related to hibonite-Fe (IMA 2009-027, (Fe,Mg)Al_{12}O_{19})) an alteration mineral from the Allende meteorite. Hibonites were among the first minerals to form as the disk of gas and dust swirling around the young sun cooled.

A very rare gem, hibonite was discovered in 1953 in Madagascar by Paul Hibon, a French prospector.

== Colour ==
Hibonite can vary in colour, from a bright blue, to green, to orange, to a nearly black deep brown. The colour is related to the degree of oxidation; meteoritic hibonite tends to be blue.

== See also ==
- Glossary of meteoritics
