= Charles & Colvard =

American jewelry company

Charles & Colvard, Ltd.
- Type: Public
- Traded as: Nasdaq: CTHR
- Industry: Gemstone Manufacturer/Jewelry
- Founded: 1995; 31 years ago
- Founder: Charles Eric Hunter
- Headquarters: Research Triangle Park, North Carolina, United States,
- Key people: Don O'Connell (CEO); Neal Ira Goldman (chairman); Clint J. Pete (CFO)
- Products: Moissanite
- Revenue: $30.8 million
- Number of employees: 60
- Website: charlesandcolvard.com

Charles & Colvard, Ltd., is a publicly traded American company that distributes and manufactures jewelry, founded in 1995 by Charles Eric Hunter under the name C3 Inc., and then run by his brother Jeff Hunter until 2000. The company changed its name to Charles & Colvard in 1999. The company employs 63 people full-time, and generated $32.4 million in revenue during the year ending June 30, 2019, up from $27.91 million in the previous year.

Charles & Covard was the first company to produce and sell synthetic moissanite, under U.S. patent US5723391 A, first filed by C3 Inc., North Carolina. Their gemstones are made from silicon carbide crystals, supplied under an exclusive agreement from Cree Inc. since 2014.

In June 2019 the company netted $10 million from a secondary public offering.

In March 2020, the company was notified that they were at risk of being delisted on NASDAQ, as their share price had been consistently below $1.

Don O'Connell was announced CEO in May 2020, taking over after Suzanne T. Miglucci's resignation. The announcement came days after reporting their quarterly earnings, which included a $5.3 million writeoff. O'Connell's base salary is $335,000, and Miglucci's was $278,000.

As part of the COVID-19 pandemic, the company received a $965,000 federally backed small business loan from Newtek Small Business Finance as part of the Paycheck Protection Program. WCNC highlighted the company, and publicly traded companies that received loans before privately held small businesses did. WCNC also noted some publicly traded companies had returned their loan amidst scrutiny. The company had furloughed about half of their employees on April 13, 2020. The company also has had a $5 million line of credit since 2018, which remains available.

Subsidiary companies and brands include 'Classic Moissanite', 'Forever Brilliant', 'Survivor Collection', 'Hearts & Arrows', 'Moissanite.com' and 'Lulu Avenue'.

In March 2026, Charles & Colvard filed for Chapter 11 bankruptcy protection after reporting staggering losses since 2023, primarily due to increased competition from jewelry retailers. In April 2026, the company entered an agreement to sell its assets to Van Lang Jewelry and Jewelry Design Partners for $1.5 million, which is due to close by July 7.
