= BPM 37093 =

White dwarf star in the constellation Centaurus

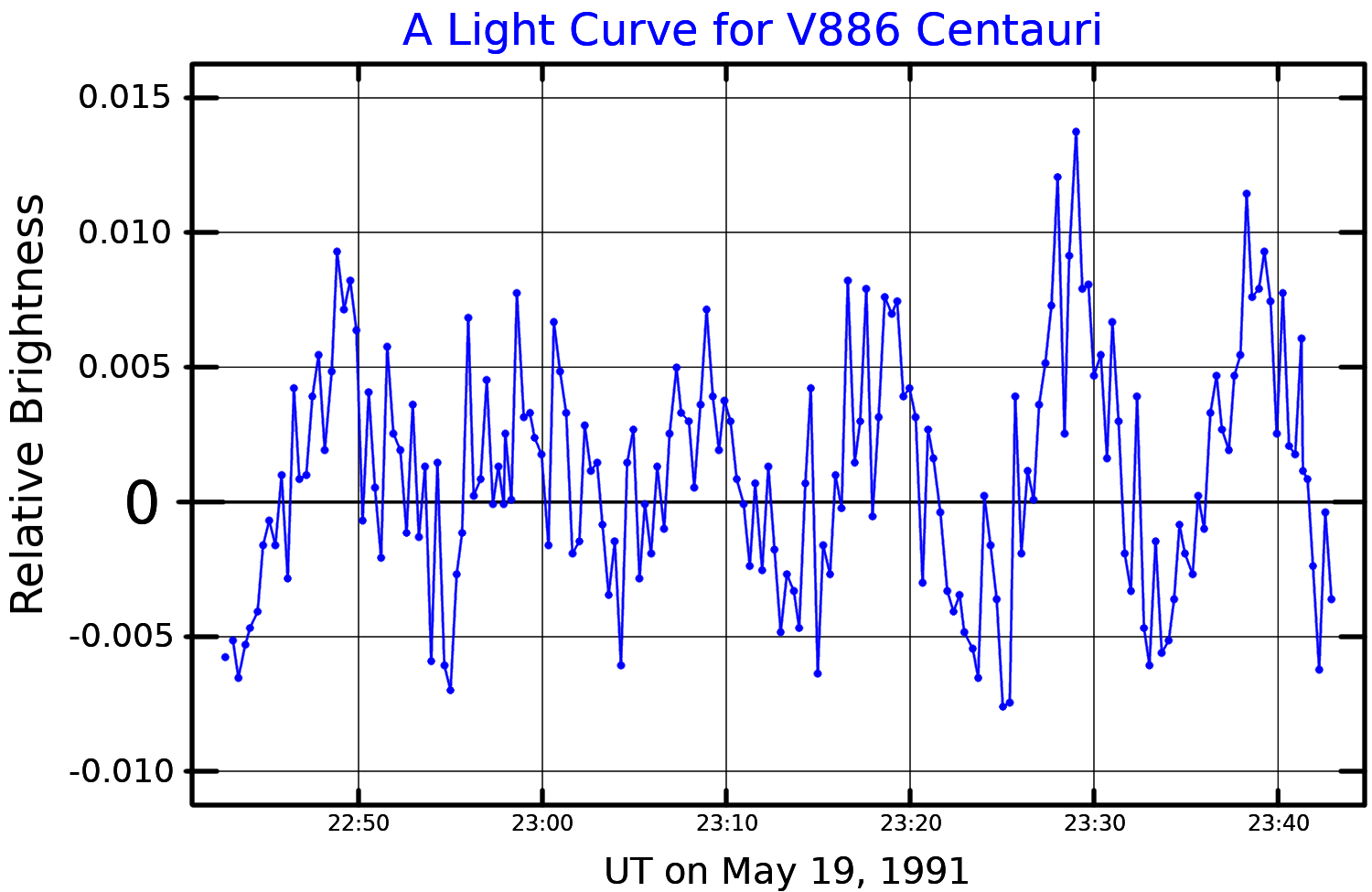
- A light curve for V886 Centauri, adapted from Kanaan et al. (1992)

Observation data Epoch J2000.0 Equinox ICRS
- Constellation: Centaurus
- Right ascension: 12^{h} 38^{m} 49.78112^{s}
- Declination: −49° 48′ 00.2195″
- Apparent magnitude (V): 14.0

Characteristics
- Evolutionary stage: white dwarf
- Spectral type: DAV4.4
- Variable type: DAV (ZZ Ceti)

Astrometry
Radial velocity (R_{v})	−12 km/s
Proper motion (μ)	RA: -557.111 mas/yr Dec.: -74.036 mas/yr
Parallax (π)	67.4058±0.0186 mas
Distance	48.39 ± 0.01 ly (14.836 ± 0.004 pc)

Details
Mass	1.160±0.014 M_{☉}
Radius	0.00583+0.00081 −0.00080 R_{☉}
Luminosity	5.62+0.13 −0.12×10^{−4} L_{☉}
Surface gravity (log g)	8.970±0.005 cgs
Temperature	11,650±40 K

Other designations
- V886 Cen, BPM 37093, GJ 2095, LFT 931, LHS 2594, LTT 4816, WD 1236-495

Database references
SIMBAD	data
ARICNS	data

BPM 37093 (V886 Centauri) is a variable white dwarf star of the DAV, or ZZ Ceti, type, with a hydrogen atmosphere and an unusually high mass of approximately 1.1 times the Sun's. It is 48 light-years (15 parsecs) from Earth in the constellation Centaurus and vibrates; these pulsations cause its luminosity to vary with a period of around 10 minutes. Like other white dwarfs, BPM 37093 is thought to be composed primarily of carbon and oxygen, which are created by thermonuclear fusion of helium nuclei in the triple-alpha process.

== Structure ==
In the 1960s, it was predicted that as a white dwarf cools, its material should crystallize, starting at the center. When a star pulsates, observing its pulsations gives information about its structure. BPM 37093 was first observed to be a pulsating variable in 1992, and in 1995 it was pointed out that this yielded a potential test of the crystallization theory. In 2004, Antonio Kanaan and a team of researchers of the Whole Earth Telescope estimated, on the basis of these asteroseismological observations, that approximately 90% of the mass of BPM 37093 had crystallized. Other work gives a crystallized mass fraction of between 32% and 82%. Any of these estimates would result in a total crystalline mass in excess of 5×10^{29} kilograms. As the white dwarf has a radius of 4,000 kilometres (2,500 mi), this means that the core of BPM 37093, nicknamed Lucy, is likely one of the largest diamonds in the local region of the universe.

Body-centered cubic lattice

Crystallization of the material of a white dwarf of this type is thought to result in a body-centered cubic lattice of carbon and/or oxygen nuclei, which are surrounded by a Fermi sea of electrons.

== Nickname and press coverage ==
- Since a diamond also consists of crystallized carbon, the star BPM 37093 has been nicknamed Lucy after the Beatles' hit Lucy in the Sky with Diamonds.

== In popular culture ==
- In John C. Wright's science fiction novel Count to a Trillion and its sequels, V886 Centauri is called the "Diamond Star", after the crystalline carbon core. In the story of the novel, it becomes the destination of the first human interstellar journey after it is discovered that the star, a ten-decillion-carat diamond of degenerate matter, is not matter at all, but antimatter. An alien artifact called "The Monument" is found orbiting it, which increases human knowledge of mathematics immensely.
- In Jim Jarmusch's 2013 film Only Lovers Left Alive, Tilda Swinton's character Eve tells Tom Hiddleston's character Adam about BPM 37093, describing it as a "diamond up there the size of a planet" that "emits the music of a gigantic gong".

== See also ==
- List of star extremes
- Extraterrestrial diamonds
- Cullinan Diamond, the largest diamond found on Earth
