= Hemolithin =

Protein claimed to be of extraterrestrial origin

- (iron and lithium-containing protein, possibly extraterrestrial)
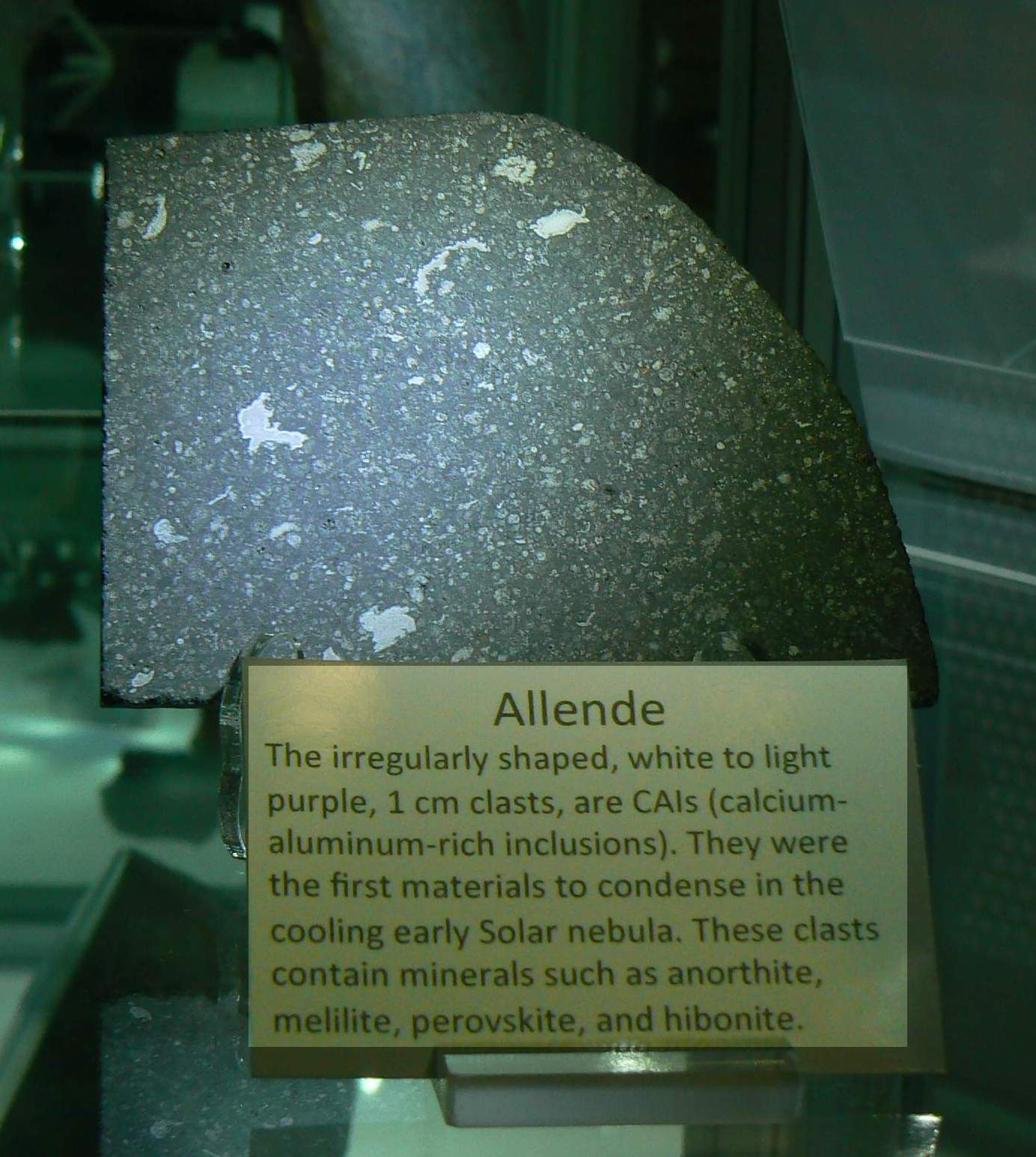
- Hemolithin was found in Acfer 086, an Allende meteorite similar to that pictured.
- Function: unknown, although possibly able to split water to hydroxyl and hydrogen moieties

Hemolithin (now known as hemoglycin) is a proposed protein containing iron and lithium, of extraterrestrial origin, according to an unpublished preprint. The result has not been published in any peer-reviewed scientific journal. The protein was purportedly found inside two CV3 meteorites, Allende and Acfer-086, by a team of scientists led by Harvard University biochemist Julie McGeoch. The report of the discovery was met with some skepticism and suggestions that the researchers had extrapolated too far from incomplete data.

== Sources ==
The detected hemolithin protein was reported to have been found inside two CV3 meteorites Allende and Acfer 086. Acfer-086, where the complete molecule was detected rather than fragments (Allende), was discovered in Agemour, Algeria, in 1990.

== Structure ==
According to the researchers' mass spectrometry, hemolithin is largely composed of glycine and hydroxyglycine amino acids. The researchers noted that the protein was related to "very high extraterrestrial" ratios of Deuterium/Hydrogen (D/H); such high D/H ratios are not found anywhere on Earth, but are "consistent with long-period comets" and suggest, as reported, "that the protein was formed in the proto-solar disc or perhaps even earlier, in interstellar molecular clouds that existed long before the Sun's birth".

A natural development of hemolithin may have started with glycine forming first, and then later linking with other glycine molecules into polymer chains, and later still, combining with iron and oxygen atoms. The iron and oxygen atoms reside at the end of the newly found molecule. The researchers speculate that the iron oxide grouping formed at the end of the molecule may be able to absorb photons, thereby enabling the molecule to split water (H_{2}O) into hydrogen and oxygen and, as a result, produce a source of energy that might be useful to the development of life.

Exobiologist and chemist Jeffrey Bada expressed concerns about the possible protein discovery commenting, "The main problem is the occurrence of hydroxyglycine, which, to my knowledge, has never before been reported in meteorites or in prebiotic experiments. Nor is it found in any proteins. ... Thus, this amino acid is a strange one to find in a meteorite, and I am highly suspicious of the results." Likewise, Lee Cronin of the University of Glasgow stated, "The structure makes no sense."

== History ==
Hemolithin is the name given to a protein molecule isolated from two CV3 meteorites, Allende and Acfer-086. Its deuterium to hydrogen ratio is 26 times terrestrial which is consistent with it having formed in an interstellar molecular cloud, or later in the protoplanetary disk at the start of the Solar System 4.567 billion years ago. The elements hydrogen, lithium, carbon, oxygen, nitrogen and iron that it is composed of, were all available for the first time 13 billion years ago after the first generation of massive stars ended in nucleosynthetic events.

The research leading to the discovery of Hemolithin started in 2007 when another protein, ATP synthase subunit C, one of the first to form on Earth, was observed to entrap water. That property being useful to chemistry before biochemistry on earth developed, theoretical enthalpy calculations on the condensation of amino acids were performed in gas phase space asking: "whether amino acids could polymerize to protein in space?" - they could, and their water of condensation aided their polymerization. This led to several manuscripts of isotope and mass information on Hemolithin.

A comment from the Harvard research leader on Hemolithin/Hemoglycin JEMMc – Hemolithin is now termed hemoglycin. Hemoglycin, a space polymer of glycine and iron has been extensively characterized and it does contain lithium in some samples. The research and now needs to be considered in the context of 4 areas of astronomy and planetary science: 1st in astronomy, the period between Pop III and Pop II stars, when the constituent elements of hemoglycin first formed even as early as 500 My into cosmic time. 2nd in molecular clouds and protoplanetary disks where the polymer is likely to form and function in accretion. Thus, the polymer could be a major player in solar system formation throughout the Universe. 3rd after in-fall to planets like Earth, where on Earth it could have kick-started the Great Oxygenation Event (GOE). 4th on exo-planets that evolve biochemistry like Earth, it could be asked whether the formation of DNA involves hemoglycin as a template. Guanine and cytosine nucleotide bases could form and bind to the 5 nm glycine rods of in-fall hemoglycin to start the coding of glycine.

Hemoglycin is not a biological molecule, being outside of biochemistry, that is, abiotic. It may have first formed 500 million years into cosmic time as a structure that could absorb photons from 0.2-15 μm, be available throughout the Universe, and provide energy to drive adjacent space chemistry. On its in-fall to exo-planets like Earth it could absorb solar ultraviolet and donate energy to early chemical systems. Hemoglycin could therefore be thought of as an abiotic absorber of light, a supplier of energy and an accretor of matter. Synthetic hemoglycin synthesis will be attempted in 2025 to aid acquisition of a refined x-ray diffraction set for its structure. Hemoglycin crystals from meteorites, and stromatolites, to date are fiber-like or multiple. A comparison of the MALDI mass spectrometry fragmentation patterns of synthetic and extracted hemoglycin will be informative.

== See also ==
- Earliest known life forms
- Evolutionary history of life
- Extraterrestrial: The First Sign of Intelligent Life Beyond Earth
- List of interstellar and circumstellar molecules
- Panspermia
