= Hemoglycin =

Space polymer claimed to be of extraterrestrial origin

- (Glycine-containing space polymer of amino acids found in meteorites)
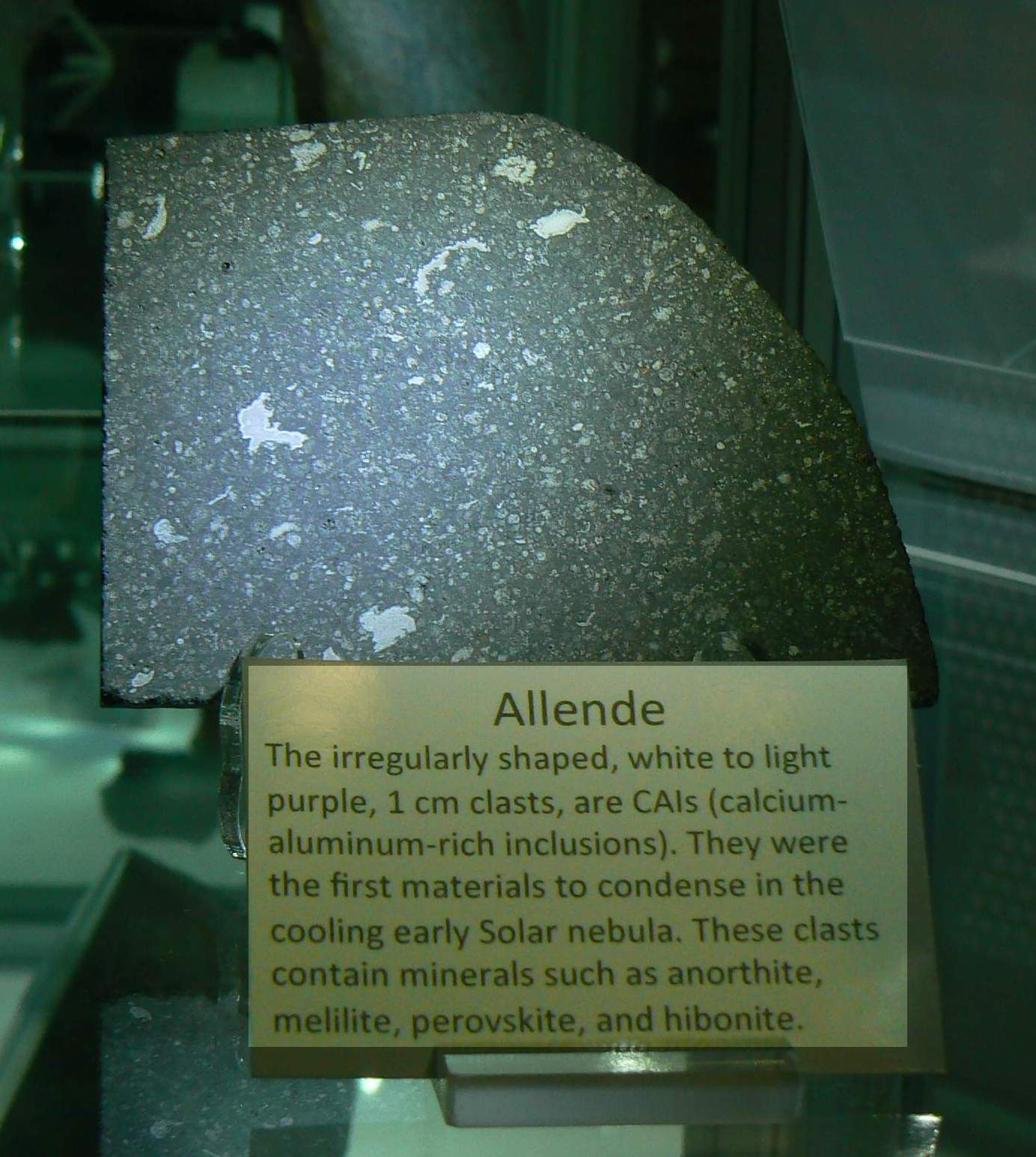
- Hemoglycin was found in Acfer 086, an Allende meteorite similar to that pictured.
- Function: unknown, although possibly able to split water to hydroxyl and hydrogen moieties

Hemoglycin (previously termed hemolithin) is a space polymer that is the first polymer of amino acids found in meteorites.

== Structure ==
Structural work has determined that its 1,494-dalton core unit (glycine_{18} / hydroxy-glycine_{4} / Fe_{2}O_{4}) contains iron, but not lithium, leading to the more general term hemoglycin for these molecules. The hemoglycin core contains a total of 22 glycine residues in an anti-parallel beta-sheet chain that is terminated at each end by an iron atom plus two oxygens. Four of these glycine residues are oxidized to hydroxy-glycine with hydroxy groups (−OH) on the alpha carbon. This structure was determined by mass spectrometry of meteoritic solvent extracts and has been confirmed in X-ray scattering by crystals of hemoglycin, and also by optical absorption. Crystals show a 480 nm characteristic absorption that can only exist when hydroxy-glycine residues have R chirality and are C-terminal bonded to iron.

== History ==
Because hemoglycin has now been found to be the dominant polymer of amino acids in 6 different meteorites (Allende, Acfer 086, Efremovka, Kaba, Orgueil and Sutter's Mill), each time with the same structure, it has been proposed that it is produced by a process of template replication. The measured 480 nm absorbance is larger than expected for a racemic distribution of R and S chirality in the hydroxy-glycine residues, indicating an R chirality excess in the polymer. Modeling of template replication that is assumed to depend on 480 nm absorption leads to an excess of R chirality and thus is consistent with this finding.

== Significance ==
Hemoglycin is an abiotic molecule that forms in molecular clouds which go on to become protoplanetary disks, long before biochemistry on exoplanets like Earth might begin. Hemoglycin, via its glycine, could seed an exoplanet to support early biochemistry, but its main function appears to be the accretion of matter via formation of an extensive low-density lattice in space in a protoplanetary disk.

Besides being present in carbonaceous meteorites, hemoglycin has also been extracted and crystallized from a fossil stromatolite that formed on Earth 2.1 billion years ago. Potentially, this fossil hemoglycin was delivered to Earth during the Late Heavy Bombardment (LHB), as the hemoglycin in the fossil has extraterrestrial isotopes similar to that in meteorites. The polymer on the precambrian Earth could have driven the Great Oxygenation Event (GOE) beginning 2.4 Gya by splitting water in response to ultraviolet irradiation. Also, it could have provided an energy source to early biochemistry and/or it could have simply delivered a source of polymer glycine.

A comment from the Harvard research leader on Hemoglycin JEMMc - Hemoglycin, a space polymer of glycine and iron has been extensively characterized [1-11] and now needs to be considered in the context of 4 areas of astronomy and planetary science: 1st in astronomy, the period between Pop III and Pop II stars, when the constituent elements of hemoglycin first formed even as early as 500My into cosmic time [1]. 2nd in molecular clouds and protoplanetary disks where the polymer is likely to form and function in accretion [6,9,10]. Thus, the polymer could be a major player in solar system formation throughout the Universe. 3rd after in-fall to planets like Earth, where on Earth it could have kick-started "The Great Oxygenation Event" (GOE) [9]. 4th on exo-planets that evolve biochemistry like Earth, it could be asked whether the formation of DNA involves hemoglycin as a template. Guanine and cytosine nucleotide bases could form and bind to the 5 nm glycine rods of in-fall hemoglycin to start the coding of glycine [12].

Hemoglycin is not a biological molecule, being outside of biochemistry, that is, abiotic. It may have first formed 500 million years into cosmic time as a structure that could absorb photons from 0.2-15 μm [7,8,9,10], be available throughout the Universe, and provide energy to drive adjacent space chemistry. On its in-fall to exo-planets like Earth it could absorb solar ultraviolet and donate energy to early chemical systems. Hemoglycin could therefore be thought of as an abiotic absorber of light, a supplier of energy and an accretor of matter. Synthetic hemoglycin synthesis will be attempted in 2025 to aid acquisition of a refined x-ray diffraction set for its structure. Hemoglycin crystals from meteorites, and stromatolites, to date are fiber-like or multiple [6,8,9]. A comparison of the MALDI mass spectrometry fragmentation patterns [5,11] of synthetic and extracted hemoglycin will be informative.

1. McGeoch J. E. M. and McGeoch M. W. (2014) Polymer Amide as an Early Topology. PLoS ONE 9(7): e103036. https://journals.plos.org/plosone/article?id=10.1371/journal.pone.0103036
2. McGeoch J. E. M. and McGeoch M. W. (2015) Polymer amide in the Allende and Murchison meteorites. Meteoritics & Planetary Science 50, Nr12 1971-1983. https://onlinelibrary.wiley.com/doi/10.1111/maps.12558
3. McGeoch J. E. M. and McGeoch M. W. (2017) A 4641Da polymer of amino acids in Acfer-086 and Allende meteorites. https://arxiv.org/pdf/1707.09080.pdf
4. McGeoch M. W., Šamoril T., Zapotok D. and McGeoch J. E. M. (2018) Polymer amide as a carrier of 15N in Allende and Acfer 086 meteorites. https://arxiv.org/abs/1811.06578.
5. McGeoch M. W., Dikler S. and McGeoch J. E. M. (2021) Meteoritic Proteins with Glycine, Iron and Lithium https://arxiv.org/abs/2102.10700. [physics.chem-ph]
6. McGeoch J. E. M. and McGeoch M.W. (2021) Structural Organization of Space Polymers. Physics of Fluids 33, 6, June 29. https://aip.scitation.org/doi/10.1063/5.0054860.
7. McGeoch J. E. M. and McGeoch M. W. (2022) Chiral 480 nm absorption in the hemoglycin space polymer: a possible link to replication. Sci. Rept. 12 16198 DOI: 10.1038/s41598-022-21043-4 License CC BY 4.0
8. McGeoch M. W., Owen R., Jaho S. and McGeoch J. E. M. (2023) Hemoglycin visible fluorescence induced by X-rays. J. Chem. Phys. 158, 114901 (2023); https://doi.org/10.1063/5.0143945
9. McGeoch J. E. M., Frommelt A. J., Owen R., Cinque G., McClelland A., Lageson D. and McGeoch M. W. (2024) Fossil and present-day stromatolite ooids contain a meteoritic polymer of glycine and iron. Int. J. Astrobiology 23, e20, 1-21 https://doi.org/10.1017/S1473550424000168 & arXiv:2309.17195 [physics.geo-ph].
10. McGeoch J. E. M. and McGeoch M. W. (2024) Polymer amide as a source of the cosmic 6.2 micron emission and absorption arXiv:2309.14914 [astro-ph.GA]. Mon. Not. Roy. Astron. Soc. 530, 1163-1170. DOI: https://doi.org/10.1093/mnras/stae756.
11. McGeoch J. E. M and McGeoch M. W. (2024) Sea foam contains hemoglycin from cosmic dust. RSC Advances, 2024, 14, 36919 – 36929. https://doi.org/10.1039/d4ra06881e
12. Lei L. and Burton Z. F. (2021) Evolution of the genetic code, Transcription, 12:1, 28-53, DOI: 10.1080/21541264.2021.1927652

== See also ==
- Ancient protein
- Bubble (physics)
- Earliest known life forms
- Evolutionary history of life
- Extraterrestrial: The First Sign of Intelligent Life Beyond Earth
- List of interstellar and circumstellar molecules
- Panspermia
- Protein
