= Interstellar oxygen =

Oxygen found in the interstellar medium

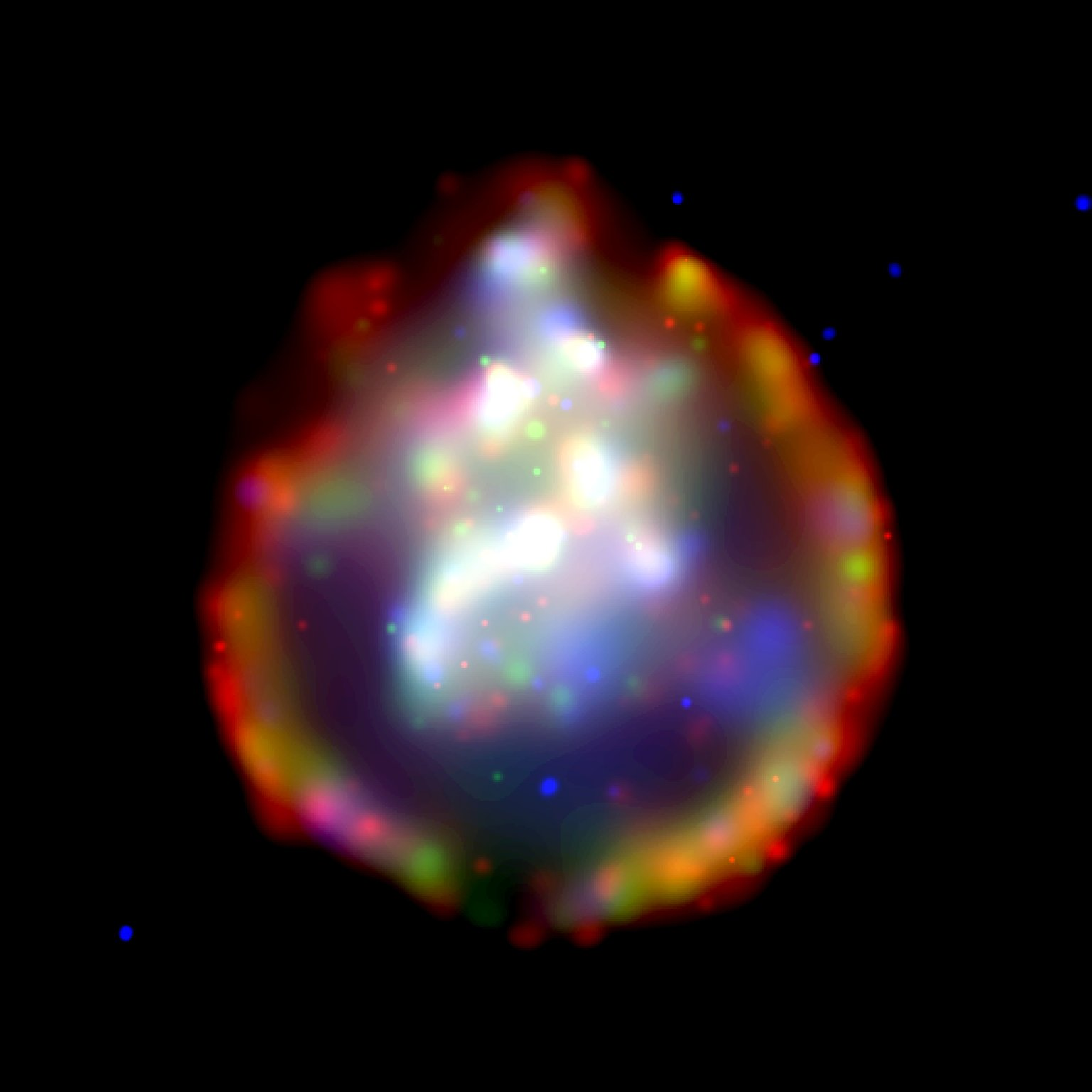
SN 0103-72.6, an oxygen-rich supernova remnant

Interstellar oxygen refers to the presence of the element oxygen (atomic or molecular) found in interstellar space. Oxygen is common, being the third most abundant element in the universe after hydrogen and helium. It is often found as neutral or ionized atomic gas and as a constituent of molecular gas, volatile ices, and minerals in dust. Interstellar oxygen in dust is primarily found in the form of silicates. These molecules are created inside evolved stars which then eject it into space when they start to shed their outer layers. They are then incorporated into large molecular clouds that collapse to form star systems like the Solar System.

== Missing oxygen ==
The total amount of oxygen in the interstellar medium of the Milky Way galaxy is mostly unknown but studies have shown that there seems to be a depletion of oxygen. This missing oxygen problem is not solved and has been dubbed the ‘oxygen crisis’ or ‘O-crisis’. This problem can not be solved with the combined contributions of carbon monoxide, ices, and silicate and oxide dust. It's possible that a significant fraction of the missing oxygen is found in organic carbonate solids.

The Sun seems to have a slight overabundance of oxygen.

== Scientific importance ==
The study of oxygen located in interstellar space is important for a variety of reasons. Oxygen is abundant in the Solar System which it got from the Solar nebula which collapsed to form the Solar System.

The thermal or photolytic decomposition of carbonates may also form carbon dioxide in the interstellar medium.
