= Panethite =

Rare mineral

General
- Category: Phosphate minerals
- Formula: (Na,Ca)_{2}(Mg,Fe)_{2}(PO_{4})_{2}
- IMA symbol: Pne
- Strunz classification: 8.AC.65
- Crystal system: Monoclinic
- Crystal class: Prismatic (2/m) (same H-M symbol)
- Space group: P2_{1}/n

Identification
- Color: Amber
- Twinning: Simple twinning
- Specific gravity: 2.90-3.0
- Optical properties: Biaxial(-)
- Refractive index: α=1.567, β=1.576, γ = 1.579 all ±0.001
- Birefringence: +0.009 (B-G interval)

Panethite, chemical formula (Na,Ca)_{2}(Mg,Fe)_{2}(PO_{4})_{2}, is a rare phosphate mineral that was only found in one meteorite on Earth. It was originally found in the Dayton meteorite in Ohio. It is classified as H-M symbol (2/m) with space group of P2_{1}/n. It is amber in color. It was named in the honor of Friedrich Adolf Paneth (1887–1958), a German chemist who made many contributions toward the discovery of the origin of the universe, and especially studies of meteorites.

== Structure ==
Using X-ray diffraction, the unit cell and the space group parameters were determined. The strongest lines of the X-ray were 5.10(6), 3.236(5), 3.007(10), 2.749, 2.710(7) (American Mineralogist, 509). But the error of the cell lengths were relatively high due to twinning and some disorder in the grains examined. Panethite has a monoclinic crystal system with a0=10.18 ±0.01Å, b0=14.90 ±0.02Å, c0=25.87 ±0.03Å and β =91.1˚, and its space group P2_{1}/n. Within the error that accompanied the microprobe analysis, the X-ray density was found to be 2.99g/ml.

== Properties ==
Both brianite and panethite were clear and transparent with no crystal faces; and neither present any discernible cleavage. Panethite is a biaxial negative, pale amber in its color and the estimated 2V was approximated to be 51˚. The refractive indices are α=1.567, β=1.576, γ = 1.579 all ±0.001 (Fuchs, 1967). Even though panethite lacks the lamellar structure that brianite shows, panethite shows simple twinning. The higher refractive indices along with the lamellae structure of brianite help us to distinguish these two minerals apart under the microscope. The specific gravity of panethite was between 2.90 and 3.0. Both minerals were insoluble in water. Panethite and brianite are the minerals known to have the greatest amount of sodium content in meteorites (Fuchs, 1967).

Panethite was named after the then director of the Max Planck Institute for Chemistry, Mainz, Germany, Friedrich Adolf Paneth (1887-1958).

=== See also ===
- Glossary of meteoritics
