= Roaldite =

Nitride mineral

General
- Category: Minerals
- Formula: (Fe,Ni)>_{4}N
- IMA symbol: Roa
- Strunz classification: 1.BC.05
- Dana classification: 1.1.18.2
- Crystal system: Cubic
- Crystal class: Hextetrahedral (4̅3m); H–M Symbol: (4̅ 3m)
- Space group: P4̅3m (no. 215)
- Unit cell: a = 3.79 Å; Z = 1

Identification
- Colour: Tin-white
- Crystal habit: Platelets in kamacite
- Mohs scale hardness: 5.5-6.5
- Lustre: Metallic
- Diaphaneity: Opaque
- Specific gravity: 7.21
- Optical properties: Isotropic

Roaldite is a rare meteorite mineral containing iron, nickel and nitrogen. Its chemical formula is (Fe,Ni)_{4}N.

It was first described in 1981 for an occurrence in the Youngedin meteorite, Avon, Western Australia. It was named after Roald Norbach Nielsen (born 1928), a Danish expert in electron microprobe. The mineral has also been reported from the Jerslev meteorite, Sjaelland, Denmark, and the Canyon Diablo meteorite of Meteor Crater in Arizona.

== See also ==
- Glossary of meteoritics
