= Calcium–aluminium-rich inclusion =

Asteroid with an inclusion with high quantities of calcium and aluminium

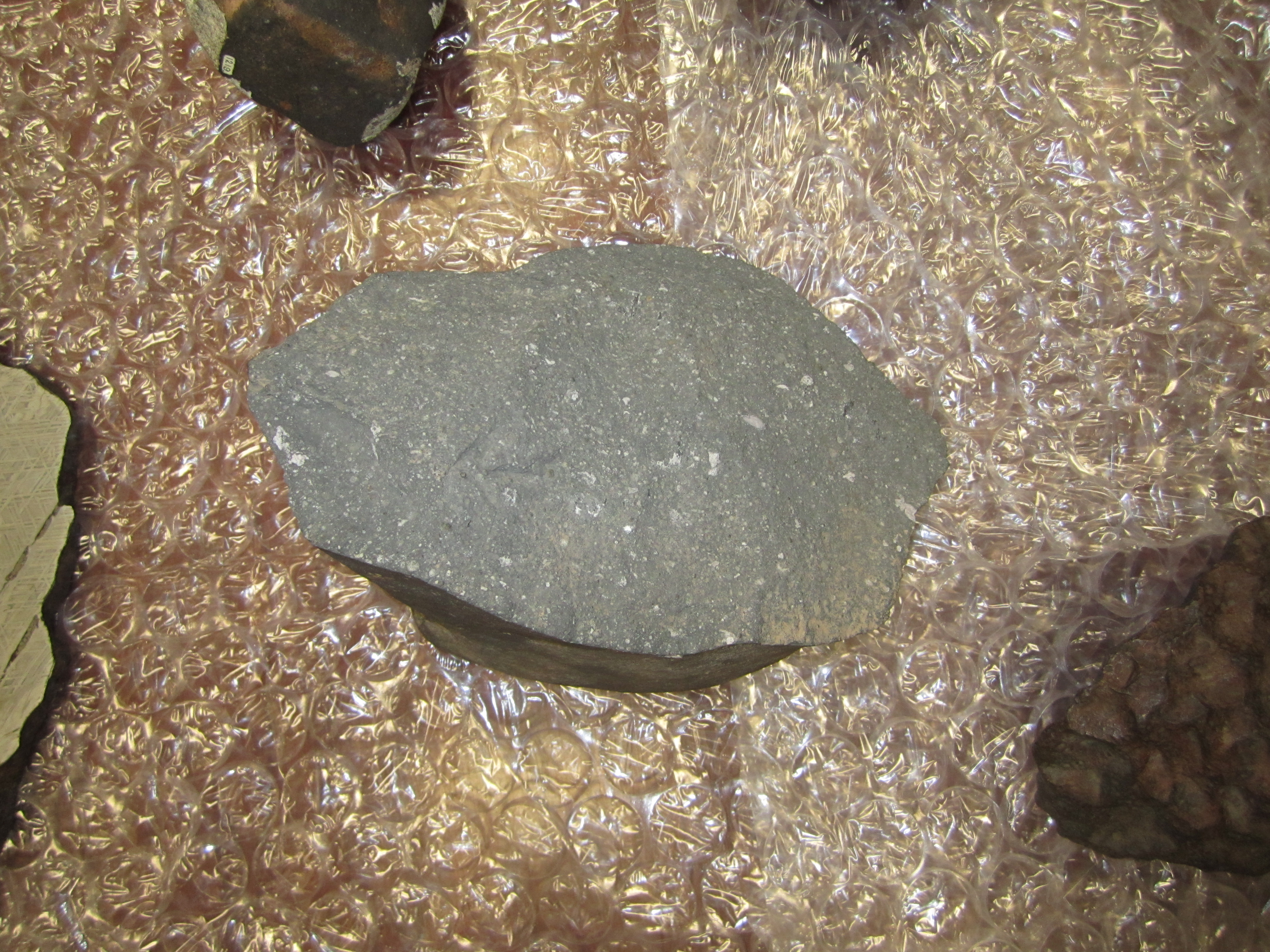
Chondrite meteorite with calcium–aluminium-rich inclusions seen as white specks

A calcium–aluminium-rich inclusion or Ca–Al-rich inclusion (CAI) is a submillimeter- to centimeter-sized light-colored calcium- and aluminium-rich inclusion found in carbonaceous chondrite meteorites. The first high-precision radiometric datings of CAIs involved four samples examined through the Pb–Pb chronometer, yielding a weighted mean age of 4567.30 ± 0.16 Ma. Subsequent studies including additional samples suggest a slightly older age of 4568.3 ± 0.7 Ma to rectify inconsistencies regarding Hf–W and Al–Mg chronometry methods. As CAIs are the oldest dated solids, except the presolar grains, this age is commonly used to define the age of the Solar System.

== Description ==
CAIs consist of minerals that are among the first solids condensed from the cooling protoplanetary disk. They are thought to have formed as fine-grained condensates from a high temperature (>1300 K) gas that existed in the protoplanetary disk at early stages of Solar System formations. Some of them were probably remelted later resulting in distinct coarser textures. The most common and characteristic minerals in CAIs include anorthite, melilite, perovskite, aluminous spinel, hibonite, calcic pyroxene, and forsterite-rich olivine. The first CAI to be described in a meteorite was published in a paper in 1968, by Mireille Christophe Michel-Lévy. She had found an unusual chondrule in the Vigarano meteorite, and on the basis of her analysis declared that it was a "primary silico-alumino-calcic condensate".

Using the lead-lead isotope chronometer ('Pb–Pb dating'), the absolute age of four CAIs have been calculated. They yield a weighted mean age of 4567.30 ± 0.16 Myr, which is often interpreted as representing the beginning of the formation of the planetary system (so-called 'CAI time-zero). It is of note that all four Pb-Pb dated CAIs come from the same group of meteorite (CV chondrites).

== See also ==
- Glossary of meteoritics

== Bibliography ==
- MacPherson, G. J. (2004) "Calcium-aluminum-rich inclusions in chondritic meteorites." In Treatise on Geochemistry, Volume I, Meteorites, Comets, and Planets, A. M. Davis, edt., Elsevier, New York, pp. 201–246. ISBN 0-08-043751-6
- Krot, A. N. (September 2002) "Dating the Earliest Solids in our Solar System". Planetary Science Research Discoveries. http://www.psrd.hawaii.edu/Sept02/isotopicAges.html
- Shukolyukov A., Lugmair G.W. (2002) "Chronology of Asteroid Accretion and Differentiation", pp. 687–695, in Asteroids III, Bottke W.F., Cellino A., Paolicchi P., Binzel R.P., eds., University of Arizona Press (2002), ISBN 0-8165-2281-2
