= Brianite =

Mineral found in meteorites

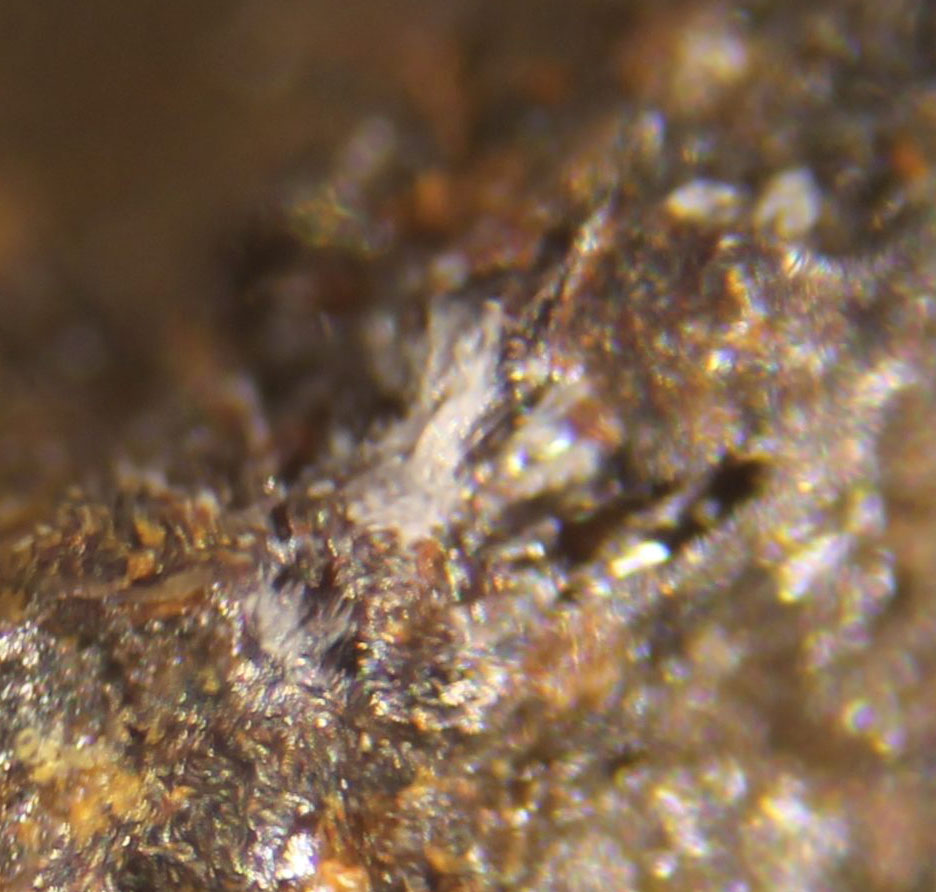
- Small white microcrystals of brianite from the Dayton meteorite

General
- Category: Phosphate minerals
- Formula: Na_{2}CaMg(PO_{4})_{2}
- IMA symbol: Bne
- Strunz classification: 8.AC.30
- Crystal system: Monoclinic
- Crystal class: Prismatic (2/m) (same H-M symbol)
- Space group: P2_{1}/a
- Unit cell: a = 13.36 Å, b = 5.23 Å, c = 9.13 Å, β = 91.2°; Z = 4

Identification
- Color: Colorless
- Crystal habit: Anhedral grains with lamellar structure visible under polarized light
- Twinning: Polysynthetic on {100}
- Mohs scale hardness: 4-5
- Luster: Vitreous
- Diaphaneity: Transparent
- Specific gravity: 3.0-3.1
- Optical properties: biaxial (-)
- Refractive index: n_{α} = 1.598, n_{β} = 1.605, n_{γ} = 1.608
- Birefringence: 0.010
- 2V angle: 63° to 65°
- Extinction: 2 to 3° from lamellae

Brianite is a phosphate mineral with the chemical formula Na_{2}CaMg(PO_{4})_{2}. It was first identified in an iron meteorite. This mineral is named after Brian Harold Mason (1917–2009), a pioneer in meteoritics.

It was first reported from the Dayton meteorite in Montgomery County, Ohio in 1966. It occurs in phosphate nodules within the meteorite. Associated minerals include: panethite, whitlockite, albite, enstatite, schreibersite, kamacite, taenite, graphite, sphalerite and troilite.

== See also ==
- Glossary of meteoritics
