= Moissanite =

Silicon carbide mineral

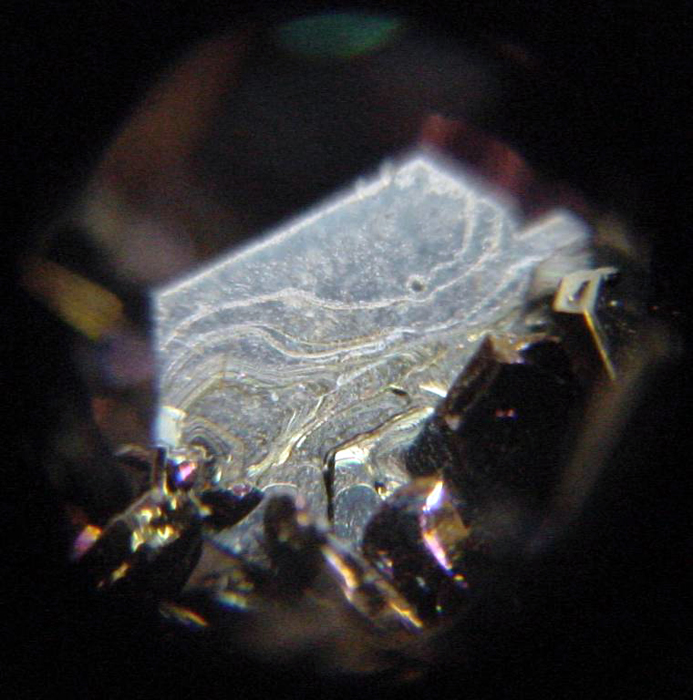

General
- Category: Mineral species
- Formula: SiC
- IMA symbol: Moi
- Strunz classification: 1.DA.05
- Crystal system: 6H polytype, most common: hexagonal
- Crystal class: 6H polytype: dihexagonal pyramidal (6mm); H-M symbol: (6mm)
- Space group: 6H polytype: P6_{3}mc

Identification
- Color: Colorless, green, yellow
- Crystal habit: Generally found as inclusions in other minerals
- Cleavage: (0001) indistinct
- Fracture: Conchoidal – fractures developed in brittle materials characterized by smoothly curving surfaces, e.g., quartz
- Mohs scale hardness: ~9.5
- Luster: Adamantine to metallic
- Streak: Greenish gray
- Diaphaneity: Transparent
- Specific gravity: 3.218–3.22
- Refractive index: n_{ω} = 2.654 n_{ε} = 2.967
- Birefringence: 0.313 (6H form)
- Dispersion: 0.104
- Ultraviolet fluorescence: Orange-red
- Melting point: 2730 °C (decomposes)
- Solubility: None
- Other characteristics: Not radioactive, diamagnetic

Moissanite (/ˈmɔɪsəˌnaɪt/) is naturally occurring silicon carbide and its various crystalline polymorphs. It has the chemical formula SiC and is a rare mineral, discovered by the French chemist Henri Moissan in 1893. Silicon carbide or moissanite is useful for commercial and industrial applications due to its hardness, optical properties, and thermal conductivity.

== Background ==
The mineral moissanite was discovered by Henri Moissan while examining rock samples from what is now called Meteor Crater located near Canyon Diablo, Arizona, US in 1893. At first, he mistakenly identified the crystals as diamonds, but in 1904 he identified the crystals as silicon carbide. Artificial silicon carbide had been synthesized in the lab by Edward G. Acheson in 1891, just two years before Moissan's discovery.

The mineral form of silicon carbide was named in honor of Moissan later on in his life.

== Geological occurrence ==
In its natural form, moissanite remains very rare. Until the 1950s, no source for moissanite other than as presolar grains in carbonaceous chondrite meteorites had been encountered. Then, in 1958, moissanite was found in the Green River Formation in Wyoming, US and, the following year, as inclusions in the ultramafic rock kimberlite from a diamond mine in Yakutia in the Russian Far East. Yet the existence of moissanite in nature was questioned as late as 1986 by the American geologist Charles Milton.

Discoveries show that it occurs naturally as inclusions in diamonds, xenoliths, and such other ultramafic rock such as lamproite.

== Meteorites ==
Analysis of silicon carbide grains found in the Murchison meteorite has revealed anomalous isotopic ratios of carbon and silicon, indicating an extraterrestrial origin from outside the Solar System. 99% of these silicon carbide grains originate around carbon-rich asymptotic giant branch stars. Silicon carbide is commonly found around these stars, as deduced from their infrared spectra. The discovery of silicon carbide in the Canyon Diablo meteorite and other places was delayed for a long time as carborundum (SiC) contamination had occurred from man-made abrasive tools.

== Physical properties ==
The crystalline structure is held together with strong covalent bonding similar to those in diamonds, that allows moissanite to withstand high pressures up to 52.1 gigapascals. Colors vary widely and are graded from D to K range on the diamond color grading scale.

== Sources ==
All applications of silicon carbide today use synthetic material, as the natural material is very scarce.

Swedish chemist Jöns Jacob Berzelius proposed in 1824 that a silicon-carbon bond might exist in nature (Berzelius 1824). In 1891, American chemist Edward Goodrich Acheson produced viable minerals that could substitute for diamond as an abrasive and cutting material. Moissanite has a hardness just below that of diamond, comparable with those of cubic boron nitride and boron. Pure synthetic moissanite can also be made from thermal decomposition of the preceramic polymer poly(methylsilyne), requiring no binding matrix such as cobalt metal powder.

Certain forms of single-crystalline silicon carbide have been used for the fabrication of high-performance semiconductor devices. As natural sources of silicon carbide are rare, and only certain atomic arrangements are useful for gemological applications, North Carolina–based Cree Research, Inc., founded in 1987, developed a commercial process for producing large single crystals of silicon carbide. Cree is the world leader in the growth of single crystal silicon carbide, used mostly for electronics.

In 1995 C3 Inc., a company helmed by Charles Eric Hunter, formed Charles & Colvard to market gem quality moissanite. Charles & Colvard was the first company to produce and sell synthetic moissanite under U.S. patent US5723391 A, first filed by C3 Inc. in North Carolina.

== Applications ==
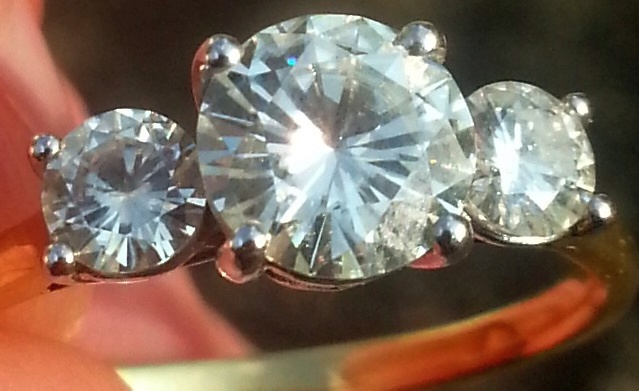
A moissanite engagement ring

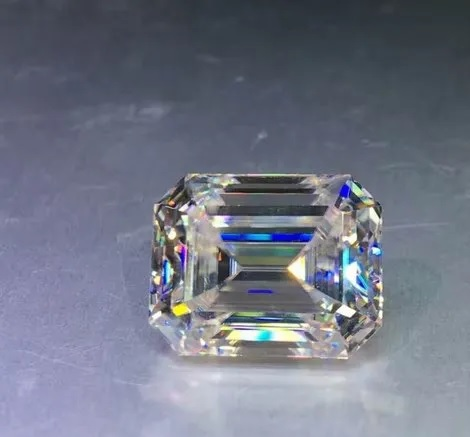
Moissanite: emerald cut

Moissanite was introduced to the jewelry market as a diamond alternative in 1998 after Charles & Colvard (formerly known as C3 Inc.) received patents to create and market lab-grown silicon carbide gemstones, becoming the first firm to do so. By 2018 all patents on the original process world-wide had expired. As of 1998, Charles & Colvard makes and distributes moissanite jewelry and loose gems under the trademarks Forever One, Forever Brilliant, and Forever Classic. Other manufacturers market silicon carbide gemstones under trademarked names such as Amora.

On the Mohs scale of mineral hardness (with diamond as the upper extreme, 10) moissanite is rated as 9.5. As a diamond alternative, Moissanite has some optical properties exceeding those of diamond. It is marketed as a lower price alternative to diamond that does not involve the expensive mining practices used for the extraction of natural diamonds. As some of its properties are quite similar to diamond, moissanite may be used as counterfeit diamond. Testing equipment based on measuring thermal conductivity in particular may give results similar to diamond. In contrast to diamond, moissanite exhibits a thermochromism, such that heating it gradually will cause it to temporarily change color, starting at around 65 °C (150 °F). A more practical test is a measurement of electrical conductivity, which will show higher values for moissanite. Moissanite is birefringent (i.e., light sent through the material splits into separate beams that depend on the source polarization), which can be easily seen, and diamond is not.

Because of its hardness, it can be used in high-pressure experiments, as a replacement for diamond (see Diamond anvil cell). Since large diamonds are usually too expensive to be used as anvils, moissanite is more often used in large-volume experiments. Synthetic moissanite is also interesting for electronic and thermal applications because its thermal conductivity is similar to that of diamond. High power silicon carbide electronic devices are expected to find use in the design of protection circuits used for motors, actuators, and energy storage or pulse power systems.

Silicon carbide is a mainstream semiconductor for high-power and high-temperature electronics. Commercial SiC power devices first entered mass production in the early 2000s with SiC Schottky barrier diodes, followed by SiC MOSFETs in the 2010s. Relative to silicon devices, SiC offers a wider bandgap, higher critical electric field, and superior thermal conductivity, enabling lower switching and conduction losses, higher operating temperatures, and operation at higher voltages and frequencies. By the 2010s–2020s, SiC MOSFETs and diodes were widely adopted in photovoltaic inverters, industrial motor drives, onboard chargers, and electric-vehicle traction inverters, among other systems, with reviews identifying the shift to SiC as a major inflection in power-electronic design.

It also exhibits thermoluminescence, making it useful in radiation dosimetry.

== See also ==
- Charles & Colvard
- Cubic zirconia
- Diamond
- Engagement ring
- Fair trade
- Glossary of meteoritics
