= Panguite =

Oxide mineral

General
- Category: Oxide mineral
- Formula: (Ti^{4+},Sc,Al,Mg,Zr,Ca)_{1.8}O_{3}
- IMA symbol: Pgu
- Crystal system: Orthorhombic
- Crystal class: Dipyramidal (mmm); H-M symbol: (2/m 2/m 2/m)
- Space group: Pbca
- Unit cell: a = 9.781(1) Å, b = 9.778(2) Å, c = 9.815(1) Å; Z = 16

Identification
- Crystal habit: Microscopic inclusion
- Specific gravity: 3.746 (calculated)

Panguite is a type of titanium oxide mineral first discovered as an inclusion within the Allende meteorite, and first described in 2012.

The hitherto unknown meteorite mineral was named for the ancient Chinese god Pan Gu, the creator of the world through the separation of yin (earth) from yang (sky).

== Composition ==
The mineral's chemical formula is (Ti^{4+},Sc,Al,Mg,Zr,Ca)_{1.8}O_{3}. The elements found in it are titanium, scandium, aluminium, magnesium, zirconium, calcium, and oxygen. Samples from the meteorite include some which are zirconium rich. The mineral was found in conjunction with the already identified mineral davisite, within an olivine aggregate.

== Origin and properties ==
Panguite is in a class of refractory minerals that formed under the high temperatures and extremely varied pressures present in the early Solar System, up to 4.5 billion years ago. This makes panguite one of the oldest minerals in the Solar System. Zirconium is a key element in determining conditions prior to and during the Solar System's formation.

== Discovery ==
Chi Ma, director of the Geological and Planetary Sciences division's Analytical Facility at the California Institute of Technology was the lead author of its first peer-reviewed article, published in American Mineralogist. Ma has been leading a nano mineralogy investigation, since 2007, of primitive meteorites, including the well studied Allende meteorite. The mineral was first described in a paper submitted to the 42nd annual Lunar and Planetary Science Conference in 2011.

== See also ==
- Glossary of meteoritics
