= Presolar grains =

Very old dust in space

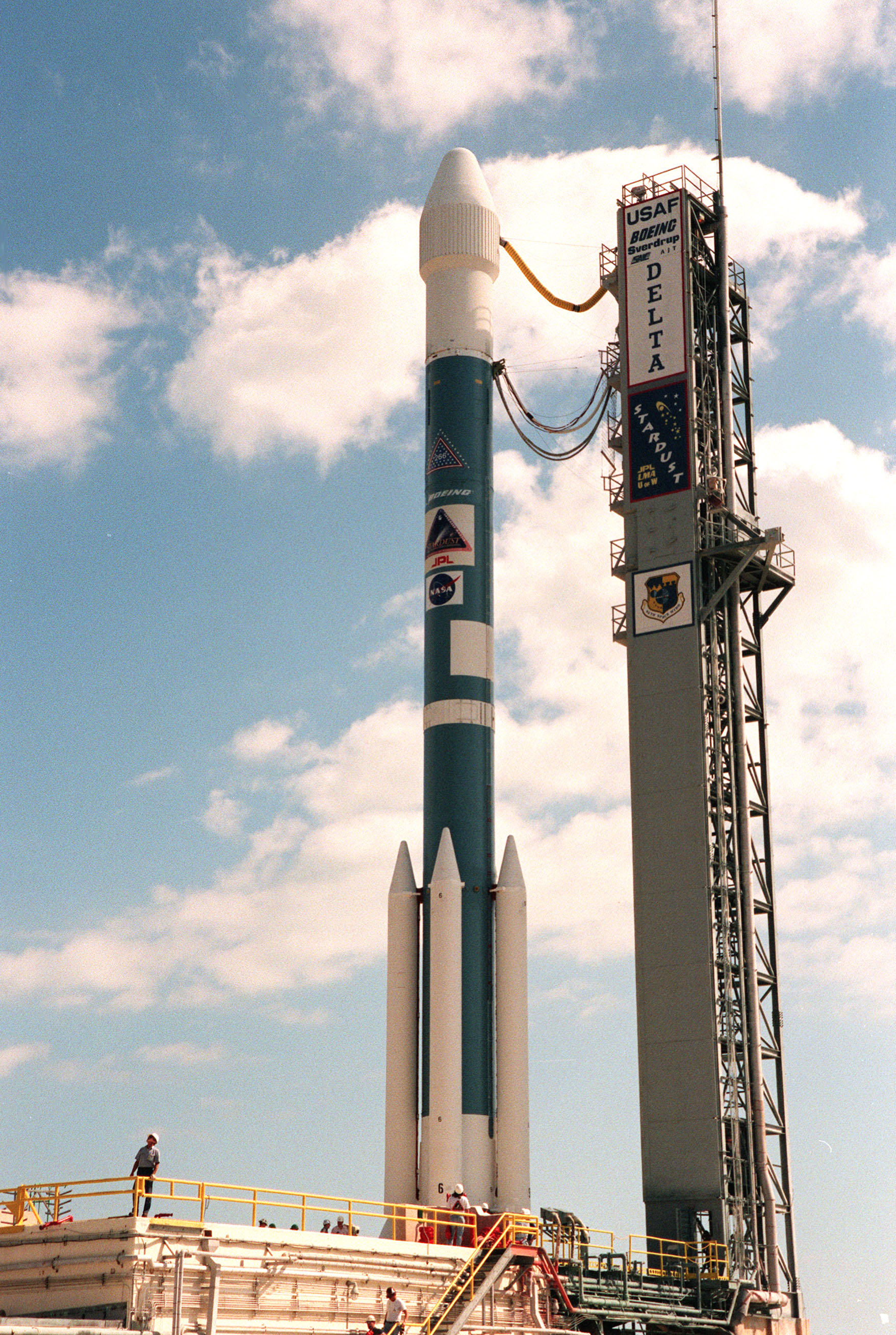
Boeing Delta II rocket carrying the Stardust spacecraft waiting for launch. Stardust had a close encounter with the comet Wild 2 in January 2004 and also collected interstellar dust containing presolar interstellar grains.

Presolar grains are any solid material formed before the coalescence of the Sun, the star at the center of the Solar System. This material is most frequently encountered as tiny grains incorporated whole into asteroids and comets. Presolar grains formed within the outflow of cooling gases from stars that predate the Sun, i.e., stars that came into being earlier than 4.6 billion years ago.

The stellar nucleosynthesis that took place within these stars lent distinct isotopic signatures to presolar grains, aiding their identification. These isotopic signatures often permit the identification of specific astrophysical nuclear processes different from any that have ever occurred in the Sun, proving the presolar origin of any grains bearing these isotopic ratios.

The study of presolar grains is the domain of cosmochemistry and meteoritics.

== Terminology ==
Presolar grains are individual solid grains that condensed around distant stars or their novae or supernovae outflows, which were accreted in the early solar nebula and remain in relatively unaltered chondritic meteorites. As they were accreted before the formation of the Solar System, they must be presolar. Presolar grains also exist in the interstellar medium. Researchers occasionally use the term stardust to refer to presolar grains, particularly in science communication, though the term is sometimes used interchangeably in the scientific literature.

== History ==
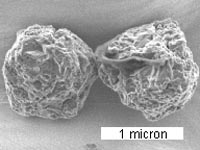
Presolar grains of the Murchison meteorite

In the 1960s, the noble gases neon and xenon were discovered to have unusual isotopic ratios in primitive meteorites; their origin and the type of matter that contained them was a mystery. These discoveries were made by vaporizing a bulk sample of a meteorite within a mass spectrometer, in order to count the relative abundance of the isotopes of the very small amount of noble gases trapped as inclusions. During the 1970s similar experiments discovered more components of trapped xenon isotopes. Competing speculations about the origins of the xenon isotopic components were advanced, all within the existing paradigm that the variations were created by processes within an initially homogeneous solar gas cloud.

A new theoretical framework for interpretation was advanced during the 1970s when Donald D. Clayton rejected the popular belief among meteoriticists that the Solar System began as a uniform hot gas. Instead he predicted that unusual but predictable isotopic compositions would be found within thermally condensed interstellar grains that had condensed during mass loss from stars of differing types. He argued that such grains exist throughout the interstellar medium. Clayton's first papers using that idea in 1975 pictured an interstellar medium populated with supernova grains that are rich in the radiogenic isotopes of Ne and Xe that had defined the extinct radioactivities. Clayton defined several types of presolar grains likely to be discovered: stardust from red giant stars, sunocons (acronym from SUperNOva CONdensates) from supernovae, nebcons from nebular condensation by accretion of cold cloud gaseous atoms and molecules, and novacons from nova condensation. Despite vigorous and continuous active development of this picture, Clayton's suggestions lay unsupported by others for a decade until such grains were discovered within meteorites.

The first unambiguous consequence of the existence of presolar grains within meteorites came from the laboratory of Edward Anders in Chicago, who found using traditional mass spectrometry that the xenon isotopic abundances contained within an acid-insoluble carbonaceous residue that remained after the meteorite bulk had been dissolved in acids matched almost exactly the predictions for isotopic xenon in red giant dust condensate. It then seemed certain that presolar grains were contained within Anders' acid-insoluble residue. Finding the actual presolar grains and documenting them was a much harder challenge that required locating the grains and showing that their isotopes matched those within the red-giant star. There followed a decade of intense experimental searching in the attempt to isolate individual grains of those xenon carriers. But what was really needed to discover presolar grains was a new type of mass spectrometer that could measure the smaller number of atoms in a single grain. Sputtering ion probes were pursued by several laboratories in the attempt to demonstrate such an instrument. But the contemporary ion probes needed to be technologically much better.

In 1987 diamond grains and silicon carbide grains were found to exist abundantly in those same acid-insoluble residues and also to contain large concentrations of noble gases. Significant isotopic anomalies were in turn measured by improvements in secondary ion mass spectrometry (SIMS) within the structural chemical elements of these grains. Improved SIMS experiments showed that the silicon isotopes within each SiC grain did not have solar isotopic ratios but rather those expected in certain red-giant stars. The finding of presolar is therefore dated 1987. To measure the isotopic abundance ratios of the structural elements (e.g. silicon in an SiC grain) in microscopic presolar grains had required two difficult technological and scientific steps: 1) locating micron-sized presolar grains within the meteorite's overwhelming mass; 2) development of SIMS technology to a sufficiently high level to measure isotopic abundance ratios within micron-sized grains. Ernst Zinner became an important leader in SIMS applications to microscopic grains.

In January 2020, analysis of the Murchison meteorite concluded that out of 40 presolar silicon carbide grains examined, one had formed 3 ± 2 billion years before the 4.6 billion year-old Sun. This would make some of the grains the oldest solid material ever discovered on Earth.

== In meteorites ==
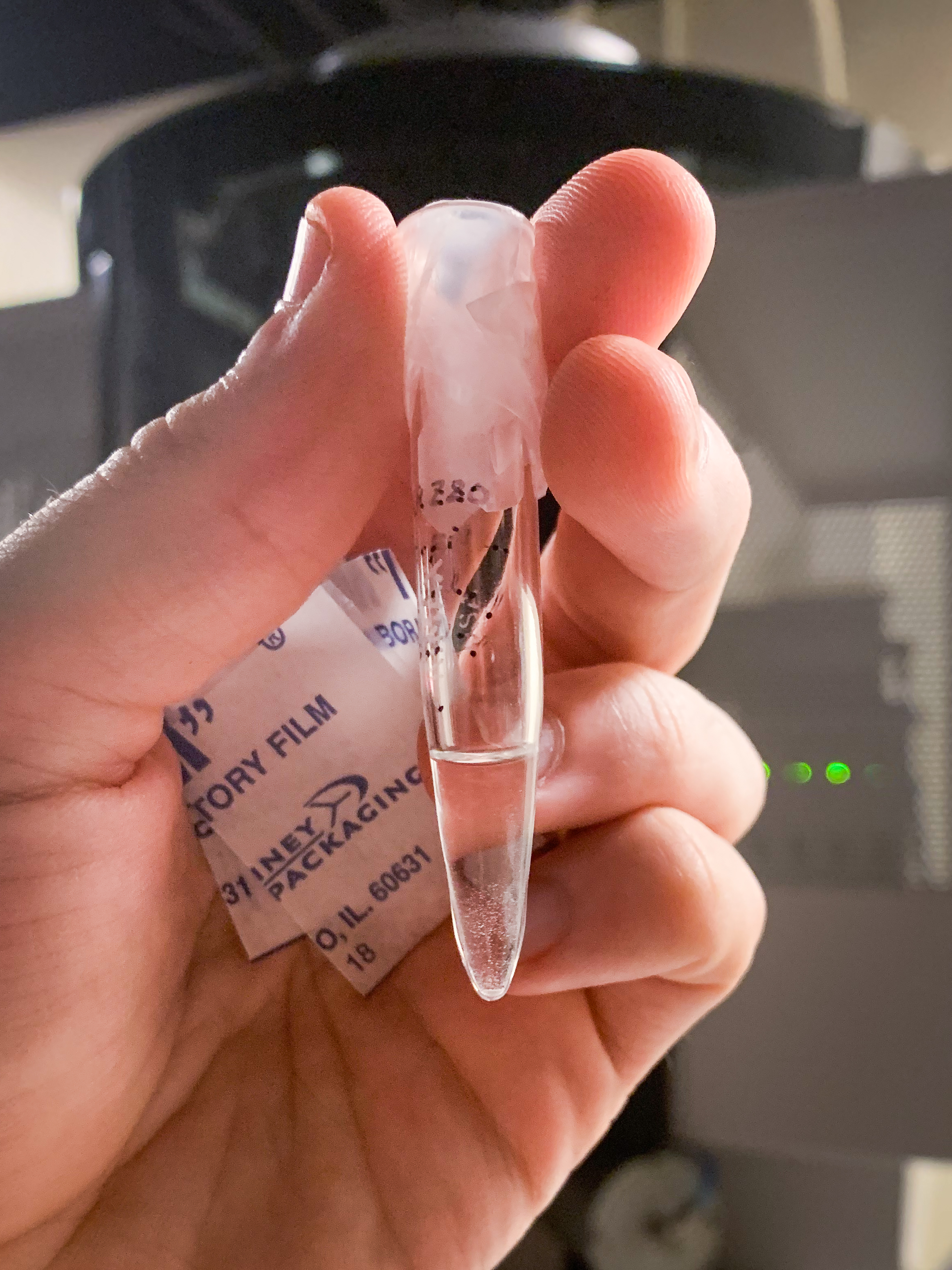
Vial of suspended presolar grains from the Orgueil meteorite.

Presolar grains are the solid matter that was contained in the interstellar gas before the Sun formed. The presolar component can be identified in the laboratory by their abnormal isotopic abundances and consists of refractory minerals which survived the collapse of the solar nebula and the subsequent formation of planetesimals.

To meteorite researchers, the term presolar grains has come to mean presolar grains found in meteorites, of which 99% are stardust. Many other types of cosmic dust have not been detected in meteorites. Presolar grains comprise only about 0.1 percent of the total mass of particulate matter found in meteorites. Such grains are isotopically-distinct material found in the fine-grained matrix of meteorites, such as primitive chondrites. Their isotopic differences from the encasing meteorite require that they predate the Solar System. The crystallinity of those clusters ranges from micrometer-sized silicon carbide crystals (up to 10^{13} atoms), down to that of nanometer-sized diamond (about 1000 atoms), and unlayered graphene crystals of fewer than 100 atoms. The refractory grains achieved their mineral structures by condensing thermally within the slowly cooling expanding gases of supernovae and of red giant stars.

== Characterization ==
Presolar grains are investigated using scanning or transmission electron microscopes (SEM/TEM), and mass spectrometric methods (noble gas mass spectrometry, resonance ionization mass spectrometry (RIMS), secondary ion mass spectrometry (SIMS, NanoSIMS)). Presolar grains that consist of diamonds are only a few nanometers in size and are, therefore, called nanodiamonds. Because of their small size, nanodiamonds are hard to investigate and, although they are among the first presolar grains discovered, relatively little is known about them. The typical sizes of other presolar grains are in the range of micrometers.

Presolar grains consisting of the following minerals have so far been identified:

- diamond (C) nanometer-sized grains (~2.6 nanometres (1/10000000 in) diameter) possibly formed by vapor deposition
- graphite (C) particles and anions, some with unlayered graphene cores
- silicon carbide (SiC) submicrometer to micrometer sized grains. Presolar SiC occurs as single-polytype grains or polytype intergrowths. The atomic structures observed contain the two lowest order polytypes: hexagonal 2H and cubic 3C (with varying degrees of stacking fault disorder) as well as 1-dimensionally disordered SiC grains. In comparison, SiC synthesized in terrestrial laboratories is known to form over a hundred polytypes.
- titanium carbide (TiC) and other carbides within C and SiC grains
- silicon nitride (Si_{3}N_{4})
- corundum (Al_{2}O_{3})
- spinel (MgAl_{2}O_{4})
- hibonite ((Ca,Ce)(Al,Ti,Mg)_{12}O_{19})
- titanium oxide (TiO_{2})
- silicate minerals (olivine and pyroxene)

== Information on stellar evolution ==
The study of presolar grains provides information about nucleosynthesis and stellar evolution. Grains bearing the isotopic signature of "r-process" (rapid neutron capture) and alpha process (alpha capture) types of nucleosynthesis are useful in testing models of supernova explosions.

1% of presolar grains (supernova grains) have very large excesses of calcium-44, a stable isotope of calcium which normally composes only 2% of the calcium abundance. The calcium in some presolar grains is composed primarily of ^{44}Ca, which is presumably the remains of the extinct radionuclide titanium-44, a titanium isotope which is formed in abundance in Type II supernovae such as SN 1987A after rapid capture of four alpha particles by ^{28}Si, after the process of silicon burning normally begins, and prior to the supernova explosion. However, ^{44}Ti has a half-life of only 59 years, and thus it is soon converted entirely to ^{44}Ca. Excesses of the decay products of the longer-lived, but extinct, nuclides calcium-41 (half-life 99,400 years) and aluminium-26 (730,000 years) have also been detected in such grains. The rapid-process isotopic anomalies of these grains include relative excesses of nitrogen-15 and oxygen-18 relative to Solar System abundances, as well as excesses of the neutron-rich stable nuclides ^{42}Ca and ^{49}Ti.

Other presolar grains provide isotopic and physical information on asymptotic giant branch stars (AGB stars), which have manufactured the largest portion of the refractory elements lighter than iron in the galaxy. Because the elements in these particles were made at different times (and places) in the early Milky Way, the set of collected particles further provides insight into galactic evolution prior to the formation of the Solar System.

In addition to providing information on nucleosynthesis of the grain's elements, solid grains provide information on the physico-chemical conditions under which they condensed, and on events subsequent to their formation. For example, consider red giants — which produce much of the carbon in our galaxy. Their atmospheres are cool enough for condensation processes to take place, resulting in the precipitation of solid particles (i.e., multiple atom agglomerations of elements such as carbon) in their atmosphere. This is unlike the atmosphere of the Sun, which is too hot to allow atoms to build up into more complex molecules. These solid fragments of matter are then injected into the interstellar medium by radiation pressure. Hence, particles bearing the signature of stellar nucleosynthesis provide information on (i) condensation processes in red giant atmospheres, (ii) radiation and heating processes in the interstellar medium, and (iii) the types of particles that carried the elements of which we are made, across the galaxy to the Solar System.

== See also ==
- Circumstellar dust
- Cosmic dust
- Cosmochemistry
- Extraterrestrial diamonds
- Extraterrestrial materials
- Glossary of meteoritics
- Interplanetary dust cloud
- List of meteorite minerals
