= Calcium aluminates =

Chemical compound

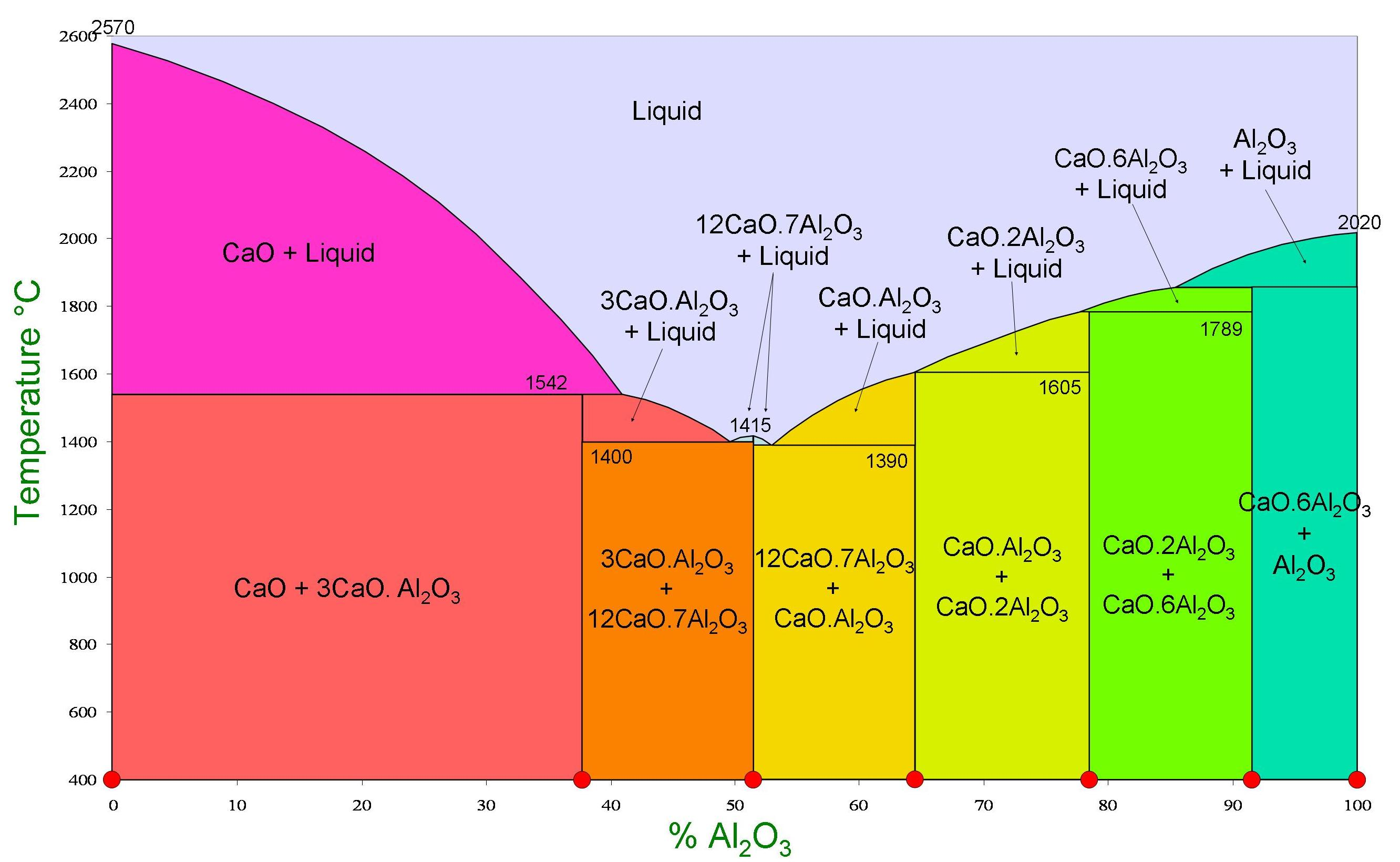
Calcium aluminates phase diagram

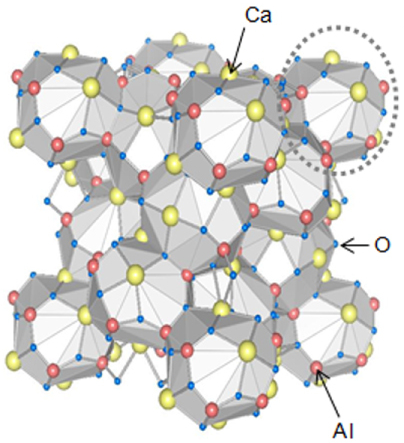
Crystal structure of dodecacalcium hepta-aluminate, 12CaO·7Al_{2}O_{3} (C_{12}A_{7}).

Calcium aluminates are a range of materials obtained by heating calcium oxide and aluminium oxide together at high temperatures. They are encountered in the manufacture of refractories and cements.

The stable phases shown in the phase diagram (formed at atmospheric pressure under an atmosphere of normal humidity) are:

- Tricalcium aluminate, 3CaO·Al_{2}O_{3} (C_{3}A)
- Dodecacalcium hepta-aluminate, 12CaO·7Al_{2}O_{3} (C_{12}A_{7}) (once known as mayenite)
- Monocalcium aluminate, CaO·Al_{2}O_{3} (CA) (occurring in nature as krotite and dmitryivanovite – two polymorphs)
- Monocalcium dialuminate, CaO·2Al_{2}O_{3} (CA_{2}) (occurring in nature as grossite)
- Monocalcium hexa-aluminate, CaO·6Al_{2}O_{3} (CA_{6}) (occurring in nature as hibonite, a representative of magnetoplumbite group)

In addition, other phases include:

- Dicalcium aluminate, 2CaO·Al_{2}O_{3} (C_{2}A), which exists only at pressures above 2500 MPa. The crystal is orthorhombic, with density 3480 kg·m^{−3}. The natural dicalcium aluminate, brownmillerite, may form at normal pressure but elevated temperature in pyrometamorphic zones, e.g., in burning coal-mining heaps.
- Pentacalcium trialuminate, 5CaO·3Al_{2}O_{3} (C_{5}A_{3}), forms only under an anhydrous and oxygen free atmosphere. The crystal is orthorhombic, with a density of 3067 kg·m^{−3}. It reacts rapidly with water.
- Tetracalcium trialuminate, 4CaO·3Al_{2}O_{3} (C_{4}A_{3}), is a metastable phase formed by dehydrating 4CaO·3Al_{2}O_{3}·3H_{2}O (C_{4}A_{3}H_{3}).

== Hydration reaction ==
In contrast to Portland cements, calcium aluminates do not release calcium hydroxide (Ca(OH)_{2}) portlandite or lime during their hydration.

== See also ==
- Calcium aluminate cements
- Cement
- Cement chemist notation (CCN)
  in which the following abbreviations for calcium and aluminium oxides are defined as:
  - C = CaO
  - A = Al_{2}O_{3}
- Hydrocalumite
- Mayenite
- Ye'elimite, C_{4}A_{3}S̅, a rare natural anhydrous calcium sulfoaluminate
