= Aluminate =

Compound containing an oxyanion of aluminium

In chemistry, an aluminate is a compound containing an oxyanion of aluminium, such as sodium aluminate. In the naming of inorganic compounds, it is a suffix that indicates a polyatomic anion with a central aluminium atom.

== Aluminate oxyanions ==
Aluminium oxide (alumina) is amphoteric: it dissolves in both bases and acids. When dissolved in bases it forms hydroxyaluminate ions in the same way as aluminium hydroxide or aluminium salts. The hydroxyaluminate or hydrated aluminate can be precipitated and then calcined to produce anhydrous aluminates. Aluminates are often formulated as a combination of basic oxide and aluminium oxide, for example the formula of anhydrous sodium aluminate NaAlO_{2} would be shown as Na_{2}O·Al_{2}O_{3}. A number of aluminate oxyanions are known:

- The simplest is the approximately tetrahedral AlO^{5−}_{4} found in the compound Na_{5}AlO_{4},
- Framework AlO^{−}_{2} ions in anhydrous sodium aluminate NaAlO_{2} and monocalcium aluminate, CaAl_{2}O_{4} made up of corner-sharing AlO_{4} tetrahedra.
- A ring anion, the cyclic Al_{6}O^{18−}_{18} anion, found in tricalcium aluminate, Ca_{3}Al_{2}O_{6}, which can be considered to consist of 6 corner sharing AlO_{4} tetrahedra.
- A number of infinite chain anions in the compounds Na_{7}Al_{3}O_{8} which contains rings linked to form chains, Na_{7}Al_{13}O_{10} and Na_{17}Al_{5}O_{16} which contain discrete chain anions.

== Mixed oxides containing aluminium ==
There are many mixed oxides containing aluminium where there are no discrete or polymeric aluminate ions. The spinels with a generic formula A^{2+}(B^{3+})_{2}(O^{2−})_{4} that contain aluminium as Al^{3+}, such as the mineral spinel itself, MgAl_{2}O_{4} are mixed oxides with cubic close packed O atoms and aluminium Al^{3+} in octahedral positions.

BeAl_{2}O_{4}, chrysoberyl, isomorphous with olivine, has hexagonal close-packed oxygen atoms with aluminium in octahedral positions and beryllium in tetrahedral positions.

Some oxides with the general formula of MAlO_{3} sometimes called aluminates or orthoaluminates such as YAlO_{3}, Yttrium ortho-aluminate are mixed oxides and have the perovskite structure. Some oxides such as Y_{3}Al_{5}O_{12}, usually called YAG, have the garnet structure.

== Hydroxyaluminates ==
The Al(OH)^{−}_{4} anion is known in high pH solutions of Al(OH)_{3}.

== Aluminate glasses ==
Alumina on its own cannot easily be made glassy with current techniques, however with the addition of a second compound many types of aluminate glasses can be formed. The glasses produced display a range of interesting and useful properties, such as high refractive index, good infrared transparency, and high melting point, as well as the ability to host laser active and fluorescent ions. Aerodynamic levitation is a key method used to study and produce many aluminate glasses. Levitation allows high purity to be maintained in the melt at temperatures in excess of 2,000 K (1,700 °C; 3,100 °F).

Some materials that are known to form glass in binary combination with aluminium oxide are: rare earth oxides, alkaline earth oxides (CaO, SrO, BaO), lead oxide, and silicon dioxide.

Also, the Al_{2}O_{3} (aluminate) system has been discovered to form sapphire-like glass ceramics. Often, this ability is based upon compositions in which interplay between glass forming ability and glass stability is approximately balanced.

== Applications of aluminates ==
Sodium aluminate, NaAlO_{2}, is used industrially in dyeing to form a mordant and the hydrated forms are used in water purification, sizing of paper and in the manufacture of zeolites, ceramics and catalysts in the petrochemical industry. In the isomerization process of alkenes and amines Calcium aluminates are important ingredients of cements.

Li_{5}AlO_{4} is used in the nuclear power industry.

== Aluminate suffix used in the naming of inorganic compounds ==
Examples are:

- Tetrachloroaluminate ion AlCl^{−}_{4} found in for example lithium tetrachloroaluminate.
- Tetrahydroaluminate ion AlH^{−}_{4} found in for example lithium aluminium hydride.
- Hexafluoroaluminate ion AlF^{3−}_{6} found in for example sodium hexafluoroaluminate.

== Aluminates made using new raw materials ==
Many recent research studies have focused on an effective solution for waste treatment. This has led some residues to be made into new raw materials for many industries. Such an achievement ensures a reduction in energy and natural resource usage, decreasing of the negative environmental impact and creating new fields of work.

A good example comes from the metals industry, particularly the aluminium industry. Aluminium recycling is a beneficial activity for the environment, since it recovers resources from both manufacturing and consumer waste. Slag and scrap which were previously considered as waste, are now the raw material for some highly profitable new industries. There is added-value in materials made using an aluminium residue which is currently considered as a hazardous waste. Current research is investigating the use of this waste to manufacture glass, glass-ceramic, boehmite and calcium aluminate.
