= Iron pipe =

Iron pipe may refer to:

- Cast iron pipe
- Ductile iron pipe
