= Damp proofing =

Type of moisture control in building construction

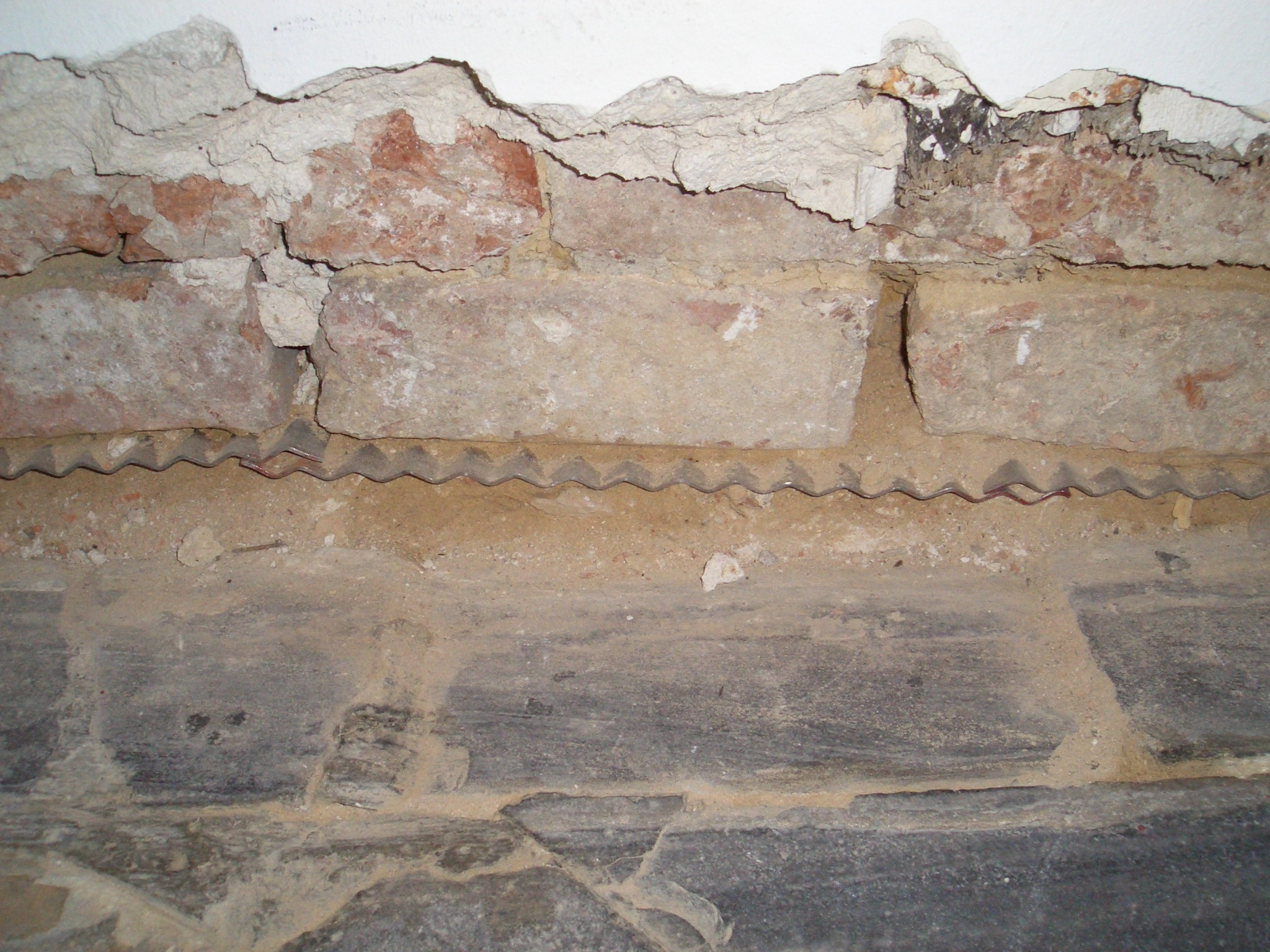
A metal damp proof course (DPC) between the stone foundation and brick wall

Damp proofing in construction is a type of moisture control applied to building walls and floors to prevent moisture from passing into the interior spaces. Dampness problems are among the most frequent problems encountered in residences.

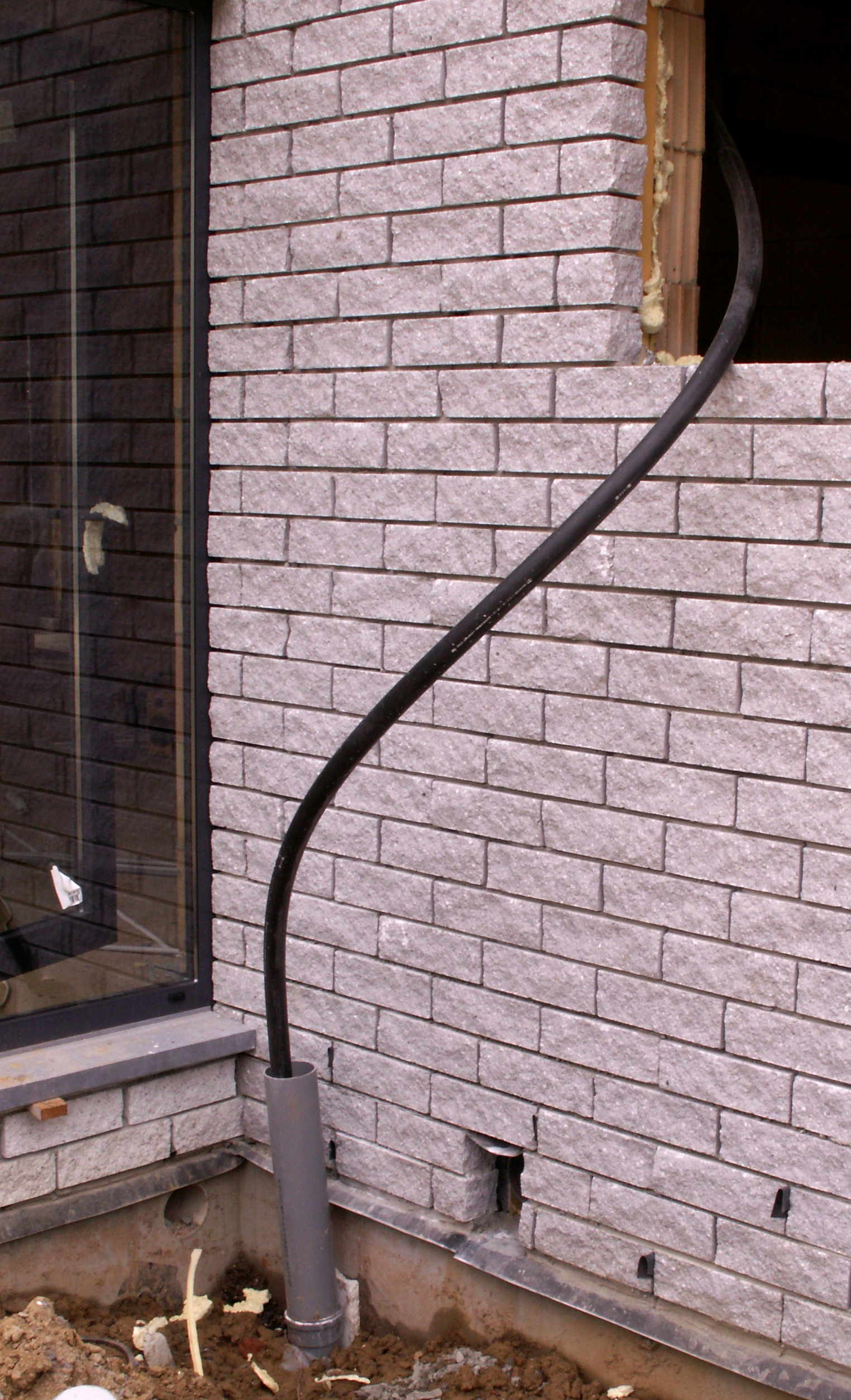
DPC visible between concrete foundation and brickwork.

Damp proofing is defined by the American Society for Testing and Materials (ASTM) as a material that resists the passage of water with no hydrostatic pressure. Waterproof is defined by the ASTM as a treatment that resists the passage of water under pressure. Generally, damp proofing keeps exterior moisture from entering a building; vapor barriers, a separate category, keep interior moisture from getting into walls. Moisture resistance is not necessarily absolute; it is usually stated in terms of acceptable limits based on engineering tolerances and a specific test method.

== Methods ==
Damp proofing is accomplished several ways including:

- A damp-proof course (DPC) is a barrier through the structure designed to prevent moisture rising by capillary action such as through a phenomenon known as rising damp. Rising damp is the effect of water rising from the ground into property. The damp proof course may be horizontal or vertical. A DPC layer is usually laid below all masonry walls, regardless if the wall is a load bearing wall or a partition wall.
- A damp-proof membrane (DPM) is a membrane material applied to prevent moisture transmission. A common example is polyethylene sheeting laid under a concrete slab to prevent the concrete from gaining moisture through capillary action. A DPM may be used for the DPC.
- Integral damp proofing in concrete involves adding materials to the concrete mix to make the concrete itself impermeable.
- Surface suppressant coating with thin water proof materials such as epoxy resin for resistance to non-pressurized moisture such as rain water or a coating of cement sprayed on such as shotcrete which can resist water under pressure.
- Cavity wall construction, such as rainscreen construction, is where the interior walls are separated from the exterior walls by a cavity.
- Pressure grouting cracks and joints in masonry materials.

== Materials ==
Materials widely used for damp proofing include:

- Flexible materials like butyl rubber, hot bitumen (asphalt), plastic sheets, bituminous felts, sheets of lead, copper, etc.
- Semi-rigid materials like mastic asphalt
- Rigid materials, like impervious brick, stone, slate, cement mortar, or cement concrete painted with bitumen, etc.
- Stones
- Mortar with waterproofing compounds
- Coarse sand layers under floors
- Continuous plastic sheets under floors
- Wood

== Masonry construction ==
A DPC is a durable, impermeable material such as slate, felt paper, metal, plastic or special engineered bricks bedded into the mortar between two courses of bricks or blocks. It can often be seen as a thin line in the mortar near ground level. To create a continuous barrier, pieces of DPC or DPM may be sealed together. In addition, the DPC may be sealed to the DPM around the outside edges of the ground floor, completely sealing the inside of the building from the damp ground around it.

In a masonry cavity wall, there is usually a DPC in both the outer and inner wall. In the outer wall it is normally 150 millimetres (5.9 in) to 200 mm (7.9 in) above ground level (the height of 2-3 brick courses). This allows rain to form puddles and splash up off the ground, without saturating the wall above DPC level. The wall below the DPC may become saturated in rainy weather. The DPC in the inner wall is usually below floor level, (under a suspended timber floor structure), or, with a solid concrete floor, it is usually found immediately above the floor slab so that it can be linked to the DPM under the floor slab. This enables installation of skirting boards above floor level without fear of puncturing it. Alternatively, instead of fitting separate inner and outer DPCs, it is common in commercial housebuilding to use a one-piece length of rigid plastic (with an angled section) that fits neatly across the cavity and slots into both walls (a cavity tray). This method requires weep vents to enable water to drain from the cavity, otherwise dampness could rise from above the DPC.

== Concrete walls and floors ==
Concrete normally allows moisture to pass through so a vertical vapor barrier is needed. Barriers may be a coating or membrane applied to the exterior of the concrete. The coating may be asphalt, asphalt emulsion, a thinned asphalt called cutback asphalt, or an elastomer. Membranes are rubberized asphalt or EPDM rubber. Rubberized products perform better because concrete sometimes develops cracks and the barrier does not crack with the concrete.

== Remedial damp proofing ==
Until the 20th century, masonry buildings in Europe and North America were generally constructed from highly permeable materials such as stone and lime-based mortars and renders covered with soft water-based paints which all allowed any damp to diffuse into the air without damage. The later application of impermeable materials which prevent the natural dispersion of damp, such as tile, linoleum, cement and gypsum-based materials and synthetic paints is thought by some to be the most significant cause of damp problems in older buildings.

There are many solutions for dealing with dampness in existing buildings, the choice of which will largely be determined by the types of dampness that are affecting the building, e.g., rising damp, hygroscopic damp, condensation, penetrating damp, etc.

In older buildings, damp stains on internal walls are usually due to external factors such as:

- Leaking rainwater gutters
- Misdirected rainwater downpipes
- Insufficient external drainage
- Poor drip details to cills and other protrusions
- Bridging of the damp proof course

== Health and safety ==
Some DPC materials may contain asbestos fibres. This was more commonly found in the older, grey sealants as well as flexible tar boards.
