= Water-based pipe coating =

A water-based pipe coating is an environmentally friendly coating that is applied to the inner and outer surfaces of ductile iron pipe. The coating serves to protect the water supply lines from corrosion whether from the outside or the inside. It also serves to protect the drinking water from contamination. The coating is an emulsion manufactured using asphaltene and water primarily, with other raw materials according to the manufacturer's specifications.

== History ==
Water-based coatings began development in the late 1980s. In the early 1990s they began to be widely used, specifically marketed towards drinking water supply lines. Previously, water supply lines were coated using a harmful solvent-based coating, using such solvents as benzene, toluene, hexane and other volatile organic compounds (VOC).

== Manufacturing ==
These coatings are manufactured using a batching system. A solution of raw materials and water is prepared, and the solution is milled with an asphaltene, which serves as a clean building block and a base resin. After the material is processed, it goes through a series of let-down, filtering, and quality control tests.

== Uses ==
The major use of water-based pipe coating is for ductile iron pipe that comprises water supply lines infrastructure. It can also be utilized for pipe flanges and fittings, gray iron pipe (sewer lines), stormwater sealing, utility box sealing, and septic tank and vault sealing.
