= Sulfide =

Ion, and compounds containing the ion

Names
- Systematic IUPAC name Sulfide(2−) (additive), recommended name Sulfanediide (substitutive), not common, rarely used, sometimes generated by automated nomenclature software in organic chemistry

Identifiers
CAS Number	18496-25-8
3D model (JSmol)	Interactive image
ChEBI	CHEBI:15138
ChemSpider	27079
PubChem CID	29109
UNII	G15I91XETI
- InChI: InChI=1S/S/q-2 Key: UCKMPCXJQFINFW-UHFFFAOYSA-N
- SMILES: [S--]

Properties
Chemical formula	S^{2−}
Molar mass	32.06 g·mol^{−1}
Conjugate acid	Bisulfide

Related compounds
Other anions	oxide selenide telluride
- Except where otherwise noted, data are given for materials in their standard state (at 25 °C [77 °F], 100 kPa). Infobox references

Sulfide (also sulphide in British English) is an inorganic anion of sulfur with the chemical formula S^{2−} or a compound containing one or more S^{2−} ions. Solutions of sulfide salts are corrosive. Sulfide also refers to large families of inorganic and organic compounds, e.g. lead sulfide and dimethyl sulfide. Hydrogen sulfide (H_{2}S) and bisulfide (HS^{−}) are the conjugate acids of sulfide.

== Chemical properties ==
The sulfide ion does not exist in aqueous alkaline solutions of Na_{2}S. Instead sulfide converts to hydrosulfide:

S^{2−} + H_{2}O → SH^{−} + OH^{−}

Upon treatment with an acid, sulfide salts convert to hydrogen sulfide:

S^{2−} + H^{+} → SH^{−}
SH^{−} + H^{+} → H_{2}S

Oxidation of sulfide is a complicated process. Depending on the conditions, the oxidation can produce elemental sulfur, polysulfides, polythionates, sulfite, or sulfate. Metal sulfides react with halogens, forming sulfur and metal salts.

8 MgS + 8 I_{2} → S_{8} + 8 MgI_{2}

== Metal derivatives ==
Aqueous solutions of transition metals cations react with sulfide sources (H_{2}S, NaHS, Na_{2}S) to precipitate solid sulfides. Such inorganic sulfides typically have very low solubility in water, and many are related to minerals with the same composition (see below). One famous example is the bright yellow species CdS or "cadmium yellow". The black tarnish formed on sterling silver is Ag_{2}S. Such species are sometimes referred to as salts. In fact, the bonding in transition metal sulfides is highly covalent, which gives rise to their semiconductor properties, which in turn is related to the deep colors. Several have practical applications as pigments, in solar cells, and as catalysts. The fungus Aspergillus niger plays a role in the solubilization of heavy metal sulfides.

== Geology ==
Many important metal ores are sulfides. Significant examples include: argentite (silver sulfide), cinnabar (mercury sulfide), galena (lead sulfide), molybdenite (molybdenum sulfide), pentlandite (nickel sulfide), realgar (arsenic sulfide), stibnite (antimony sulfide), sphalerite (zinc sulfide), pyrite (iron disulfide), and chalcopyrite (iron-copper sulfide). This sulfide minerals recorded information (like isotopes) of their surrounding environment during their formation. Scientists use these minerals to study environments in the deep sea or in the Earth's past.

== Corrosion induced by sulfide ==
Dissolved free sulfides (H_{2}S, HS^{−}, and S^{2−}) are very aggressive species for the corrosion of many metals such as steel, stainless steel, and copper. Sulfides present in aqueous solution are responsible for stress corrosion cracking (SCC) of steel, and is also known as sulfide stress cracking. Corrosion is a major concern in many industrial installations processing sulfides: sulfide ore mills, deep oil wells, pipelines transporting soured oil and Kraft paper factories.

Microbially-induced corrosion (MIC) or biogenic sulfide corrosion are also caused by sulfate reducing bacteria producing sulfide that is emitted in the air and oxidized in sulfuric acid by sulfur oxidizing bacteria. Biogenic sulfuric acid reacts with sewerage materials and most generally causes mass loss, cracking of the sewer pipes and ultimately, structural collapse. This kind of deterioration is a major process affecting sewer systems worldwide and leading to very high rehabilitation costs.

Oxidation of sulfide can also form thiosulfate (S_{2}O^{2−}_{3}), an intermediate species responsible for severe problems of pitting corrosion of steel and stainless steel while the medium is also acidified by the production of sulfuric acid when oxidation is more advanced.

== Organic chemistry ==
In organic chemistry, sulfide usually refers to the linkage C–S–C, although the term thioether is less ambiguous. For example, the thioether dimethyl sulfide is CH_{3}–S–CH_{3}. Polyphenylene sulfide (see below) has the empirical formula C_{6}H_{4}S. Occasionally, the term sulfide refers to molecules containing the –SH functional group. For example, methyl sulfide can mean CH_{3}–SH. The preferred descriptor for such SH-containing compounds is thiol or mercaptan, i.e. methanethiol, or methyl mercaptan.

== Disulfides ==
Confusion arises from the different meanings of the term "disulfide". Molybdenum disulfide (MoS_{2}) consists of separated sulfide centers, in association with molybdenum in the formal +4 oxidation state (that is, Mo^{4+} and two S^{2−}). Iron disulfide (pyrite, FeS_{2}) on the other hand consists of S^{2−}_{2}, or ^{−}S−S^{−} dianion, in association with divalent iron in the formal +2 oxidation state (ferrous ion: Fe^{2+}).

Most often in sulfur chemistry and in biochemistry, the disulfide term is commonly ascribed to the sulfur analogue of the peroxide −O−O− bond. The disulfide bond (−S−S−) plays a major role in the conformation of proteins and in the catalytic activity of enzymes.

== Examples ==
Formula	Description	Melting point		Boiling point		CAS Number
Formula	Description	°C	°F	°C	°F	CAS Number
CdS	Cadmium sulfide can be used in photocells.	1,480	2,700	n/a		1306-23-6
CS_{2}	Carbon disulfide is a precursor to organosulfur compounds.	−111.7	−169.1	46.2	115.2	75-15-0
H_{2}S	Hydrogen sulfide is a very toxic and corrosive gas characterised by a typical odour of "rotten egg".	−85.5	−121.9	−59.55	−75.19	7783-06-4
FeS_{2}	Iron disulfide, or pyrite, known as "fool's gold", is a common mineral.	600	1,112	Decomposes		1317-66-4
PbS	Lead sulfide is used in infra-red sensors.	1,113	2,035	n/a		1314-87-0
MoS_{2}	Molybdenum disulfide, the mineral molybdenite, is used as a catalyst to remove sulfur from fossil fuels; also as lubricant for high-temperature and high-pressure applications.	1,750	3,180	n/a		1317-33-5
SeS_{2}	Selenium disulfide is an antifungal used in anti-dandruff preparations, such as Selsun Blue.	100	212	n/a		7488-56-4
Ag_{2}S	Silver sulfide is a component of silver tarnish.	836	1,537	n/a		21548-73-2
Na_{2}S	Sodium sulfide, as the hydrate, is used in manufacture of kraft paper and as a precursor to organosulfur compounds.	1,172	2,142	n/a		1313-82-2
ZnS	Zinc sulfide is used for lenses and other optical devices in the infrared part of the spectrum. ZnS-doped with silver is used in alpha detectors while zinc sulfide with traces of copper has applications in photoluminescent strips for emergency lighting and luminous watch dials.	1,827	3,321	Sublimes		1314-98-3

== Preparation ==
Sulfide compounds can be prepared in several different ways:

1. Direct combination of elements:
  Example: Fe_{(s)} + S_{(s)} → FeS_{(s)}
2. Reduction of a sulfate:
  Example: MgSO_{4(s)} + 4C_{(s)} → MgS_{(s)} + 4CO_{(g)}
3. Precipitation of an insoluble sulfide:
  Example: M^{2+} + H_{2}S_{(g)} → MS_{(s)} + 2H^{+}_{(aq)}

== Safety ==
Many metal sulfides are so insoluble in water that they are probably not very toxic. Some metal sulfides, when exposed to a strong mineral acid, including gastric acids, will release toxic hydrogen sulfide.

Organic sulfides are highly flammable. When a sulfide burns it produces sulfur dioxide (SO_{2}) gas.

Hydrogen sulfide, some sulfide salts, and almost all organic sulfides have a strong and putrid stench; rotting biomass releases these.

== Nomenclature ==
The systematic names sulfanediide and sulfide(2−), valid IUPAC names, are determined according to the substitutive and additive nomenclatures, respectively. The name sulfide is also used in compositional IUPAC nomenclature which does not take the nature of bonding involved. Examples of such naming include selenium disulfide and titanium sulfide, which contain no sulfide ions.
