= Biogenic sulfide corrosion =

Microbial degradation involving the sulfur cycle

Biogenic sulfide corrosion is a bacterially mediated process of forming hydrogen sulfide gas and the subsequent conversion to sulfuric acid that attacks concrete and steel within wastewater environments. The hydrogen sulfide gas is biochemically oxidized in the presence of moisture to form sulfuric acid. The effect of sulfuric acid on concrete and steel surfaces exposed to severe wastewater environments can be devastating. In the USA alone, corrosion causes sewer asset losses estimated at $14 billion per year. This cost is expected to increase as the aging infrastructure continues to fail.

== Environment ==
Corrosion may occur where stale sewage releases hydrogen sulfide gas in an atmosphere containing oxygen gas and high relative humidity. There must be an underlying anaerobic aquatic habitat containing sulfates and an overlying aerobic aquatic habitat separated by a gas phase containing both oxygen and hydrogen sulfide at concentrations in excess of 2 ppm.

=== Conversion of sulfate to hydrogen sulfide ===
Fresh domestic sewage entering a wastewater collection system contains proteins, including organic sulfur compounds oxidizable to sulfates (SO^{2−}_{4}), and may contain inorganic sulfates. Dissolved oxygen is depleted as bacteria begin to catabolize organic material in sewage. In the absence of dissolved oxygen and nitrates, sulfates are reduced to hydrogen sulfide (H_{2}S) as an alternative source of oxygen for catabolizing organic waste by sulfate-reducing bacteria (SRB), identified primarily from the obligate anaerobic species Desulfovibrio.

Hydrogen sulfide production depends on various physicochemical, topographic, and hydraulic parameters such as:

- Sewage oxygen concentration. The threshold is 0.1 mg/l; above this value, sulfides produced in sludge and sediments are oxidized by oxygen; below this value, sulfides are emitted in the gaseous phase.
- Temperature. The higher the temperature, the faster the kinetics of H_{2}S production.
- Sewage pH. It must be included between 5.5 and 9, with an optimum at 7.5–8.
- Sulfate concentration
- Nutrients concentration, associated to the biochemical oxygen demand
- Conception of the sewage As H_{2}S is formed only in anaerobic conditions. Slow flow and long retention times give aerobic bacteria more time to consume all available dissolved oxygen, creating anaerobic conditions. The flatter the land, the less slope can be given to the sewer network, and this favors slower flow and more pumping stations (where retention time is generally longer).

=== Conversion of hydrogen sulfide to sulfuric acid ===
Some hydrogen sulfide gas diffuses into the headspace above the wastewater. Moisture evaporating from warm sewage may condense on the emerged walls of sewers and likely form small droplets hanging from the sewer's horizontal crown. As some of the hydrogen sulfide and oxygen gases from the air above the sewage dissolve into these stationary droplets, they become a habitat for sulfur-oxidizing bacteria (SOB), of the genus Acidithiobacillus. Colonies of these aerobic bacteria metabolize the hydrogen sulfide gas to sulfuric acid (H_{2}SO_{4}).

== Corrosion ==
Sulfuric acid produced by microorganisms will interact with the surface of the structure material. For ordinary Portland cement, it reacts with the calcium hydroxide in concrete to form calcium sulfate. This change simultaneously destroys the polymeric nature of calcium hydroxide. It substitutes a larger molecule into the matrix, causing pressure and spalling of the adjacent concrete and aggregate particles. The weakened crown may then collapse under heavy overburden loads. Even within a well-designed sewer network, a rule of thumb in the industry suggests that 5% of the total length may suffer from biogenic corrosion. In these specific areas, biogenic sulfide corrosion can deteriorate metal or several millimeters per year of concrete (see Table).

Source	Thickness loss (in mm/year)	Material type
US EPA (1991)	2.5 – 10	Concrete
Morton et al. (1991)	2.7	Concrete
Mori et al. (1992)	4.3 – 4.7	Concrete
Ismail et al. (1993)	2 – 4	Mortar
Davis (1998)	3.1	Concrete
Monteny et al. (2001)	1.0 – 1.3	Mortar
Vincke et al. (2002)	1.1 – 1.8	Concrete

For calcium aluminate cements, processes are completely different because they are based on another chemical composition. At least three different mechanisms contribute to the better resistance to biogenic corrosion:

- The first barrier is the larger acid neutralizing capacity of calcium aluminate cements vs. ordinary Portland Cement; one gram of calcium aluminate cement can neutralize around 40% more acid than a gram of ordinary Portland cement. For a given production of acid by the biofilm, a calcium aluminate cement concrete will last longer.
- The second barrier is due to the precipitation, when the surficial pH gets below 10, of a layer of alumina gel (AH3 in cement chemistry notation). AH3 is a stable compound down to pH 4, and it forms an acid-resistant barrier as long as the surface pH is not lowered below 3–4 by bacterial activity.
- The third barrier is the bacteriostatic effect locally activated when the surface reaches pH values less than 3–4. At this level, the alumina gel is no longer stable and will dissolve, liberating aluminum ions. These ions will accumulate in the thin biofilm. Once the concentration reaches 300–500 ppm, it will produce a bacteriostatic effect on bacteria metabolism. In other words, bacteria will stop oxidizing the sulfur from H_{2}S to produce acid, and the pH will stop decreasing.

A mortar made of calcium aluminate cement combined with calcium aluminate aggregates, i.e., a 100% calcium aluminate material, will last much longer, as aggregates can also limit microbial growth and inhibit acid generation at the source.

== Prevention ==
There are several options to address biogenic sulfide corrosion problems: reducing H_{2}S formation, venting H_{2}S, or using materials resistant to biogenic corrosion. For example, sewage flows more rapidly through steeper-gradient sewers, reducing the time available for hydrogen sulfide generation. Likewise, removing sludge and sediments from the bottom of pipes minimises the number of anoxic areas that support sulfate-reducing bacteria growth. Providing good ventilation of sewers can reduce atmospheric concentrations of hydrogen sulfide gas and may dry exposed sewer crowns, but this may create odor issues with neighbors around the venting shafts. Three other efficient methods can be used involving continuous operation of mechanical equipment: chemical reactant like calcium nitrate can be continuously added in the sewerage water to impair the H_{2}S formation, an active ventilation through odor treatment units to remove H_{2}S, or an injection of compressed air in pressurized mains to avoid the anaerobic condition to develop. In sewerage areas where biogenic sulfide corrosion is expected, acid-resistant materials like calcium aluminate cements, PVC or vitrified clay pipe may be substituted to ordinary concrete or steel sewers.

Existing structures that have extensive exposure to biogenic corrosion, such as sewer manholes and pump station wet wells, can be rehabilitated. Rehabilitation can be done with materials such as a structural epoxy coating; this epoxy is designed to be both acid-resistant and to strengthen the compromised concrete structure.

== See also ==
- Corrosion
- Microbial corrosion
- Sulfide
- Sulfide stress cracking
