= Oakum =

Tarred fiber

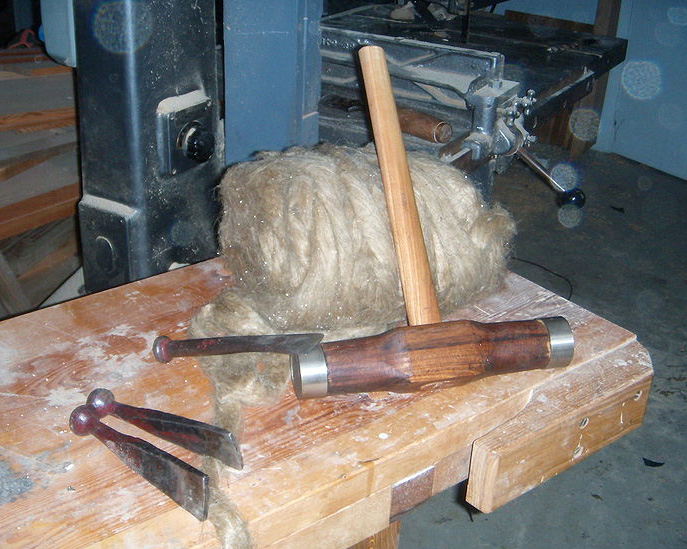
Oakum and tools for caulking

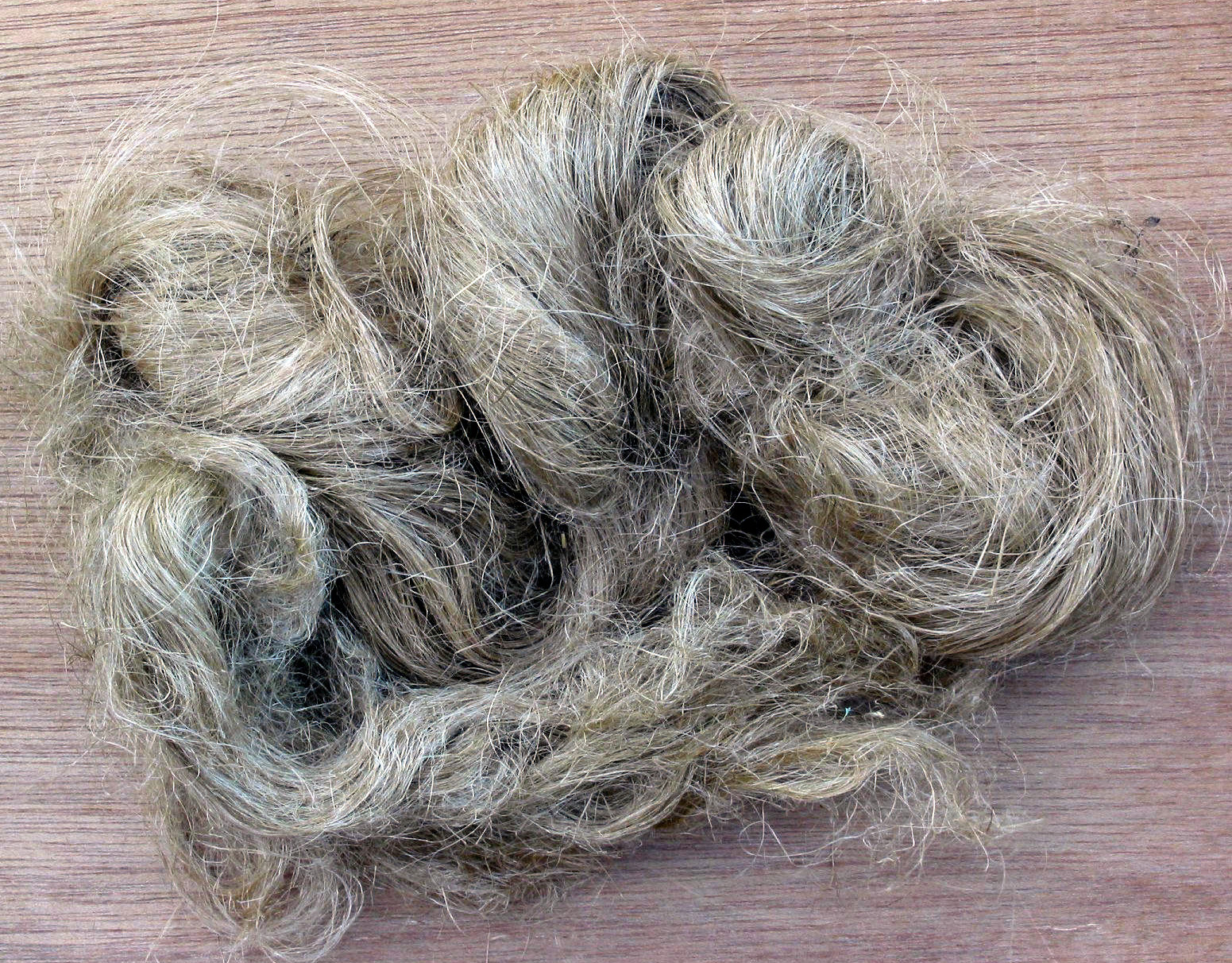
Hemp

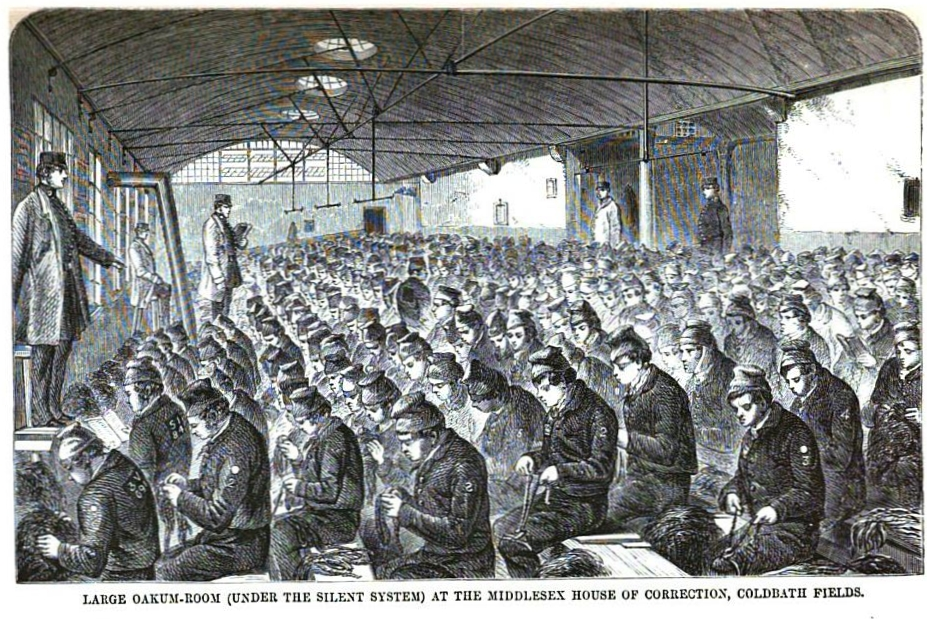
Prisoners picking oakum at Coldbath Fields Prison in London

Oakum is a preparation of tarred fibers used to seal gaps. Its traditional application was in shipbuilding for caulking or packing the joints of timbers in wooden vessels and the deck planking of iron and steel ships. Oakum was also used in plumbing for sealing joints in cast iron pipe, and in log cabins for chinking. In shipbuilding it was forced into the seams using a hammer and a caulking iron, then sealed into place with hot pitch.

It is also referenced frequently as a medical supply for medieval surgeons, often used alongside bandages for sealing wounds.

== History ==
The word oakum derives from Middle English okome, from Old English ācumba, from ā- (separative and perfective prefix) + -cumba (akin to Old English camb, "comb")—literally "off-combings".

Oakum was at one time recycled from old tarry ropes and cordage, which were painstakingly unravelled and reduced to fibre, termed "picking". The task of picking and preparation was a common occupation in prisons and workhouses, where the young or the old and infirm were put to work picking oakum if they were unsuited for heavier labour. Sailors undergoing naval punishment were also frequently sentenced to pick oakum, with each man made to pick 1 pound (450 g) of oakum a day.

The work was tedious, slow and taxing on the worker's thumbs and fingers. In 1862, girls under 16 at Tothill Fields Bridewell had to pick 1 pound (450 g) a day, and boys under 16 had to pick 1 1/2 pounds (680 g). Over the age of 16, girls and boys had to pick 1 1/2 and 2 pounds (680 and 910 g) per day respectively. The oakum was sold for £4 10s (equivalent to £494 in 2025) per hundredweight (112 lb, 51 kg). At Coldbath Fields Prison, the men's counterpart to Tothill Fields, prisoners had to pick 2 lb (910 g) per day unless sentenced to hard labour, in which case they had to pick between 3 and 6 lb (1.4 and 2.7 kg) of oakum per day.

In modern times, the fibrous material used in oakum comes from virgin hemp or jute. In plumbing and marine applications, the fibers are impregnated with tar or a tar-like substance, traditionally pine tar (also called "Stockholm tar"), an amber-coloured pitch made from pine sap. Tar-like petroleum by-products can also be used for modern oakum. When working on HMS Victory in the 2020s hemp combined with Jeffery’s Marine Glue was used.

"White oakum" is made from untarred material, and was chiefly used as packing between brick and masonry in homes and building construction prior to World War II, as its breathability allows moisture to continue to wick and transfer through the material.

== Plumbing ==
Oakum can be used to seal cast iron pipe drains. After setting the pipes together, workers pack oakum into the joints, then pour molten lead into the joint to create a permanent "lead and oakum" seal. The oakum swells and seals the joint, the tar in the oakum prevents rot, and the lead keeps the joint physically tight. Oakum present in older cast iron bell/spigot joints may also contain asbestos, requiring special methods for removal.

Today, modern methods, such as rubber seals (for example, gaskets or o-rings), are more common.

== Cultural references ==
In Herman Melville's novella Benito Cereno, crew members of a slave ship spend their idle hours picking oakum.

Charles Dickens's novel Oliver Twist mentions the extraction of oakum by orphaned children in the workhouse. The oakum extracted is for use on navy ships, and the instructor says that the children are serving the country.

The Innocents Abroad, a travel book by Mark Twain, also mentions in chapter 37 a "Baker's Boy/Famine Breeder" who eats soap and oakum, but prefers oakum, which makes his breath foul and teeth stuck up with tar.

We tore the tarry rope to shreds
With blunt and bleeding nails;
We rubbed the doors, and scrubbed the floors,
And cleaned the shining rails:
And, rank by rank, we soaped the plank,
And clattered with the pails.

— Oscar Wilde, The Ballad of Reading Gaol, 1897

Jack London, in his book The People of the Abyss (1903) mentions picking oakum in the workhouses of London.

Robert Jordan, in Winter's Heart (2000) alludes to picking oakum as a punishment among the Sea Folk.

Joshua Slocum in Sailing Alone Around the World (1900) describes caulking his ship the Spray, with oakum.

Guy de Chauliac in The Major Surgery of Guy de Chauliac (1363) frequently cites oakum as a medical supply in his treatments of wounds.

Bernard Cornwell, in his Sharpe novels (1980s to 2023) refers to Richard Sharpe's childhood in a workhouse, picking fibres from old rope.
