= Dodecacalcium hepta-aluminate =

Rare mineral mayenite and important phase in calcium aluminate cements

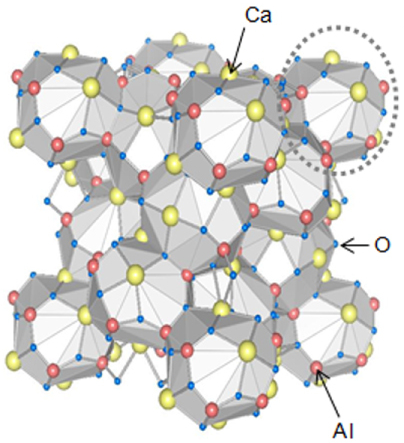
- Crystal structure of C12A7

Names
- Other names C12A7; mayenite; Tetradecaaluminum dodecacalcium tritriacontaoxide

Identifiers
CAS Number	12005-57-1
3D model (JSmol)	Interactive image
ChemSpider	34998567
PubChem CID	118856397
- InChI: InChI=1S/14Al.12Ca.33O/q14*+3;12*+2;33*-2 Key: WAUBKNFRIUQIER-UHFFFAOYSA-N
- SMILES: [O-2].[O-2].[O-2].[O-2].[O-2].[O-2].[O-2].[O-2].[O-2].[O-2].[O-2].[O-2].[O-2].[O-2].[O-2].[O-2].[O-2].[O-2].[O-2].[O-2].[O-2].[O-2].[O-2].[O-2].[O-2].[O-2].[O-2].[O-2].[O-2].[O-2].[O-2].[O-2].[O-2].[Al+3].[Al+3].[Al+3].[Al+3].[Al+3].[Al+3].[Al+3].[Al+3].[Al+3].[Al+3].[Al+3].[Al+3].[Al+3].[Al+3].[Ca+2].[Ca+2].[Ca+2].[Ca+2].[Ca+2].[Ca+2].[Ca+2].[Ca+2].[Ca+2].[Ca+2].[Ca+2].[Ca+2]

Properties
Chemical formula	Ca_{12}Al_{14}O_{33}
Molar mass	1,386.66 g·mol^{−1}
Appearance	Clear to black solid, depending on synthesis and doping
Density	2.68 g·cm^{−3}
Melting point	1,400 °C (2,550 °F; 1,670 K)
Refractive index (n_{D})	1.614–1.643

Structure
Crystal structure	Cubic
Space group	I4̅3d
Lattice constant	a = 1.1989 nm
- Except where otherwise noted, data are given for materials in their standard state (at 25 °C [77 °F], 100 kPa). Infobox references

Dodecacalcium hepta-aluminate (12CaO·7Al_{2}O_{3}, Ca_{12}Al_{14}O_{33} or C_{12}A_{7}) is an inorganic solid that occurs rarely in nature as the mineral mayenite. It is an important phase in calcium aluminate cements and is an intermediate in the manufacture of Portland cement. Its composition and properties have been the subject of much debate, because of variations in composition that can arise during its high-temperature formation.

== Synthesis ==
Polycrystalline C_{12}A_{7} can be prepared via a conventional solid-state reaction, i.e., heating a mixture of calcium carbonate and aluminium oxide or aluminium hydroxide powders, in air. It is not formed in oxygen or in moisture-free atmosphere. It can be regrown into single crystals using the Czochralski or zone melting techniques.

In Portland cement kilns, C_{12}A_{7} is an early reaction product of aluminium and calcium oxides in the temperature range 900–1200 °C. With the onset of melt-phases at higher temperatures, it reacts with further calcium oxide to form tricalcium aluminate. It thus can appear in under-burned kiln products. It also occurs in some natural cements.

== Composition and structure ==
The mineral as normally encountered is a solid solution series with end-members Ca_{12}Al_{14}O_{33} and Ca_{6}Al_{7}O_{16}(OH). The latter composition loses water only at high temperature, and has lost most of it by the melting point (around 1400 °C). If material heated to this temperature is rapidly cooled to room temperature, the anhydrous composition is obtained. The rate of re-absorption of water to form the hydrous composition is negligible below 930 °C.

C_{12}A_{7} has a cubic crystal symmetry; Ca_{12}Al_{14}O_{33} has a lattice constant of 1.1989 nm and a density of 2.680 g·cm^{−3} while Ca_{6}Al_{7}O_{16}(OH) has 1.1976 nm and 2.716 g·cm^{−3}. The unit cell consists of 12 cages with the inner diameter of 0.44 nm and a formal charge of +1/3, two of them host free O^{2−} ions (not shown in the infobox structure). These ions can easily move through the material and can be replaced by F^{−}, Cl^{−} (as in the mineral chlormayenite) or OH^{−} ions.

The confusion regarding composition contributed to the mistaken assignment of the composition Ca_{5}Al_{3}O_{33}. Studies of the system have shown that the solid solution series extends also to the accommodation of other species in place of the hydroxyl group, including halides, sulfide and oxide ions.

== Properties and applications ==
C_{12}A_{7} is an important mineral phase in calcium aluminate cements and is an intermediate in the manufacture of Portland cement. It reacts rapidly with water, with considerable heat evolution, to form 3CaO·Al_{2}O_{3}·6H_{2}O and Al(OH)_{3} gel. The formation of the hydrate from this mineral and from monocalcium aluminate represents the first stage of strength development in aluminous cements. Because of its higher reactivity, leading to excessively rapid hydration, aluminous cements contain relatively low amounts of dodecacalcium hepta-aluminate, or none at all.

C_{12}A_{7} has potential applications in optical, bio and structural ceramics. Some amorphous calcium aluminates are photosensitive and hence are candidates for optical information storage devices. They also have desirable infrared transmission properties for optical fibers.

While undoped C_{12}A_{7} is a wide-bandgap insulator, electron-doped electride C_{12}A_{7}:e^{−} is a metallic conductor with a conductivity reaching 1500 S/cm at room temperature; it may even exhibit superconductivity upon cooling to 0.2–0.4 K. Matsuishi et al. reported the mayenite-derived electride as a room-temperature-stable single crystal in which extra-framework oxide ions are replaced by electrons in the cages. C_{12}A_{7}:e^{−} is also a catalyst that has potential applications in the ambient-pressure synthesis of ammonia; Kitano et al. reported its use as an electron donor and reversible hydrogen store for ruthenium-catalyzed ammonia synthesis. Electron doping is achieved by extracting O^{2−} ions from the C_{12}A_{7} structure via chemical reduction. The injected electrons occupy a unique conduction band called 'the cage conduction band', and migrate through the C_{12}A_{7}:e^{−} crystal by tunneling. They can be readily and reversibly replaced with hydride ions (H^{−}) by heating C_{12}A_{7}:e^{−} in a hydrogen atmosphere. Owing to this reversibility, C_{12}A_{7}:e^{−} does not suffer from hydrogen poisoning – irreversible deterioration of properties upon exposure to hydrogen which is common to traditional catalysts used in the ammonia synthesis.
