= Calcium aluminate cements =

Rapidly setting hydraulic cements

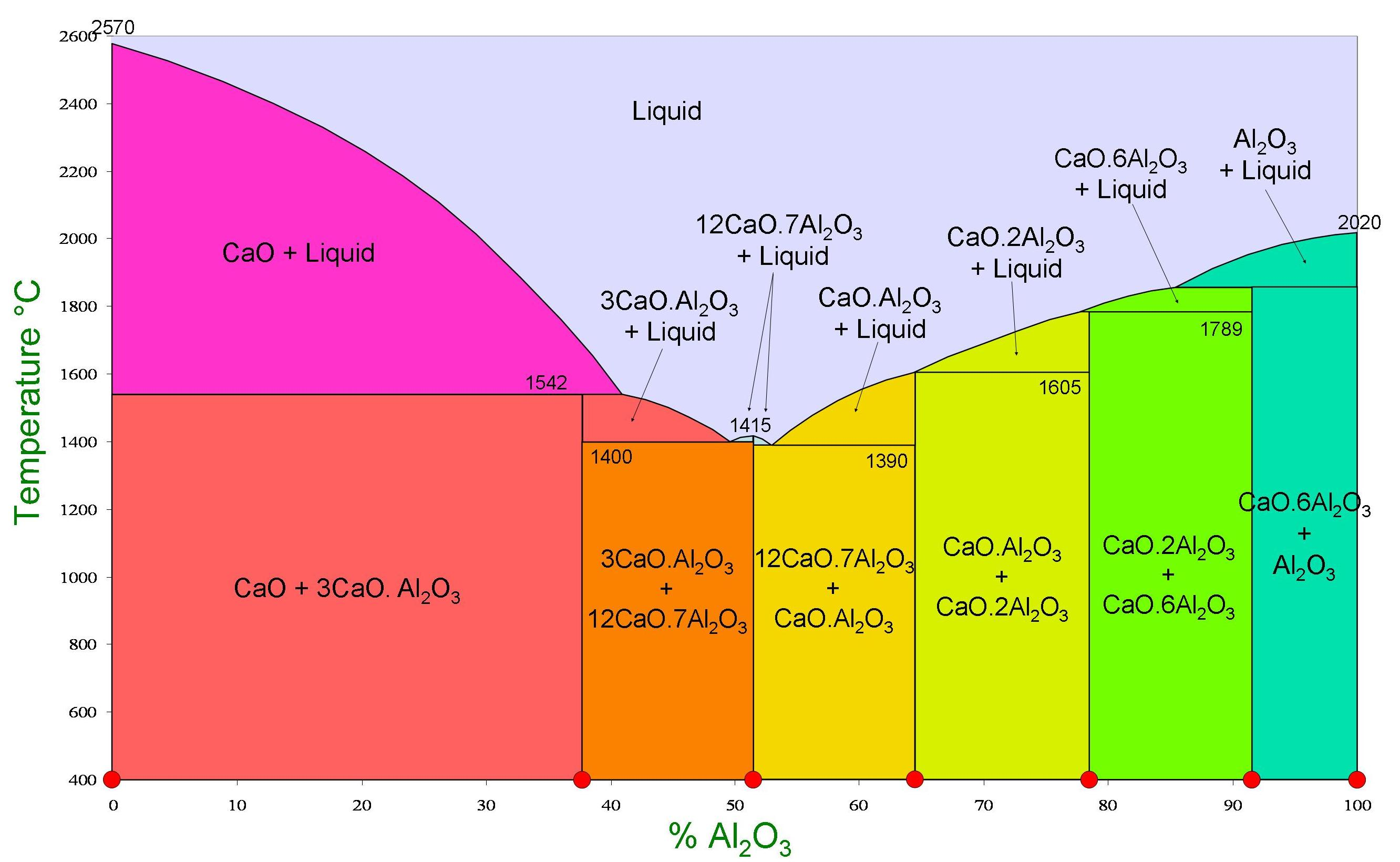
Phase diagram of calcium aluminates present in the anhydrous calcium aluminate cement before hydration.

Calcium aluminate cements are cements consisting predominantly of hydraulic calcium aluminates. Alternative names are "aluminous cement", "high-alumina cement", and "Ciment fondu" in French. They are used in a number of small-scale, specialized applications.

== History ==
The method of making cement from limestone (CaCO_{3}) and low-silica bauxite (Al_{2}O_{3}) was patented in France in 1908 by Bied of the Pavin de Lafarge Company. The initial development was as a result of the search for a cement offering sulfate resistance. The cement was known as "Ciment fondu" and "Ciment électro-fondu" in French.

As indicated by Bied (1922), who was the inventor of this type of cement, the terms "Ciment fondu" ("fused cement") and "Ciment électro-fondu" ("electro-fused cement") refer only to the manufacturing process involving the melting of the base materials (CaO obtained after the decarbonation of CaCO_{3}, and Al_{2}O_{3}). This is because there is no temperature range in which it is possible to observe the gradual softening and clinkerization of these materials, as is the case with Portland cement at around 1450 °C. In the absence of a softening temperature, calcium aluminates are obtained directly by fusion of the precursor materials, and Bied (1922) clearly indicated his preference for the appellation "ciment alumineux" ("aluminous cement") referring to its composition rather than to a manufacturing process.

Subsequently, its other special properties were discovered, and these led to its future in niche applications.

By the 2010s, the product was found in the US market under the name FONDAG cement (FOND Aluminous Aggregate), sometimes referred to as ALAG (ALuminous AGgregate). FONDAG cement is a mix of up to 40 percent alumina, and is stable at high temperatures and thermal cycling from −184–1,093 °C (−300–2,000 °F; 89–1,400 K; 160–2,500 °R)

== Composition ==
CAC cement invented in 1908 by Bied is sulfate-free and hardens to give mainly hydrated calcium aluminates or carboaluminates (AFm phases: Aluminium Ferrite mono-substituted phases), sometimes accompanied with C–S–H as a minor component, while Ca(OH)_{2} (portlandite) is absent. So, CAC cement must not be confused with calcium sulfo-aluminate (CSA) cement containing calcium sulfate and invented later in 1936.

The main constituent, and also the most reactive phase, of calcium aluminate cements is the monocalcium aluminate (CaAl_{2}O_{4} = CaO · Al_{2}O_{3}, also written as CA in the cement chemist notation). It usually contains other calcium aluminates as well as a number of less reactive phases deriving from impurities in the raw materials. Rather a wide range of compositions is encountered, depending on the application and the purity of aluminium source used. Constituents of some typical formulations include:

Oxide/Mineral	General purpose	Buff	White	Refractory
SiO_{2}	4.0	5.0	2.7	0.4
Al_{2}O_{3}	39.4	53.0	62.4	79.6
Fe_{2}O_{3}	16.4	2.0	0.4	0
CaO	38.4	38.0	34.0	19.8
MgO	1.0	0.1	0.1	0
Na_{2}O	0.1	0.1	0	0
K_{2}O	0.2	0	0	0
TiO_{2}	1.9	1.8	0.4	0.1
Monocalcium aluminate	46	70	70	35
Dodecacalcium hepta-aluminate	10	5	0	0
Monocalcium dialuminate	0	0	17	30
Belite	7	5	0	0
Gehlenite	4	14	11	1
Ferrite	24	5	2	0
Pleocroite	1	1	1	0
Wüstite	7	0	0	0
Corundum	0	0	0	33

The mineral phases all take the form of solid solutions with somewhat variable compositions.

== Manufacture ==
The cement is made by fusing together a mixture of a calcium-bearing material (normally calcium oxide from limestone) and an aluminium-bearing material (normally bauxite for general purposes, or refined alumina for white and refractory cements).

The melting of the mixture is achieved at 1600 °C and is energy demanding. The more elevated temperature explains a part of its higher production costs than for the clinker of ordinary Portland cement sintered at 1450 °C.

The liquified mixture cools to a vesicular, basalt-like clinker which is ground alone to produce the finished product. Because complete melting usually takes place, raw materials in lump-form can be used. A typical kiln arrangement comprises a reverberatory furnace provided with a shaft preheater in which the hot exhaust gases pass upward as the lump raw material mix passes downward. The preheater recuperates most of the heat in the combustion gases, dehydrates and de-hydroxylates the bauxite and de-carbonates the limestone. The calcined material drops into the "cool end" of the melt bath. The melt overflows the hot end of the furnace into molds in which it cools and solidifies. The system is fired with pulverized coal or oil. The cooled clinker ingots are crushed and ground in a ball mill. In the case of high-alumina refractory cements, where the mix only sinters, a rotary kiln can be used.

== Hydration reactions ==
CAC cements gain strength more rapidly than ordinary Portland cement (OPC). Sometimes, a retarder is needed to ensure a longer workability.

In contrast to Portland cements, calcium aluminate cements do not release calcium hydroxide (Ca(OH)_{2}, portlandite, or lime) during their hydration.

The hydration reactions of calcium aluminate cements are very complex. The strength-developing phases are monocalcium aluminate (CA), dodeca-calcium hepta-aluminate (C_{12}A_{7}), and belite (C_{2}S), a dicalcium silicate. Calcium aluminoferrite (C_{4}AF), monocalcium dialuminate (CA_{2}), gehlenite, and pleochroite contribute little to the concrete strength.

During the cement setting, the reactive aluminates react with water initially to form a mixture of hydrated phases expressed hereunder in normal oxide notation and also abbreviated in the more compact cement chemist notation (CCN) (CaO = C; Al_{2}O_{3} = A; H_{2}O = H; and SiO_{2} = S):

CaO · Al_{2}O_{3} · 10 H_{2}O (CAH_{10}),
2 CaO · Al_{2}O_{3} · 8 H_{2}O (C_{2}AH_{8}),
3 CaO · Al_{2}O_{3} · 6 H_{2}O (C_{3}AH_{6}), and Al(OH)_{3} gel,

the amounts of each is depending upon the curing temperature.

The first two hydrates subsequently decompose to a mixture of 3 CaO · Al_{2}O_{3} · 6 H_{2}O, Al(OH)_{3} gel, and water, this process being called "conversion". Because of the loss of water, conversion causes an increase in porosity, which can be accompanied by a decrease in concrete strength. This need not be a problem in structural concrete provided that a sufficiently high cement content and a sufficiently low water/cement ratio are employed.

== Structural stability issues: inappropriate use for general construction ==
The inappropriate use of calcium aluminate cements as a common construction material without special precautions has led to structural stability problems in buildings.

On 8 February 1974, the roof of a swimming pool collapsed in the UK. In 1984, the roof of a factory building in Uherské Hradiště in Czechoslovakia (built 1952) collapsed, killing 18 people. In Madrid, Spain, a large housing block nicknamed Korea (because it was built to house Americans during the Korean War), built 1951 ~ 1954 was affected and had to be torn down in 2006. Also in Madrid the Vicente Calderón soccer stadium was affected and had to be partially rebuilt and reinforced.

== Special applications ==
Because of their relatively high cost and delicate implementation, calcium aluminate cements are used in a number of restricted applications where performance achieved justifies costs:

- for some concrete components, for which a rapid strength development is required, even at low temperatures. In this case, a sufficiently high cement content and a sufficiently low water/cement ratio are mandatory to minimize any possible structural stability problems and to increase the concrete durability.
- as a component in blended cement formulations, for various properties such as ultra-rapid strength development and controlled expansion are required.
- in refractory concretes, where strength is required at high temperatures.
- as a protective liner (and repair material) against microbial corrosion such as in sewer infrastructures because of their high resistance to biogenic sulfide corrosion.

== Sewer networks applications ==
The biogenic corrosion resistance of calcium aluminate cements is used today in three main applications:

- Ductile iron pipe for waste water have an internal lining made of calcium aluminate cement mortar.
- Concrete sewage pipes, can be made either with full mass calcium aluminate cement concrete or with an internal liner of calcium aluminate cement mortar.
- Rehabilitation of man-accessible sewer infrastructures with 100% calcium aluminate mortar using one of the following placing methods: low pressure wet spray, spinning head wet spray, or high pressure dry spray (gunite, shotcrete).

== Bibliography ==
- Taylor, Harry F. W. (1997). Cement Chemistry. Thomas Telford. ISBN 978-0-7277-2592-9.
- Hewlett, Peter; Liska, Martin (2019). Lea's Chemistry of Cement and Concrete. Butterworth-Heinemann. ISBN 978-0-08-100795-2.
