= Sodium aluminate =

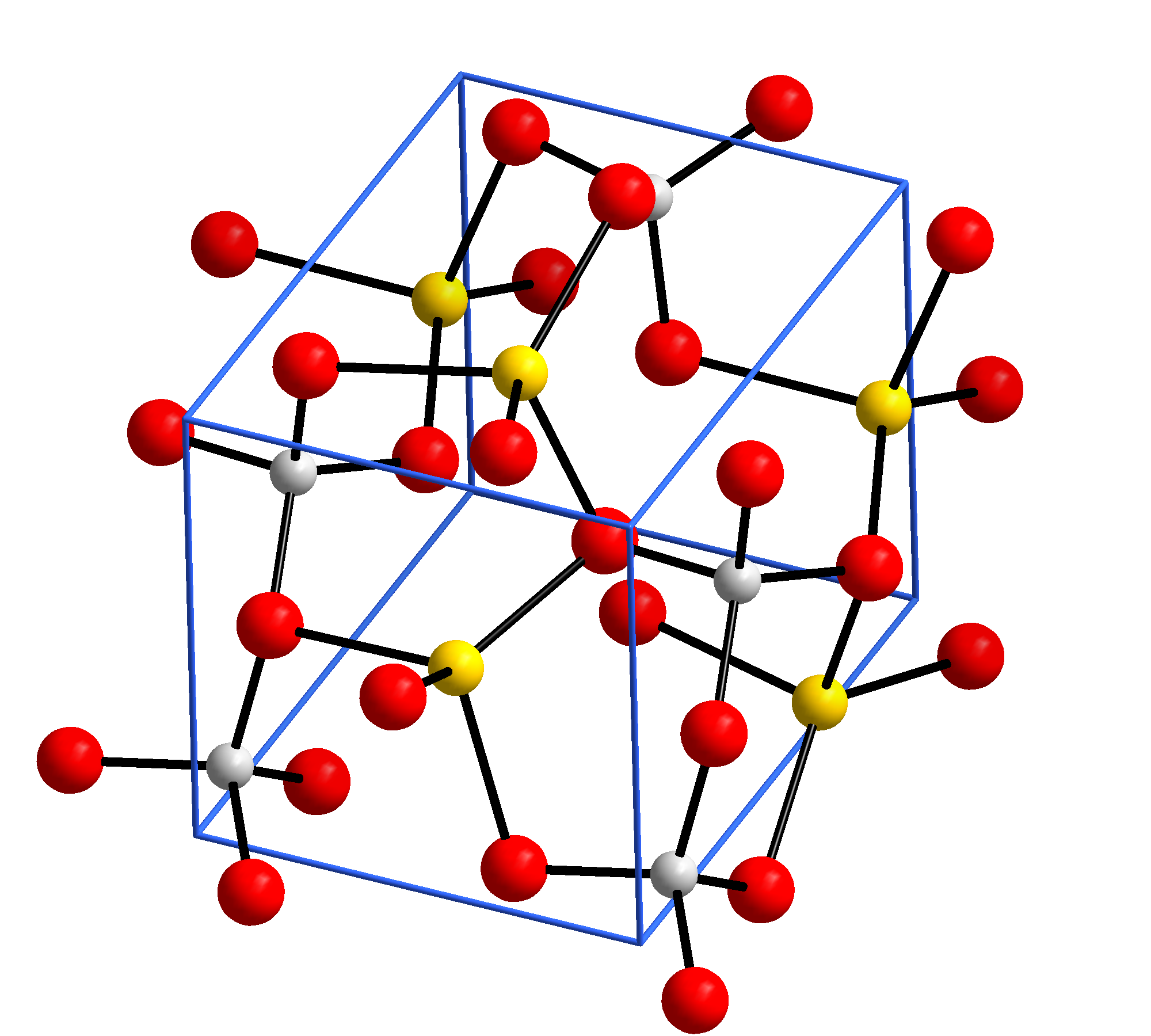
- Crystal structure with sodium in yellow, aluminium in grey, and oxygen in red

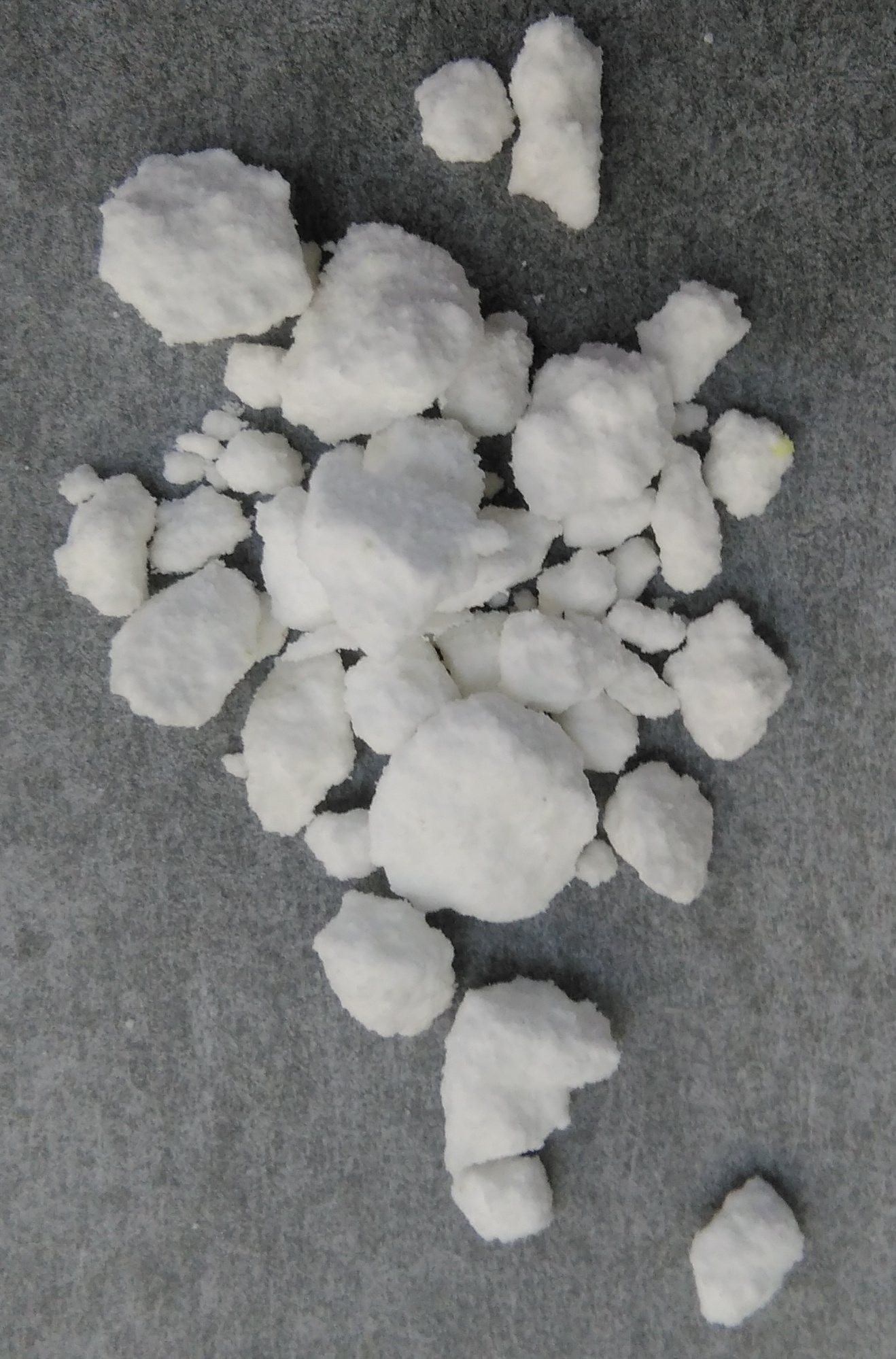
- Sodium metaaluminate sample

Names
- IUPAC name Sodium aluminate
- Other names Sodium aluminium oxide, Sodium metaaluminate Aluminate, ((AlO_{2})^{1−}), sodium

Identifiers
CAS Number	1302-42-7
3D model (JSmol)	Interactive image; hydroxide: Interactive image
ChemSpider	14083; hydroxide: 21781801
ECHA InfoCard	100.013.728
EC Number	215-100-1
PubChem CID	14766
UNII	2VMT26903W
UN number	2812 (SODIUM ALUMINATE, SOLID)
CompTox Dashboard (EPA)	DTXSID90872314 DTXSID3051206, DTXSID90872314
- InChI: InChI=1S/Al.Na.2O/q-1;+1;; Key: IYJYQHRNMMNLRH-UHFFFAOYSA-N; hydroxide: InChI=1S/Al.Na.4H2O/h;;4*1H2/q+3;+1;;;;/p-4 Key: SVEIXENKLWYGIZ-UHFFFAOYSA-J
- SMILES: O=[Al-]=O.[Na+]; hydroxide: O[Al-](O)(O)O.[Na+]

Properties
Chemical formula	NaAlO_{2}
Molar mass	81.97 g/mol
Appearance	white powder (sometimes light-yellowish) hygroscopic/ when dissolved in water a colloidal black solution is formed
Odor	odorless
Density	1.5 g/cm^{3}
Melting point	1,650 °C (3,000 °F; 1,920 K)
Solubility in water	highly soluble
Solubility	Insoluble in alcohol
Refractive index (n_{D})	1.566

Structure
Crystal structure	orthorhombic

Thermochemistry
Heat capacity (C)	73.6 J/mol K
Std molar entropy (S^{⦵}_{298})	70.4 J/mol K
Std enthalpy of formation (Δ_{f}H^{⦵}_{298})	−1133.2 kJ/mol

Hazards
- GHS labelling
Pictograms	(GHS03: Oxidizing) (GHS05: Corrosive)
Signal word	Danger
Hazard statements	H271, H290, H314
Precautionary statements	P210, P220, P234, P260, P264, P264+P265, P280, P283, P301+P330+P331, P302+P361+P354, P304+P340, P305+P354+P338, P306+P360, P316, P317, P321, P363, P370+P378, P371+P380+P375, P390, P405, P420, P501
- Except where otherwise noted, data are given for materials in their standard state (at 25 °C [77 °F], 100 kPa). verify (what is ?) Infobox references

Sodium aluminate is an inorganic chemical that is used as an effective source of aluminium hydroxide for many industrial and technical applications. Pure sodium aluminate (anhydrous) is a white crystalline solid having a formula variously given as NaAlO_{2}, NaAl(OH)_{4} (hydrated), Na_{2}O·Al_{2}O_{3}, or Na_{2}Al_{2}O_{4}. Commercial sodium aluminate is available as a solution or a solid.

Other related compounds, sometimes called sodium aluminate, prepared by reaction of Na_{2}O and Al_{2}O_{3} are Na_{5}AlO_{4} which contains discrete AlO_{4}^{5−} anions, Na_{7}Al_{3}O_{8} and Na_{17}Al_{5}O_{16} which contain complex polymeric anions, and NaAl_{11}O_{17}, once mistakenly believed to be β-alumina, a phase of aluminium oxide.

== Structure ==
Anhydrous sodium aluminate, NaAlO_{2}, contains a three-dimensional framework of corner linked AlO_{4} tetrahedra. The hydrated form NaAlO_{2}·5/4H_{2}O has layers of AlO_{4} tetrahedra joined into rings and the layers are held together by sodium ions and water molecules that hydrogen bond to O atoms in the AlO_{4} tetrahedra.

== Manufacturing ==
Sodium aluminate is manufactured by the dissolution of aluminium hydroxide (Al(OH)_{3}) in a caustic soda (NaOH) solution. Aluminium hydroxide (gibbsite) can be dissolved in 20–25% aqueous NaOH solution at a temperature near the boiling point. The use of more concentrated NaOH solutions leads to a semi-solid product. The process must be carried out in steam-heated vessels of nickel or steel, and the aluminium hydroxide should be boiled with approximately 50% aqueous caustic soda until a pulp forms. The final mixture has to be poured into a tank and cooled; a solid mass containing about 70% NaAlO_{2} then forms. After being crushed, this product is dehydrated in a rotary oven. The resulting product contains 90% NaAlO_{2} and 1% water, together with 1% free NaOH.

== Reaction of aluminium and alkali ==
Sodium aluminate is also formed by the action of sodium hydroxide on elemental aluminium which is an amphoteric metal. The reaction is highly exothermic once established and is accompanied by the rapid evolution of hydrogen gas. The reaction is sometimes written as:

2 Al + 2 NaOH + 2 H_{2}O → 2 NaAlO_{2} + 3 H_{2}

However, the species produced in solution is likely to contain the [Al(OH)_{4}]^{−} ion or perhaps the [Al(H_{2}O)_{2}(OH)_{4}]^{−} ion.

== Uses ==
In water treatment it is used as an adjunct to water softening systems, as a coagulant aid to improve flocculation, and for removing dissolved silica and phosphates.

In construction technology, sodium aluminate is employed to accelerate the solidification of concrete, mainly when working during frost.

Sodium aluminate is also used in the paper industry, for fire brick production, alumina production and so forth.

Sodium aluminate solutions are intermediates in the production of zeolites.

== See also ==
- Bayer process
- Bauxite
