= Ductile iron pipe =

Pipe made of ductile cast iron

Section of DICL pipe (ductile iron concrete lined), commonly used for utility water mains, showing iron casing, concrete lining, and textured polymer protective coatings on the inner and outer surfaces.

Ductile iron pipe is pipe made of ductile cast iron commonly used for potable water transmission and distribution. This type of pipe is a direct development of earlier cast iron pipe, which it has superseded.

== Description ==
The ductile iron used to manufacture the pipe is characterized by the spheroidal or nodular nature of the graphite within the iron. Typically, the pipe is manufactured using centrifugal casting in metal or resin lined moulds. Protective internal linings and external coatings are often applied to ductile iron pipes to inhibit corrosion: the standard internal lining is cement mortar and standard external coatings include bonded zinc, asphalt or water-based paint. In highly corrosive environments loose polyethylene sleeving (LPS) to encase the pipe may also be used.

Life expectancy of unprotected ductile iron pipes depends on the corrosiveness of soil present and tends to be shorter where soil is highly corrosive. However, a lifespan in excess of 100 years has been estimated for ductile iron pipelines installed using "evolved laying practices", including use of properly installed LPS (polyethylene encasement). Studies of ductile iron pipe's environmental impact have differing findings regarding emissions and energy consumed. Ductile iron pipe manufactured in the US has been certified as a sustainable product by the Institute for Market Transformation to Sustainability.

== Dimensions ==
Ductile iron pipe is sized according to a dimensionless term known as the Pipe Size or Nominal Diameter (known by its French abbreviation, DN). This is roughly equivalent to the pipe's internal diameter in inches or millimeters. However, it is the external diameter of the pipe that is kept constant between changes in wall thickness, in order to maintain compatibility in joints and fittings. Consequently, the internal diameter varies, sometimes significantly, from its nominal size.

Pipe dimensions are standardised to the mutually incompatible AWWA C151 (US Customary Units) in the United States, ISO 2531 / EN 545/598 (metric) in Europe, and AS/NZS 2280 (metric) in Australia and New Zealand. Although both metric, European and Australian are not compatible and pipes of identical nominal diameters have quite different dimensions.

=== North America ===
In the US, nominal pipe sizes vary from 3 inches up to 64 inches, in increments of at least 1 inch, and are standardised according to the American AWWA C-151

Pipe Size	Outside Diameter [in (mm)]
3	3.96 (100.584)
4	4.80 (121.92)
6	6.90 (175.26)
8	9.05 (229.87)
10	11.10 (281.94)
12	13.20 (335.28)
14	15.30 (388.62)
16	17.40 (441.96)
18	19.50 (495.3)
20	21.60 (548.64)
24	25.80 (655.32)
30	32.00 (812.8)

=== Europe ===
European pipe is standardized to ISO 2531 and its descendent specifications EN 545 (potable water) and EN 598 (sewage). European pipes are sized to approximately match the internal diameter of the pipe, following internal lining, to the nominal diameter. ISO 2531 maintains dimensional compatibility with older German cast iron pipes. Older British pipes, however, which used the incompatible imperial standard, BS 78, require adapter pieces when connecting to newly installed pipe. Coincidentally, the British harmonization with European pipe standards occurred at approximately the same time as its transition to ductile iron, so almost all cast iron pipe is imperial and all ductile pipe is metric.

DN	Outside Diameter [mm (in)]	Wall thickness [mm (in)]		
DN	Outside Diameter [mm (in)]	Class 40	K9	K10
40	56 (2.205)	4.8 (0.189)	6.0 (0.236)	6.0 (0.236)
50	66 (2.598)	4.8 (0.189)	6.0 (0.236)	6.0 (0.236)
60	77 (3.031)	4.8 (0.189)	6.0 (0.236)	6.0 (0.236)
65	82 (3.228)	4.8 (0.189)	6.0 (0.236)	6.0 (0.236)
80	98 (3.858)	4.8 (0.189)	6.0 (0.236)	6.0 (0.236)
100	118 (4.646)	4.8 (0.189)	6.0 (0.236)	6.0 (0.236)
125	144 (5.669)	4.8 (0.189)	6.0 (0.236)	6.0 (0.236)
150	170 (6.693)	5.0 (0.197)	6.0 (0.236)	6.5 (0.256)
200	222 (8.740)	5.4 (0.213)	6.3 (0.248)	7.0 (0.276)
250	274 (10.787)	5.8 (0.228)	6.8 (0.268)	7.5 (0.295)
300	326 (12.835)	6.2 (0.244)	7.2 (0.283)	8.0 (0.315)
350	378 (14.882)	7.0 (0.276)	7.7 (0.303)	8.5 (0.335)
400	429 (16.890)	7.8 (0.307)	8.1 (0.319)	9.0 (0.354)
450	480 (18.898)	–	8.6 (0.339)	9.5 (0.374)
500	532 (20.945)	–	9.0 (0.354)	10.0 (0.394)
600	635 (25.000)	–	9.9 (0.390)	11.1 (0.437)
700	738 (29.055)	–	10.9 (0.429)	12.0 (0.472)
800	842 (33.150)	–	11.7 (0.461)	13.0 (0.512)
900	945 (37.205)	–	12.9 (0.508)	14.1 (0.555)
1000	1,048 (41.260)	–	13.5 (0.531)	15.0 (0.591)
1100	1,152 (45.354)	–	14.4 (0.567)	16.0 (0.630)
1200	1,255 (49.409)	–	15.3 (0.602)	17.0 (0.669)
1400	1,462 (57.559)	–	17.1 (0.673)	19.0 (0.748)
1500	1,565 (61.614)	–	18.0 (0.709)	20.0 (0.787)
1600	1,668 (65.669)	–	18.9 (0.744)	51.0 (2.008)
1800	1,875 (73.819)	–	20.7 (0.815)	23.0 (0.906)
2000	2,082 (81.969)	–	22.5 (0.886)	25.0 (0.984)

Other European Standards give specifications on more dedicated products:

EN 15655:2009 – Ductile iron pipes, fittings and accessories – Internal polyurethane lining for pipes and fittings – Requirements and test methods

EN 877:1999/A1:2006 – Cast iron pipes and fittings, their joints and accessories for the evacuation of water from buildings – Requirements, test methods and quality assurance

CEN/TR 15545:2006 – Guide to the use of EN 545

CEN/TR 16017:2010 – Guide to the use of EN 598

EN 877:1999 – Cast iron pipes and fittings, their joints and accessories for the evacuation of water from buildings – Requirements, test methods and quality assurance

EN 877:1999/A1:2006/AC:2008 – Cast iron pipes and fittings, their joints and accessories for the evacuation of water from buildings – Requirements, test methods and quality assurance

EN 598:2007+A1:2009 – Ductile iron pipes, fittings, accessories and their joints for sewerage applications – Requirements and test methods

EN 12842:2012 – Ductile iron fittings for PVC-U or PE piping systems – Requirements and test methods

CEN/TR 16470:2013 – Environmental aspects of ductile iron pipe systems for water and sewerage applications

EN 14628:2005 – Ductile iron pipes, fittings and accessories – External polyethylene coating for pipes – Requirements and test methods

EN 15189:2006 – Ductile iron pipes, fittings and accessories – External polyurethane coating for pipes – Requirements and test methods

EN 14901:2014 – Ductile iron pipes, fittings and accessories – Epoxy coating (heavy duty) of ductile iron fittings and accessories – Requirements and test methods

EN 969:2009 – Ductile iron pipes, fittings, accessories and their joints for gas pipelines – Requirements and test methods

EN 15542:2008 – Ductile iron pipes, fittings and accessories – External cement mortar coating for pipes – Requirements and test methods

EN 545:2010 – Ductile iron pipes, fittings, accessories and their joints for water pipelines – Requirements and test methods

EN 14525:2004 – Ductile iron wide tolerance couplings and flange adaptors for use with pipes of different materials: ductile iron, Grey iron, Steel, PVC-U PE, Fibre-cement

=== Australia and New Zealand ===
Australian and New Zealand pipes are sized to an independent specification, AS/NZS 2280, that is not compatible with European pipes even though the same nomenclature is used.

Australia adopted at an early point the imperial British cast iron pipe standard BS 78, and when this was retired on British adoption of ISO 2531, rather than similarly harmonizing with Europe, Australia opted for a "soft" conversion from imperial units to metric, published as AS/NSZ 2280, with the physical outer diameters remaining unchanged, allowing continuity of manufacture and backwards compatibility. Therefore, the inner diameters of lined pipe differ widely from the nominal diameter, and hydraulic calculations require specific knowledge of the pipe standard.

Nominal Size (DN)	Outside Diameter [mm (in)]	Nominal Wall Thickness [mm (in)]		Flange Class
Nominal Size (DN)	Outside Diameter [mm (in)]	PN 20	PN 35	Flange Class
100	122 (4.803)	–	5.0 (0.197)	7.0
150	177 (6.969)	–	5.0 (0.197)	8.0
200	232 (9.134)	–	5.0 (0.197)	8.0
225	259 (10.197)	5.0 (0.197)	5.2 (0.205)	9.0
250	286 (11.260)	5.0 (0.197)	5.6 (0.220)	9.0
300	345 (13.583)	5.0 (0.197)	6.3 (0.248)	10.0
375	426 (16.772)	5.1 (0.201)	7.3 (0.287)	10.0
450	507 (19.961)	5.6 (0.220)	8.3 (0.327)	11.0
500	560 (22.047)	6.0 (0.236)	9.0 (0.354)	12.0
600	667 (26.260)	6.8 (0.268)	10.3 (0.406)	13.0
750	826 (32.520)	7.9 (0.311)	12.2 (0.480)	15.0

== Joints ==
Individual lengths of ductile iron pipe are joined either by flanges, couplings, or some form of spigot and socket arrangement.

=== Flanges ===
Flanges are flat rings around the end of pipes which mate with an equivalent flange from another pipe, the two being held together by bolts usually passed through holes drilled through the flanges. A deformable gasket, usually elastomeric, placed between raised faces on the mating flanges provides the seal. Flanges are designed to a large number of specifications that differ because of dimensional variations in pipes sizes and pressure requirements, and because of independent standards development. In the US, flanges are either threaded or welded onto the pipe. In the European market flanges are usually welded onto the pipe. In the US, flanges are available in a standard 125 lb bolt pattern as well as a 250 lb (and heavier) bolt pattern (steel bolt pattern). Both are usually rated at 250 psi (1,700 kPa). A flanged joint is rigid and can bear both tension and compression as well as a limited degree of shear and bending. It also can be dismantled after assembly. Due to the rigid nature of the joint and the risk of excessive bending moment being imposed, it is advised that flanged pipework not be buried.

Current flange standards used in the water industry are ANSI B16.1 in the US, EN 1092 in Europe, and AS/NZS 4087 in Australia and New Zealand.

=== Spigot and socket ===
Spigot and sockets involve a normal pipe end, the spigot, being inserted into the socket or bell of another pipe or fitting with a seal being made between the two within the socket. Normal spigot and socket joints do not allow direct metal to metal contact with all forces being transmitted through the elastomeric seal. They can consequently flex and allow some degree of rotation, allowing pipes to shift and relieve stresses imposed by soil movement. The corollary is that unrestrained spigot and socket joints transmit essentially no compression or tension along the axis of the pipe and little shear. Any bends, tees or valves therefore require either a restrained joint or, more commonly, thrust blocks, which transmit the forces as compression into the surrounding soil.

A large number of different socket and seals exist. The most modern is the "push-joint" or "slip-joint", whereby the socket and rubber seal is designed to allow the pipe spigot to be, after lubrication, simply pushed into the socket. Push joints remain proprietary designs. Also available are locking gasket systems. These locking gasket systems allow the pipe to be pushed together but do not allow the joint to come apart without using a special tool or torch on the gasket.

The earliest spigot and socket cast iron pipes were jointed by filling the socket with a mixture of water, sand, iron filings and sal-ammoniac (ammonium chloride.) A gasket ring was pushed into the socket round the spigot to contain the mixture which was pounded into the socket with a caulking tool and then pointed off. This took several weeks to set and produced a completely rigid joint. Such pipe systems are often to be seen in nineteenth century churches in the heating system.

== Lifespan and corrosion ==
In the late 1950s, ductile iron pipe was introduced to the marketplace, featuring higher strength and similar corrosion resistance compared to cast iron. According to a 2004 study, an expected lifespan of 100 years is likely for ductile iron pipe, based on test results, field inspections and in-service operations over 50 years. In 2012, the American Water Works Association reported that ductile iron pipes in benign soil or installed in more aggressive soils using "evolved laying practices" had an estimated life up to 110 years, based on a nationwide analysis of water pipes in the US.

Like most ferrous materials, ductile iron is susceptible to corrosion, therefore its useful life depends on the impact of corrosion. Corrosion can occur in two ways in ductile iron pipes: graphitization, the leaching away of iron content through corrosion leading to a generally weakened pipe structure, and corrosion pitting, which is a more localized effect also causing weakening of the pipe structure.

Over the last 100 years, the average thickness of iron pipes has decreased due to increased metal strength, through metallurgical advancements as well as improved casting technique.

=== Methods for mitigating corrosion ===
The potential for corrosion, leading to pipe failure, is significantly impacted by the corrosivity of soil. Unprotected pipes in highly corrosive soil tend to have shorter lifespans. The lifespan of ductile iron pipe installed in an aggressive environment without appropriate protection may be between 21 and 40 years. The introduction of corrosion mitigation methods for ductile pipe, including the use of polyethylene sleeving, can reduce corrosion by controlling the effect of corrosive soil on piping.

In the United States, the American National Standards Institute and American Water Works Association have standardized the use of polyethylene sleeving to protect ductile iron pipe from the effects of corrosion. A 2003 report by researchers from the National Research Council of Canada noted that "both good and poor performances" of polyethylene sleeving had been reported. However, a study in the Ductile Iron Pipe Research Association's Florida test site found that, compared with uncoated pipes exposed to a corrosive environment, pipes encased in loose polyethylene sleeving were "in excellent condition".

Based on a 2005 meta analysis of 1,379 pipe specimens, loose polyethylene sleeving was found to be highly effective at mitigating corrosion. The only environment for which the analysis found the polyethylene sleeving did not provide effective corrosion control was for "uniquely severe" environments, a classification of a rare but extremely corrosive environment. The analysis found that a lifespan of 37 years could be expected in these "uniquely severe" environments.

Pipes manufactured under International Organization for Standardization (ISO) standards are typically coated with zinc, to provide protection against corrosion. In instances of more aggressive soils, polyethylene sleeving is installed over the zinc coated pipe to provide added protection.

Cathodic protection may also be used to prevent corrosion and tends to be advocated by corrosion engineers for pipes in corrosive soils as an addition to external dielectric coatings.

Engineers and water authorities in the United States are divided on the use of different coatings or cathodic protection. Mixed results have been found for all methods of protection. However, this may be due to the impact of variations in local soil corrosiveness and temperature or by damage occurring during installation, which can impact effectiveness of protective coatings.

== Internal linings ==
Ductile iron pipe is highly resistant to internal corrosion in potable water and less aggressive forms of sewage because of the linings applied during manufacturing. Tuberculation, or the deposition of corrosion products on the internal pipe wall has largely been eliminated by the cement mortar lining which provides a physical and chemical barrier to the corrosive water. The first cement lined iron pipe was installed in Charleston, South Carolina, in 1922 and provided 100 years of free-flowing service until the mains were replaced during a routine upgrade to the city's infrastructure in 2022.

=== Polyurethane (PUR) ===
Polyurethane is an option offered as an internal lining for ductile iron pipes in lieu of cement mortar. However, as PUR provides only passive protection it becomes vitally important that the coating is not damaged during handling and installation. Manufacturers will specify strict handling, transport and installation procedures to ensure PUR coatings are protected. If pipes are deformed Polyurethane's elasticity, does in some situations allow the coating to remain intact. Corrosion Experts

Polyurethane coatings were first used in 1972. In comparison with other coatings, the internal polyurethane lining exhibits a high resistance to various different media such as drinking water, wastewater, de-mineralised water, industrial water and gas, as well as to aggressive solutions such as sulphuric acid.

Polyurethane is a thermosetting plastic with no solvents, with a three-dimensionally linked molecular structure giving it mechanical stability. The polyurethane lining used for internal coating has the following standard properties is standardised by EN 15655:2009 (Ductile iron pipes, fittings and accessories – Internal polyurethane lining for pipes and fittings – Requirements and test methods).

=== Cement mortar ===
The predominant form of lining for water applications is cement mortar centrifugally applied during manufacturing. The cement mortar comprises a mixture of cement and sand to a ratio of between 1:2 and 1:3.5. For potable water, portland cement is used; for sewage it is common to use sulfate resisting or high alumina cement.

Cement mortar linings have been found to dramatically reduce internal corrosion. A DIPRA survey has demonstrated that the Hazen-Williams factor of cement lining remains between 130 and 151 with only slight reduction with age.

== External coatings ==
Unprotected ductile iron, similarly to cast iron, is intrinsically resistant to corrosion in most, although not all, soils. Nonetheless, because of frequent lack of information on soil aggressiveness and to extend the installed life of buried pipe, ductile iron pipe is commonly protected by one or more external coatings. In the US and Australia, loose polyethylene sleeving is preferred. In Europe, standards recommend a more sophisticated system of directly bonded zinc coatings overlaid by a finishing layer be used in conjunction with polyethylene sleeving.

=== Loose Polyethylene Sleeving (LPS) ===
Loose Polyethylene sleeving was first developed by CIPRA (since 1979, DIPRA) in the US in 1951 for use in highly corrosive soil. It was employed more widely in the US in the late 1950s and first employed in the UK in 1965 and Australia in the mid-1960s. Loose Polyethylene Sleeving (LPS) remains as one of the most cost effective corrosion protection methods available today with a proven track record for reliability and effectiveness.

LPS comprises a loose sleeve of polyethylene that completely wraps the pipe, including the bells of any joints. The sleeving inhibits corrosion by a number of mechanisms. It physically separates the pipe from soil particles, preventing direct galvanic corrosion. By providing an impermeable barrier to ground water, the sleeve also inhibits the diffusion of oxygen to the ductile iron surface and limits the availability of electrolytes that would accelerate corrosion. It provides a homogeneous environment along the pipe surface so that corrosion occurs evenly over the pipe. The sleeve also restricts the availability of nutrients which could support sulfate-reducing bacteria, inhibiting microbially induced corrosion. LPS is not designed to be completely water-tight but rather to greatly restrict the movement of water to and from the pipe surface. Water present beneath the sleeve and in contact with the pipe surface is rapidly deoxygenated and depleted of nutrients and forms a stable environment in which limited further corrosion occurs. An improperly installed sleeve that continues to allow the free flow of ground water is not effective in inhibiting corrosion.

Polyethylene sleeves are available in a number of materials. The most common contemporary compositions are linear low-density polyethylene film which requires an 8 mil or 200 μm thickness and high-density cross-laminated polyethylene film which requires only a 4 mil or 100 μm thickness. The latter may or may not be reinforced with a scrim layer.

Polyethylene sleeving does have limitations. In European practice, its use in the absence of additional zinc and epoxy protective coatings is discouraged where natural soil resistivity is below 750 ohm/cm. Where resistivity is below 1500 ohm/cm and where the pipe is installed at or below the water table, where there are additional artificial soil contaminants and particularly stray currents again it is recommended for use in addition to zinc and epoxy coating. Because of the vulnerability of polyethylene to UV degradation, sleeving, or sleeved pipe should not be stored in sunlight, although carbon pigments included in the sleeving can provide some limited protection.

Polyethylene sleeving is standardised according to ISO 8180 internationally, AWWA C105 in the US, BS 6076 in the UK, and AS 3680 and AS 3681 in Australia.

=== Zinc ===
In Europe and Australia, ductile iron pipe is typically manufactured with a zinc coating overlaid by either a bituminous, polymeric, or epoxy finishing layer. EN 545/598 mandates a minimum zinc content of 200 g/m^{2} (at 99.99% purity) and a minimum average finishing layer thickness of 70 μm (with local minimum of 50 μm). AS/NZS 2280 mandates a minimum zinc content of 200 g/m^{2} (with a local minimum of 180 g/m^{2} at 99.99% purity) and a minimum average finishing layer thickness of 80 μm.

No current AWWA standards are available for bonded coatings (zinc, coal tar epoxy, tape-wrap systems as seen on steel pipe) for ductile iron pipe, DIPRA does not endorse bonded coatings, and AWWA M41 generally views them unfavourably, recommending they be used only in conjunction with cathodic protection.

=== Bituminous coatings ===
Zinc coatings are generally not employed in the US. In order to protect ductile iron pipe prior to installation, pipe is instead supplied with a temporary 1 mil or 25 μm thick bituminous coating. This coating is not intended to provide protection once the pipe is installed.

== Water based pipe coatings ==
Water based pipe coatings, are an environmentally friendly coating that is applied to the inner & outer diameter of ductile iron pipe. They protect against corrosion from the outside and inside, and also protect the product from contamination. The coating is an emulsion manufactured using asphaltene and water primarily, with other raw materials according to the manufacturer's specifications.

They came in use in the early 1990s, replacing coatings based on dangerous and environmental harmful solvents, such as benzenes, toluenes, hexanes and other volatile organic compounds.

== Industry associations and market ==
In the United States, the Ductile Iron Pipe Research Association represents manufacturers of ductile iron pipe. The association provides research on and promotes the use of ductile iron piping in utility projects (water and sewer), focusing on its strength, recyclability and life cycle cost compared with alternative products such as PVC. The US industry is also represented by the National Association of Pipe Fabricators. Outside of the US, the ductile iron pipe industry is supported by associations including the European Association for Ductile Iron Pipe Systems.

After the 2008 financial crisis, the pipe industry as a whole, experienced a decrease in sales in the US due to municipalities deferring replacement of water mains and reduction in new home construction. According to a report published by The Freedonia Group in 2011, economic recovery from the 2008 crisis is likely to expand ductile iron's market share in the large diameter pipe market.

== Environmental impact ==
Ductile iron pipe in the developed world is normally manufactured exclusively from recycled material including scrap steel and recycled iron. The pipe can be recycled after use.

In terms of environmental impact, several studies have compared ductile iron pipe's impact on the environment with that of other pipe materials. A study by Jeschar et al. in 1995 compared the energy use and carbon dioxide (CO_{2}) emissions produced in manufacturing pipes of various materials including concrete, ductile iron, cast iron and PVC, based on pipes with nominal diameter of 100 mm to 500 mm. The energy consumed in manufacturing ductile iron pipe was 19.55 MJ per kg and volume of emissions released during manufacture was 1.430 kg CO_{2} per kg, compared to 68.30 MJ per kg of energy and 4.860 kg CO_{2} per kg emissions for PVC pipes, and 1.24 MJ per kg and 0.148 kg CO_{2} per kg for concrete pipes of the same diameter.

Another study the following year, by the Forschungsinstitut für Chemie und Umwelt, had similar findings. However, it also took the lifetime of pipes into account. This study found improved environmental performance for ductile iron pipe in terms of energy consumed and emissions produced during manufacture due to its longer life span. A more recent study, published August 2012, by Du et al., carried out a life cycle analysis on six types materials used for water and waste water pipes, including ductile iron, PVC, high-density polyethylene (HDPE) and concrete. They found that at diameters of ≤ 24 in, ductile iron pipe had the highest "global warming potential" based on emissions from manufacturing, transportation and installation. At larger diameters, ≥ 30 in, ductile iron pipe had a lower "global warming potential", while PVC had the highest.

According to a 2008 study by Koo et al., ductile iron pipe had the lowest impact on natural resource depletion, compared to HDPE pipe and PVC pipe.

In November 2012, ductile iron pipe manufactured in the United States received certification as a sustainable product from the Institute for Market Transformation to Sustainability.
