= Krotite =

Natural mineral

General
- Category: Oxide mineral
- Formula: CaAl_{2}O_{4}
- IMA symbol: Kro
- Crystal system: Monoclinic
- Crystal class: Prismatic (2/m) (same H-M symbol)
- Space group: P2_{1}/n
- Unit cell: a = 8.6996(3) Å b = 8.0994(3) Å c = 15.2170(11) Å β = 90.188(6)°; Z = 12

Identification
- Color: Colorless
- Mohs scale hardness: 6.5
- Luster: Vitreous
- Streak: White
- Diaphaneity: Transparent
- Specific gravity: 2.94

Krotite is a natural mineral composed of calcium, aluminium and oxygen, with the molecular formula CaAl_{2}O_{4}. It is the low-pressure dimorph of CaAl_{2}O_{4}, of which the high-pressure dimorph is named dmitryivanovite.

Krotite was reported in 2011 in a calcium-aluminium-rich inclusion (CAI) in the carbonaceous chondrite meteorite NWA (North West Africa) 1934, which landed in Morocco. The mineral name was approved by the International Mineralogical Association (IMA 2010-038) and honors Alexander N. Krot, a researcher in cosmochemistry at the University of Hawaii at Manoa in Honolulu, Hawaii.

Researchers have found that the mineral, which has the same atomic arrangement as a man-made component of some types of concrete (specifically, calcium aluminate cements), forms under low pressure at a temperature of at least 1,500 °C (2,730 °F). These conditions of high temperature and low pressure are consistent with a hypothesis that the krotite grains found in the meteorite formed as high-temperature condensates from the solar nebula from which the Solar System formed, approximately 4.6 billion years ago. Thus, they are likely to be among the earliest minerals formed in the Solar System.

The CAI containing the krotite was said to resemble a "cracked egg" because its rim was crosscut by cracks filled with iron and aluminum hydroxides. Researchers suggest that the mineral assemblage in the CAI was at one time surrounded by a hot gas that reacted with krotite crystals on the surface of the CAI. It is likely that cracks on this rim of the CAI were filled with hydrated oxides as a result of weathering that occurred after the meteorite landed on Earth.

Associated minerals include perovskite, gehlenite, hercynite, mayenite, grossite, hibonite, spinel and diopside.

== See also ==
- Glossary of meteoritics
