= Microbial corrosion =

Corrosion caused or promoted by microorganisms

Microbial corrosion, also known as microbiologically influenced corrosion (MIC), microbially induced corrosion (MIC) or biocorrosion, occurs when microbes affect the electrochemical environment of the surface on which they are fixed. This usually involves the formation of a biofilm, which can either increase the corrosion of the surface or, in a process called microbial corrosion inhibition, protect the surface from corrosion.

As every surface exposed to the environment is in some way also exposed to microbes, microbial corrosion causes trillions of dollars in damage around the globe annually.

Microbes can locally create hypoxic conditions at the metal surface under a biofilm and contribute to the formation of anodic (oxidation) and cathodic (reduction) sites initiating electrochemical potential differences and electrochemical corrosion. They can also act by either releasing byproducts from their cellular metabolism that corrode metals, or preventing normal corrosion inhibitors from functioning and leaving surfaces open to attack from other environmental factors.

== Bacteria ==
Some sulfate-reducing bacteria produce hydrogen sulfide, which can cause sulfide stress cracking. Acidithiobacillus bacteria produce sulfuric acid; Acidothiobacillus thiooxidans frequently damages sewer pipes. Ferrobacillus ferrooxidans directly oxidizes iron to iron oxides and iron hydroxides; the rusticles forming on the RMS Titanic wreck are caused by bacterial activity. Other bacteria produce various acids, both organic and mineral, or ammonia.

In presence of oxygen, aerobic bacteria like Acidithiobacillus thiooxidans, Thiobacillus thioparus, and Thiobacillus concretivorus, all three widely present in the environment, are the common corrosion-causing factors resulting in biogenic sulfide corrosion.

Without presence of oxygen, anaerobic bacteria, especially Desulfovibrio and Desulfotomaculum, are common. Desulfovibrio salixigens requires at least 2.5% concentration of sodium chloride, but D. vulgaris and D. desulfuricans can grow in both fresh and salt water. D. africanus is another common corrosion-causing microorganism. The genus Desulfotomaculum comprises sulfate-reducing spore-forming bacteria; Dtm. orientis and Dtm. nigrificans are involved in corrosion processes. Sulfate-reducers require a reducing environment; an electrode potential lower than −100 mV is required for them to thrive. However, even a small amount of produced hydrogen sulfide can achieve this shift, so the growth, once started, tends to accelerate.

Layers of anaerobic bacteria can exist in the inner parts of the corrosion deposits, while the outer parts are inhabited by aerobic bacteria.

Some bacteria are able to utilize hydrogen formed during cathodic corrosion processes.

Bacterial colonies and deposits can form concentration cells, causing and enhancing galvanic corrosion.

Bacterial corrosion may appear in form of pitting corrosion, for example in pipelines of the oil and gas industry. Anaerobic corrosion is evident as layers of metal sulfides and hydrogen sulfide smell. On cast iron, a graphitic corrosion selective leaching may be the result, with iron being consumed by the bacteria, leaving graphite matrix with low mechanical strength in place.

Various corrosion inhibitors can be used to combat microbial corrosion. Formulae based on benzalkonium chloride are common in oilfield industry.

Microbial corrosion can also apply to plastics, concrete, and many other materials. Two examples are Nylon-eating bacteria and Plastic-eating bacteria.

== Fungi ==
Fungi can cause microbial corrosion of concrete. With adequate environmental factors, such as humidity, temperature, and organic carbon sources, fungi will produce colonies on concrete. Some fungi can reproduce asexually. This common process among fungi allows many new fungal spores to quickly spread to new environments, developing entire colonies where nothing existed. These colonies and the new spores produced use hyphae to absorb environmental nutrients.

Hyphae are incredibly tiny and thin, growing only 2 to 6 micrometers in diameter. Fungal hyphae are used to reach deep into minuscule holes, cracks, and ravines in concrete. These areas contain moisture and nutrients the fungus survives on. As more hyphae force their way into these tiny cracks and crevices, the pressure causes those gaps to expand, similar to how water freezes in tiny holes and cracks, causing them to widen. The mechanical pressure enables cracks to expand, leading to more moisture getting inside, and thus, the fungi have more nutrients, allowing them to travel deeper into the concrete structure. By altering their environment, fungi break down concrete and its alkaline layer, thus providing ideal conditions for corrosion-causing bacteria to further degrade concrete structures.

Another way fungi cause corrosion on concrete is through organic acids naturally produced by the fungi. These organic acids chemically react with Calcium 2+ in the concrete which produces water-soluble salts as a product. The Calcium 2+ is then released, causing extensive damage over time to the structure. Due to the fact that fungi expel digestive juices to gain nutrients, the structure they grow on will begin to dissolve. This is no different for concrete when fungi such as Fusarium take root. An experiment compared the corrosion of the bacteria Tiobacillus to the corrosion of a fungus called Fusarium. In the experiment, both groups of organisms were provided with adequate conditions to grow, along with an equal piece of concrete in each experiment. After 147 days, the Tiobacillus bacterium caused an 18% mass reduction. However, the Fusarium fungus caused a 24% mass reduction in the same time frame, thus showcasing its corrosive abilities.

Bhattacharyya did a study on the three separate types of fungi that are known to cause concrete corrosion: Aspergillus tamarii, Aspergillus niger, and Fusarium. Aspergillus tamarii was the most destructive of the three fungi. It causes cracks to widen and deepen, quickly and efficiently takes root, and promotes calcium oxalate. By causing calcium oxalate, there is an increase in the speed of calcium ion leaching, which lowers the overall strength of concrete. In 90 days, exposure to the fungus resulted in a mass reduction of 7.2% in the concrete. Aspergillus niger was the second worst offender out of the three, followed by Fusarium, which can lower the mass of concrete by 6.2 grams in a single year, as well as cause the pH to down from 12 to 8 in the same time frame.

== Aviation fuel ==
Hydrocarbon utilizing microorganisms, mostly Cladosporium resinae and Pseudomonas aeruginosa and sulfate reducing bacteria, colloquially known as "HUM bugs", are commonly present in jet fuel. They live in the water-fuel interface of the water droplets, form dark black/brown/green, gel-like mats, and cause microbial corrosion to plastic and rubber parts of the aircraft fuel system by consuming them, and to the metal parts by the means of their acidic metabolic products. They are also incorrectly called algae due to their appearance. FSII, is added to fuel as a growth retardant. There are about 250 kinds of bacteria that can live in jet fuel, but fewer than a dozen are meaningfully harmful.

== Nuclear waste ==
Microorganisms can negatively affect radioactive elements confined in nuclear waste.

== Concrete ==
Multiple factors produced by the environment stimulate the corrosion and deterioration of concrete, such as freezing conditions, radiation exposure, and extensive heat cycles or freeze-thaw and wet-dry cycles. Cycles that cause mechanical breakdowns of concrete, such as freeze-thaw cycles, are incredibly ruinous. All these provide ways for microbes to take over, further eroding and weakening structures made of concrete. An uptick in damages on urbanized sewer systems and cities that line the coast has forced people to look further in-depth at how to preserve concrete from microbes.

To halt the damage done by microbes, a complete comprehension of corrosion-causing microbes must be undertaken. This includes knowing what the specific microbes and their community are made up of and how they break down structural concrete. Environmental stressors on structures often promote microbial corrosion caused by bacteria, Archaea, algae, and fungi. These microorganisms depend on their environment to provide proper moisture, pH levels, and resources that allow reproduction.

The pH level of concrete greatly influences what microbes can reproduce and how much damage is done to the concrete. A concrete surface is alkaline, making it difficult for microbes to germinate. However, chemical processes by the environment and microorganisms themselves cause changes in the concrete. Environmental conditions combined with carbonization caused by select microbes fabricate negative changes in the pH of the concrete. These few microbes can excrete metabolites that change the pH from 12 to 8. With a lower pH level, more microorganisms can survive on the concrete, thus quickening the corrosion rate. This becomes an extreme problem, as many microbes that attack concrete survive in anaerobic conditions. Sewers, for example, have low oxygen levels and are high in nitrogen and sulfuric gas, making them perfect for microbes that metabolize those gases.

== Sewerage ==
Sewer network structures are prone to biodeterioration of materials due to the action of some microorganisms associated to the sulfur cycle. It can be a severely damaging phenomenon which was firstly described by Olmstead and Hamlin in 1900 for a brick sewer located in Los Angeles. Jointed mortar between the bricks disintegrated and ironwork was heavily rusted. The mortar joint had ballooned to two to three times its original volume, leading to the destruction or the loosening of some bricks.

Around 9% of damages described in sewer networks can be ascribed to the successive action of two kinds of microorganisms. Sulfate-reducing bacteria (SRB) can grow in relatively thick layers of sedimentary sludge and sand (typically 1 mm thick) accumulating at the bottom of the pipes and characterized by anoxic conditions. They can grow using oxidized sulfur compounds present in the effluent as electron acceptor and excrete hydrogen sulfide (H_{2}S). This gas is then emitted in the aerial part of the pipe and can impact the structure in two ways: either directly by reacting with the material and leading to a decrease in pH, or indirectly through its use as a nutrient by sulfur-oxidizing bacteria (SOB), growing in oxic conditions, which produce biogenic sulfuric acid. The structure is then submitted to a biogenic sulfuric acid attack. Materials like calcium aluminate cements, PVC or vitrified clay pipe may be substituted for ordinary concrete or steel sewers that are not resistant in these environments. Mild steel corrosion reduction in water by uptake of dissolved oxygen is carried out by Rhodotorula mucilaginosa(7).

== Inhibition of microbial corrosion ==
Many methods have been developed for the restriction of microbial corrosion. The primary challenge has been finding ways to prevent or stop microbial growth without negatively impacting the surrounding environment. The list below provides an overview of some of the tactics that have been used or that are in development.

- Using biocide (any chemical that inhibits life) to kill microorganisms. Because biofilms are so resistant, a lot of biocide must be used. This is expensive, has negative effects on the surrounding environment, and can actually cause more corrosion of the surface due to its toxicity. Biocides and other chemical treatments against microbes also tend to be dangerous for the people preparing and applying them.

Rao and Mulky developed an extensive list of methods to limit the growth of microbes and therefore microbial corrosion.

- Plant products could aid in restricting microbial growth. These would be biodegradable and safe for the people applying them, but have not yet been widely tested.
- Surfactants, specifically ones generated by organisms as secondary metabolites. They're useful because they get between the corrosive liquid and the surface and keep them apart.
- Putting a superhydrophobic coating on a surface. This keeps a biofilm from being able to develop, but is sensitive and can easily lose its superhydrophobic qualities.
- Using self-healing surfaces can prevent corrosion in cracks or faults. This could be used with a superhydrophobic surface, to mitigate its sensitivity.
- Using hydrophilic surfaces to create a region that deters the development of proteins into a film covering a surface.
- Using synthetically-created substances that deter corrosion because of their chemical structures. This may have a smaller negative effect on the environment than other options.
- Using biofilms that are grown intentionally to inhibit microbial corrosion. This is done by growing a biofilm on a surface made of a bacteria that can release compounds that kill other microbes and that prevent corrosion.
- Using essential oils. The effectiveness of essential oils against microbial corrosion has not been widely tested.
- Coating a surface with various nanomaterials or ozone to prevent microbial corrosion.

== Microbes acting to inhibit corrosion ==
Though microorganisms are often responsible for corrosion, they can also protect surfaces from corrosion. For example, oxidization is a common cause of corrosion. If a susceptible surface has a biofilm covering it that takes in and uses oxygen, then that surface will be protected from corrosion due to oxidization. Biofilms can also release antimicrobial compounds, which is helpful if the biofilm is not corrosive and can deter microbes that would be. Biofilms provide a barrier between a surface and the ecosystem surrounding it, so as long as the biofilm has no adverse effects, it can serve as protection from corrosion as well. Because biofilms don't negatively impact the ecosystem, they are potentially one of the best mechanisms for corrosion inhibition. They can also alter the conditions on the surface of a metal so that the metal is less likely to be damaged, preventing corrosion.

== See also ==
- Biogenic sulfide corrosion
- Corrosion
- Rusticle
- Bacterial Anaerobic Corrosion
