= Cement-mortar lined ductile iron pipe =

Section of DICL pipe (ductile iron concrete lined), commonly used for utility water mains, showing iron casing, concrete lining, and textured polymer protective coatings on the inner and outer surfaces.

Cement-mortar lined ductile iron pipe is a ductile iron pipe with cement lining on the inside surface, and is commonly used for water distribution.

Cement-mortar lined ductile iron pipe is governed by standards set forth by DIPRA (Ductile Iron Pipe Research Association), and was first used in 1922 in Charleston, South Carolina.

Ductile Iron is commonly used in place of cast iron pipe for fluid distribution systems. The purpose of installing a cement/mortar lining to the interior wall of the pipe is to reduce the process of tuberculation inside the pipe network. The cement/mortar lining provides an area of high pH near the pipe wall and provides a barrier between the water and the pipe, reducing its susceptibility to corrosion.
