= Monocalcium aluminate =

Names
- IUPAC name Monocalcium aluminate

Identifiers
CAS Number	12042-68-1 bad smiles
3D model (JSmol)	Interactive image
ChemSpider	140191
EC Number	234-931-0
PubChem CID	159415
CompTox Dashboard (EPA)	DTXSID8049672
- InChI: InChI=1S/2Al.Ca.4O/q;;+2;;;2*-1 Key: XFWJKVMFIVXPKK-UHFFFAOYSA-N
- SMILES: [O-][Al]=O.[O-][Al]=O.[Ca+2]

Properties
Chemical formula	CaAl_{2}O_{4}
Molar mass	158.038676 g/mol

Hazards
- GHS labelling
Pictograms	(GHS05: Corrosive) (GHS07: Exclamation mark)
Signal word	Danger
Hazard statements	H315, H318, H319, H332
Precautionary statements	P261, P264, P271, P280, P302+P352, P304+P312, P304+P340, P305+P351+P338, P310, P312, P321, P332+P313, P337+P313, P362
- Except where otherwise noted, data are given for materials in their standard state (at 25 °C [77 °F], 100 kPa). verify (what is ?) Infobox references

Monocalcium aluminate (CaAl_{2}O_{4}) is one of the series of calcium aluminates. It does occur in nature, although only very rarely, as two polymorphs known as krotite and dmitryivanovite, both from meteorites. It is important in the composition of calcium aluminate cements.

== Properties ==
Monocalcium aluminate is formed when the appropriate proportions of calcium carbonate and aluminium oxide are heated together until the mixture melts. It melts incongruently at 1390 °C. The crystal is monoclinic and pseudohexagonal, and has density 2945 kg·m^{−3}. In calcium aluminate cements, it exists as a solid solution in which the amount of minor elements depends upon the bulk composition of the cement. A typical composition is Ca_{0.93}Al_{1.94}Fe_{0.11}Si_{0.02}O_{4}. It reacts rapidly with water, forming the metastable hydrate CaO·Al_{2}O_{3}·10H_{2}O, or a mixture of 2CaO·Al_{2}O_{3}·8H_{2}O, 3CaO·Al_{2}O_{3}·6H_{2}O and Al(OH)_{3} gel. These reactions form the first stage of strength development in calcium aluminate cements.
