= Dmitryivanovite =

Oxide mineral

General
- Category: Oxide mineral
- Formula: CaAl_{2}O_{4}
- IMA symbol: Div
- Strunz classification: 4.BC.10
- Crystal system: Monoclinic
- Crystal class: Prismatic (2/m)
- Space group: P2_{1}/c
- Unit cell: a = 7.95, b = 8.62 c = 10.25 [Å]; β = 93.1°; Z = 12

Identification
- Color: Colorless
- Crystal habit: Phase in CAI of 470 (NWA470) CH3 chondrite as subhedral grains

Dmitryivanovite is a natural mineral composed of calcium, aluminium and oxygen, with the molecular formula CaAl_{2}O_{4}. It was reported in 2009 in a calcium-aluminium-rich inclusion in the carbonaceous chondrite meteorite 470 (NWA470) CH3, which landed in North Africa. The mineral name was chosen to honor Dmitriy A. Ivanov (1962–1986), a geologist, mineralogist, and petrologist who died on a field expedition.

It is the high-pressure CaAl_{2}O_{4} dimorph of krotite.

== See also ==
- Glossary of meteoritics
- Monocalcium aluminate
