= Sulfide stress cracking =

Form of hydrogen embrittlement due to hydrogen sulfide

Sulfide stress cracking (SSC) is a form of hydrogen embrittlement which is a cathodic cracking mechanism. It should not be confused with the term stress corrosion cracking which is an anodic cracking mechanism. Susceptible alloys, especially steels, react with hydrogen sulfide (H_{2}S), forming metal sulfides (MeS) and atomic hydrogen (H^{•}) as corrosion byproducts. Atomic hydrogen either combines to form H_{2} at the metal surface or diffuses into the metal matrix. Since sulfur is a hydrogen recombination poison, the amount of atomic hydrogen which recombines to form H_{2} on the surface is greatly reduced, thereby increasing the amount of diffusion of atomic hydrogen into the metal matrix. This aspect is what makes wet H_{2}S environments so severe.

Since SSC is a form of hydrogen embrittlement, it is most susceptibile to cracking at or slightly below ambient temperature.

Sulfide stress cracking has special importance in the gas and oil industry, as the materials being processed there (natural gas and crude oil) often contain considerable amounts of hydrogen sulfide. Equipment that comes in contact with H_{2}S environments can be rated for sour service with adherence to NACE MR0175/ISO 15156 for oil and gas production environments or NACE MR0103/ISO17945 for oil and gas refining environments.

"High Temperature Hydrogen Attack" (HTHA) does not rely on atomic hydrogen. At high temperature and high hydrogen partial pressure, hydrogen can diffuse into carbon steel alloys. In susceptible alloys, hydrogen combines with carbon within the alloy and forms methane. The methane molecules create a pressure buildup in the metal lattice voids, which leads to embrittlement and even cracking of the metal.

== See also ==
- Biogenic sulfide corrosion
- Corrosion engineering
- Crevice corrosion
- Pitting corrosion
- Sulfidation
