= Cast iron pipe =

Pipe made predominantly from gray cast iron

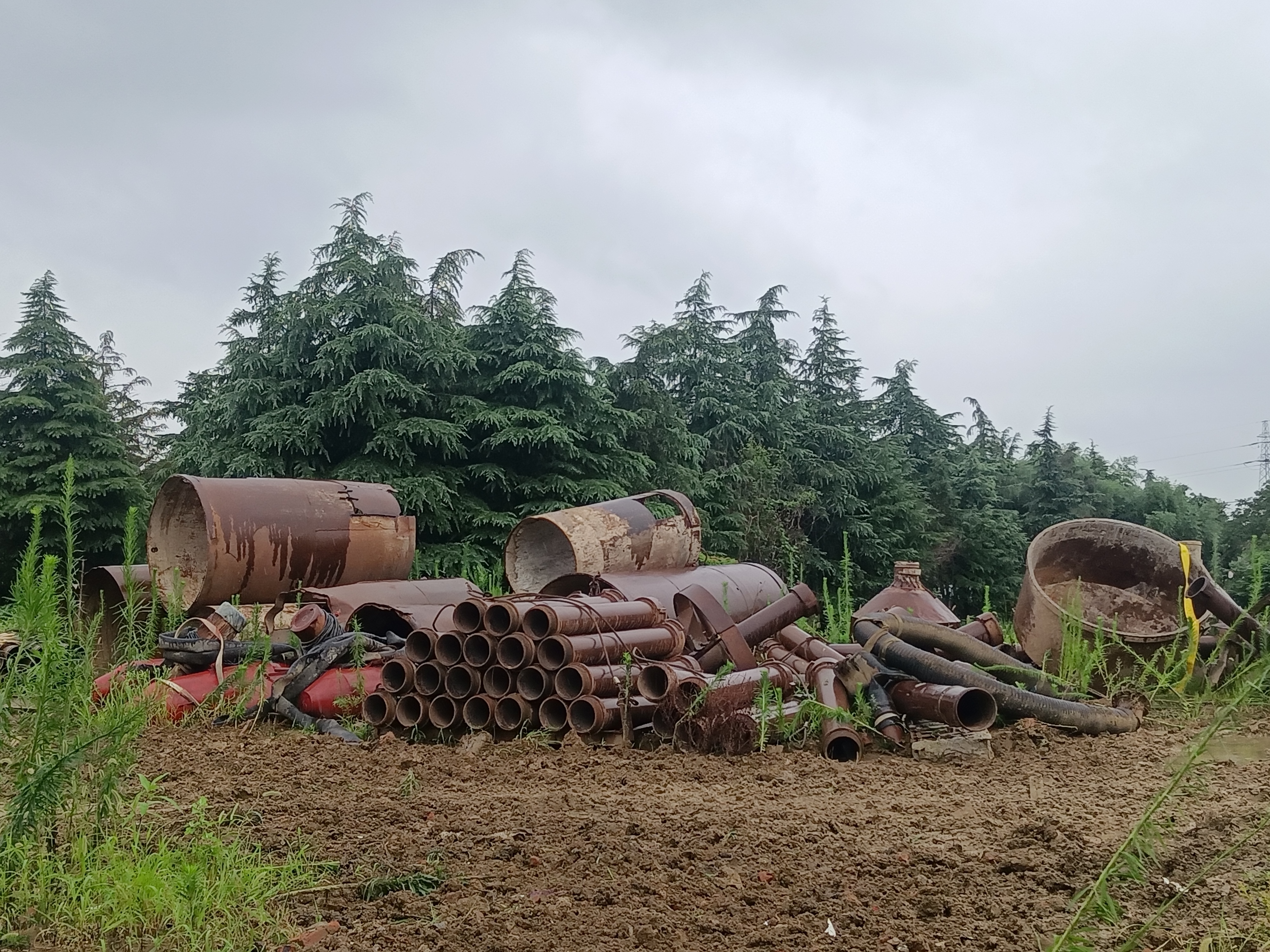
Cast iron pipes piled up near the construction site

Cast iron pipe is pipe made predominantly from gray cast iron. It was historically used as a pressure pipe for transmission of water, gas and sewage, and as a water drainage pipe during the 17th, 18th, 19th and 20th centuries.

In many modern applications, cast iron pipe has been replaced by ductile iron pipe, but this newer product is still often loosely referred to by the older historical name.

== History ==
Typical leaded bell-and-spigot joint used for cast iron pipe

The oldest cast iron water pipes date from the 17th century and were installed to distribute water throughout the gardens of the Chateau de Versailles. These amount to some 35 km of pipe, typically 1 m lengths with flanged joints. The extreme age of these pipes make them of considerable historical value. Despite extensive refurbishment in 2008 by Saint-Gobain PAM, 80% remain original.

Cast iron proved to be a beneficial material for the manufacture of water pipes and was used as a replacement for the original elm pipelines utilized earlier. These water pipelines were composed of individually cast pipe sections, often termed sticks, jointed together by a variety of joint mechanisms. Flanged joints consisted of flat machined surfaces that were tightly bolted together with a gasket between them to prevent leakage. This type of pipe joint is still in use today, typically for above-ground pipelines in water treatment and manufacturing plants.

Cast iron pipe was frequently used uncoated, although later coatings and linings reduced corrosion and improved hydraulics. In cast iron pipe, the graphite forms flakes during the casting process, when examined under a microscope. Cast iron pipe was superseded by ductile iron pipe, which is a direct development, with most existing manufacturing plants transitioning to the new material during the 1970s and 1980s. Ductile iron pipe is different from cast iron, because the introduction of magnesium during the casting process causes the graphite to form spheres (graphite nodules) rather than flakes. While this allows the material to remain castable, the end product is much tougher than cast iron, and allows elastic behavior at lower stress levels. Little cast iron pipe is currently manufactured, since ductile iron pipe is widely accepted as a superior product. Many public utilities, municipalities, and private industries still have functional cast iron pipe in service to this day.

== Joints ==
In a bell and spigot joint one end of the pipe stick is flared, termed the bell or socket, to enable the opposite end of the next stick, the spigot end, to be inserted to create a joint. The gaps in these joints were stuffed with oakum or yarn to retain molten-lead, which solidified into a waterproof joint. This was a labor-intensive operation, and the quality of the seal was dependent on the skill of the laborer.

Mechanical joints were made by bolting a movable follower ring on the spigot close to the corresponding bell, which compressed a gasket in between. Many water pipes today use mechanical joints, since they are easily made and do not require special skills to install. This type of joint also allows some deflection to occur without sacrificing joint integrity, so that minor alignment adjustments can be made during installation, and the joints retain their integrity when subjected to limited subsidence. Typical joint deflections at mechanical joints today range anywhere from 3 to 5 degrees.

Ball-and-socket joints introduced more "rounded" sockets, allowing a relatively large amount of deflection at each joint. This type of joint, still in use today, was considered a special-purpose joint, and has been used primarily in both submerged and mountainous terrain. This type of joint can typically allow around 15 degrees of deflection at each joint, making 'snaking' of the pipe possible. The advantage of this joint type was that it was quicker than bell and spigot joints, and did not require special skills or tools to install.

Push-on joints, developed in the mid 1950s, allowed a quicker and relatively non-skilled method of jointing pipe. This joint consisted of a bell with a recessed groove which held a rubberized gasket. A lubricated beveled spigot section can be pushed into this joint with care, as not to roll the rubberized gasket, and once installed became watertight. This type of jointing system is popular today with ductile iron and polyvinyl chloride (PVC) pipes.

== Manufacture ==
=== Horizontally cast ===
The first cast iron pipe was produced in horizontal moulds, the core of the mould would be supported on small iron rods which would become part of the pipe. Horizontal casting resulted in an uneven distribution of metal around the pipe circumference. Typically slag would collect at the crown of the pipe creating a much weaker section.

=== Vertically cast ===
In 1845, the first pipe was cast vertically in a pit and by the end of the century, all pipe was manufactured by this method. Using this method the slag would all collect at the top of the casting and could be removed by simply cutting off the end of the pipe. Pipes cast using this method often suffered from off centre bores caused by the core of the mould being placed off centre, resulting in one side of the pipe being thicker than the other.

=== Centrifugally cast ===
Subsequent to its invention by Dimitri Sensaud deLavaud, a French-Brazilian, in 1918, much cast iron pipe manufacturing shifted to the dramatically different technique of centrifugal casting. Modern ductile iron pipe production continues to use this general method of casting.

Historically, two different types of molds have been used in centrifugal casting of cast iron pipe: metal molds and sand molds. With metal molds, molten iron was introduced into the mold to uniformly distribute metal over the interior of the mold surface by the centrifugal force generated. The outside mold was typically protected from damage by a controlled water bath or water spray system. When the pipe was cool enough to be handled and hold its shape, the mold was stopped and the pipe removed. Pipe formed in metal molds were typically annealed after casting to eliminate any stresses in the pipe, and were then cleaned, inspected, tested, gauged (for dimensions), coated internally and/or externally, and stored for use. Standards for cast-iron pipe centrifugally cast in metal molds for water were established and published by the American Water Works Association.

When cast with sand molds, two types of manufacturing processes were used. In the first method, a metal pattern was typically positioned in a metal flask and molding sand was rammed into the annular space between the flask and pattern. The pattern was then removed for casting of the pipe using molten grey iron. The second method did not entail a metal pattern, but entailed the forming of the mold centrifugally by lining the heated flask with a measured amount of thermosetting resin and sand. Either way, the casting machine was stopped after the pipe had solidified and the flask was removed. Cast iron pipe formed using this procedure was typically oven-cooled under controlled time and temperature conditions. As with metal molds, pipe was typically annealed to eliminate any stresses in the pipe, and were then cleaned, inspected, tested, gauged (for dimensions), coated internally and/or externally, and stored for use. Standards for cast-iron pipe centrifugally cast in sand molds for water were established and published by the American Water Works Association.

== Internal corrosion ==
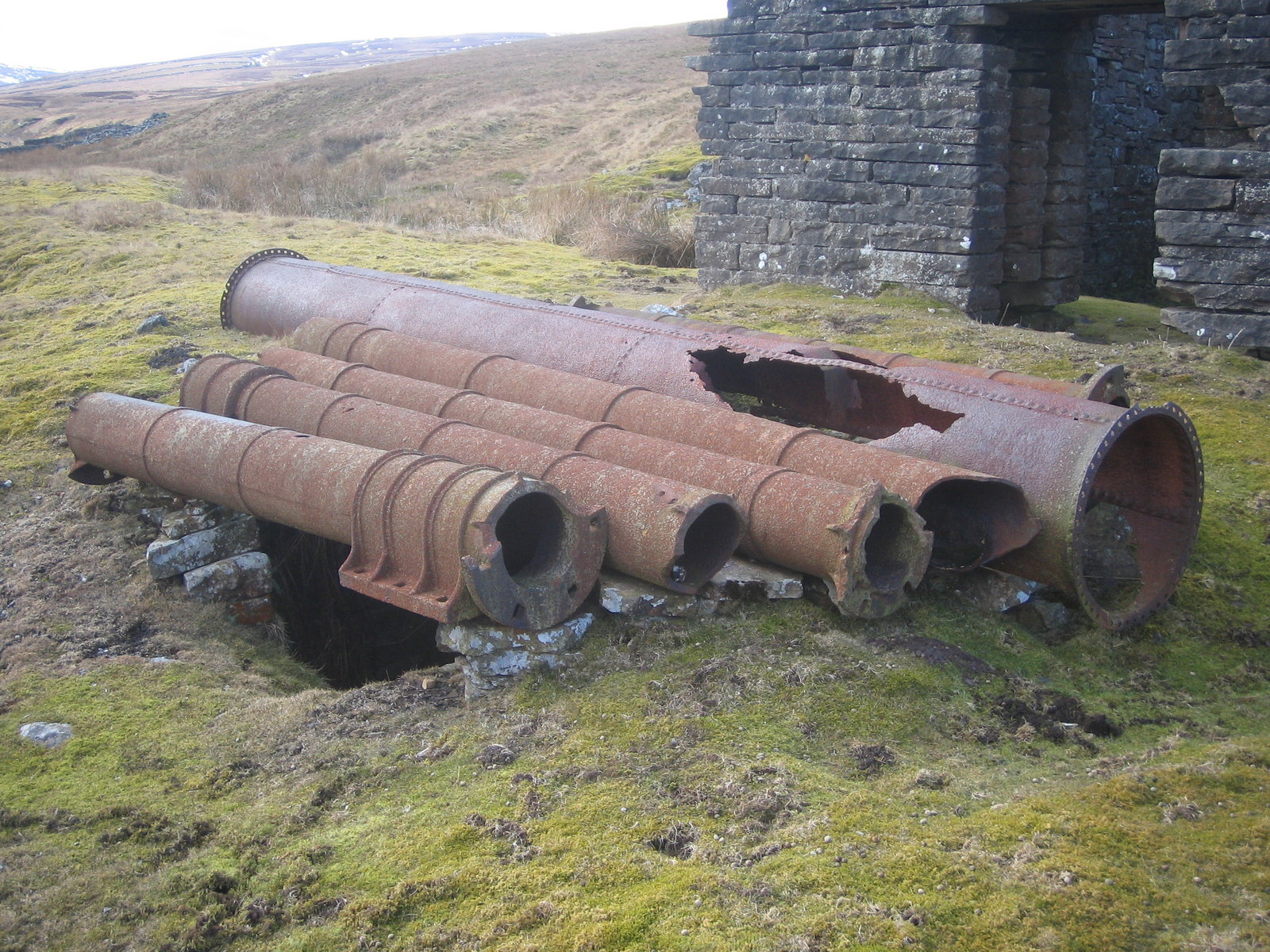
Severely corroded cast iron pipe at Lane End mine shaft

Corrosion of cast-iron-pipe can occur on both the internal and external surfaces. In electro-chemical corrosion, internal anodes develop where bare iron is exposed to aggressive waters, promoting iron to move into solution. The iron combines with various components in the water, forming a tubercle on the pipe interior. This process of tuberculation can eventually cause significant restrictions in cross-sectional area within the pipe. Since the tubercles are irregularly shaped, buildup of bacterial growths on the surface are likely. As more iron moves into solution, the result is a loss of pipe structure over time potentially affecting pipe integrity. In storm and sanitary sewer systems, the creation of acidic gases (such as hydrogen sulfide) by microbial action can further corrode internal pipe walls but is most pronounced on the inside ‘ceiling’ of the pipe.

Starting in 1922, internal cement linings were introduced to act as a barrier to minimize internal corrosion. In 1929, the American Standard Association (ASA) Sectional Committee issued a tentative standard for cement-mortar linings, which was published in 1932. In 1939, American Standard A21.4 was published, which defined a Type I cement coating on the inside of waterline pipe to be used. When the standard was updated in 1953, the Type I cement was replaced with Type II, since it was believed that Type II was a more closely controlled product. The standard was further revised in 1964, which included the use of either Type I or Type II cement, and making two different mortar thicknesses available.

== Standardization ==
The first standardization of cast iron water pipes in Britain occurred in 1917 with the publishing of BS 78. This standard specified a dimensionless nominal size, which approximately corresponded with the internal diameter in inches of the pipe, and four pressure classes, Class A, Class B, Class C and Class D, each with a specified wall thickness and outer diameter. It is noted that the outer diameter is identical between classes with the exception of sizes 12 to 27, where Classes A and B share one diameter and Classes C and D have another, larger diameter.

Nominal size	Class									
Nominal size	A & B	A		B		C & D	C		D	
Nominal size	Outer diameter [in (mm)]	Wall thickness [in (mm)]	Internal diameter [in (mm)]	Wall thickness [in (mm)]	Internal diameter [in (mm)]	Outer diameter [in (mm)]	Wall thickness [in (mm)]	Internal diameter [in (mm)]	Wall thickness [in (mm)]	Internal diameter [in (mm)]
3	3.76 (95.504)	0.38 (9.652)	3.00 (76.200)	0.38 (9.652)	3.00 (76.200)	3.76 (95.504)	0.38 (9.652)	3.00 (76.200)	0.40 (10.160)	2.96 (75.184)
4	4.80 (121.920)	0.39 (9.906)	4.02 (102.108)	0.39 (9.906)	4.02 (102.108)	4.80 (121.920)	0.40 (10.160)	4.00 (101.600)	0.46 (11.684)	3.88 (98.552)
5	5.90 (149.860)	0.41 (10.414)	5.08 (129.032)	0.41 (10.414)	5.08 (129.032)	5.90 (149.860)	0.45 (11.430)	5.00 (127.000)	0.52 (13.208)	4.86 (123.444)
6	6.98 (177.292)	0.43 (10.922)	6.12 (155.448)	0.43 (10.922)	6.12 (155.448)	6.98 (177.292)	0.49 (12.446)	6.00 (152.400)	0.57 (14.478)	5.84 (148.336)
7	8.06 (204.724)	0.45 (11.430)	7.16 (181.864)	0.45 (11.430)	7.16 (181.864)	8.06 (204.724)	0.53 (13.462)	7.00 (177.800)	0.61 (15.494)	6.84 (173.736)
8	9.14 (232.156)	0.47 (11.938)	8.20 (208.280)	0.47 (11.938)	8.20 (208.280)	9.14 (232.156)	0.57 (14.478)	8.00 (203.200)	0.65 (16.510)	7.84 (199.136)
9	10.20 (259.080)	0.48 (12.192)	9.22 (234.188)	0.49 (12.446)	9.22 (234.188)	10.20 (259.080)	0.60 (15.240)	9.00 (228.600)	0.69 (17.526)	8.82 (224.028)
10	11.26 (286.004)	0.52 (13.208)	10.22 (259.588)	0.52 (13.208)	10.22 (259.588)	11.26 (286.004)	0.63 (16.002)	10.00 (254.000)	0.73 (18.542)	9.80 (248.920)
12	13.14 (333.756)	0.55 (13.970)	12.04 (305.816)	0.57 (14.478)	12.00 (304.800)	13.60 (345.440)	0.69 (17.526)	12.22 (310.388)	0.80 (20.320)	12.00 (304.800)
14	15.22 (386.588)	0.57 (14.478)	14.08 (357.632)	0.61 (15.494)	14.00 (355.600)	15.72 (399.288)	0.75 (19.050)	14.22 (361.188)	0.86 (21.844)	14.00 (355.600)
15	16.26 (413.004)	0.59 (14.986)	15.08 (383.032)	0.63 (16.002)	15.00 (381.000)	16.78 (426.212)	0.77 (19.558)	15.24 (387.096)	0.89 (22.606)	15.00 (381.000)
16	17.30 (439.420)	0.60 (15.240)	16.10 (408.940)	0.65 (16.510)	16.00 (406.400)	17.84 (453.136)	0.80 (20.320)	16.24 (412.496)	0.92 (23.368)	16.00 (406.400)
18	19.38 (492.252)	0.63 (16.002)	18.12 (460.248)	0.69 (17.526)	18.00 (457.200)	19.96 (506.984)	0.85 (21.590)	18.26 (463.804)	0.98 (24.892)	18.00 (457.200)
20	21.46 (545.084)	0.65 (16.510)	20.16 (512.064)	0.73 (18.542)	20.00 (508.000)	22.06 (560.324)	0.89 (22.606)	20.28 (515.112)	1.03 (26.162)	20.00 (508.000)
21	22.50 (571.500)	0.67 (17.018)	21.16 (537.464)	0.75 (19.050)	21.00 (533.400)	23.12 (587.248)	0.92 (23.368)	21.28 (540.512)	1.03 (26.162)	21.00 (533.400)
24	25.60 (650.240)	0.71 (18.034)	24.18 (614.172)	0.80 (20.320)	24.00 (609.600)	26.26 (667.004)	0.98 (24.892)	24.30 (617.220)	1.13 (28.702)	24.00 (609.600)
27	28.70 (728.980)	0.75 (19.050)	27.20 (690.880)	0.85 (21.590)	27.00 (685.800)	29.40 (746.760)	1.04 (26.416)	27.32 (693.928)	1.20 (30.480)	27.00 (685.800)
30	32.52 (826.008)	0.79 (20.066)	30.94 (785.876)	0.89 (22.606)	30.74 (780.796)	32.52 (826.008)	1.09 (27.686)	30.34 (770.636)	1.26 (32.004)	30.00 (762.000)
33	35.66 (905.764)	0.83 (21.082)	34.00 (863.600)	0.94 (23.876)	33.78 (858.012)	35.66 (905.764)	1.15 (29.210)	33.36 (847.344)	1.33 (33.782)	33.00 (838.200)
36	38.76 (984.504)	0.87 (22.098)	37.02 (940.308)	0.98 (24.892)	36.80 (934.720)	38.76 (984.504)	1.20 (30.480)	36.36 (923.544)	1.38 (35.052)	36.00 (914.400)
40	42.92 (1,090.168)	0.92 (23.368)	41.08 (1,043.432)	1.03 (26.162)	40.86 (1,037.844)	42.92 (1,090.168)	1.26 (32.004)	40.40 (1,026.160)	1.46 (37.084)	40.00 (1,016.000)
42	45.00 (1,143.000)	0.95 (24.130)	43.10 (1,094.740)	1.06 (26.924)	42.88 (1,089.152)	45.00 (1,143.000)	1.30 (33.020)	42.40 (1,076.960)	1.50 (38.100)	42.00 (1,066.800)
45	48.10 (1,221.740)	0.99 (25.146)	46.12 (1,171.448)	1.09 (27.686)	45.92 (1,166.368)	48.10 (1,221.740)	1.35 (34.290)	45.40 (1,153.160)	1.55 (39.370)	45.00 (1,143.000)
48	51.20 (1,300.480)	1.03 (26.162)	49.14 (1,248.156)	1.13 (28.702)	48.94 (1,243.076)	51.20 (1,300.480)	1.38 (35.052)	48.44 (1,230.376)	1.68 (42.672)	47.84 (1,215.136)

BS 78 was finally superseded when the UK harmonized with incompatible European standards; however, the specified outer dimensions continue to remain in effect (albeit in metric form) as the standard pipe outer diameter for ductile iron pipe in Australia and New Zealand through the descendant specification, AS/NZS 2280.
