= Shulamit Gross =

Israeli geologist

- שולמית גרוס
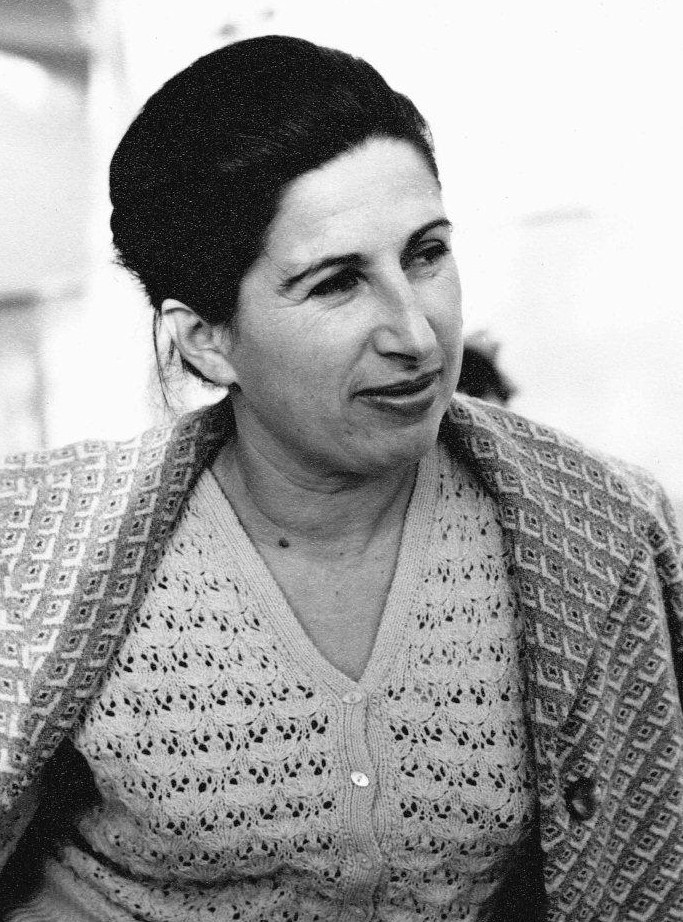
- Born: 1 October 1923; Grodno, Poland
- Died: 19 September 2012 (aged 88)
- Education: Belarusian National Technical University
- Known for: Hatrurim Formation
- Scientific career
- Workplaces: Hebrew University of Jerusalem

Shulamit Gross (Hebrew: שולמית גרוס; lived 1 October 1923 – 19 Sep 2012) was an Israeli mineralogist and geologist who studied the Hatrurim Formation.

== Biography ==
Gross was born as Shulamit Lifszyc in Grodno, Poland (today, Hrodna, Belarus). She was the daughter of Fryda and Mejer Lifszyc. She studied in the local Tarbut school, and later on at the Belarusian State Polytechnic Institute in Minsk. When Nazi Germany invaded the Soviet Union during the summer of 1941, she fled to Tashkent in Uzbekistan. Here she continued her studies in the faculty of geology, which she graduated cum laude in 1945. Her parents were murdered in the Treblinka extermination camp in 1943. She began a PhD in the Radioactive Micas of Central Asia, but was not permitted KGB security clearance, and her studies were terminated. After graduating, she moved to Lomonosov University in Moscow to conduct research in crystallography. Her second project considered "The ionic radius effect on lattice structure and mineral properties". In 1950 she immigrated to Israel (Aliyah) with her husband, the film director Natan Gross, and their baby, Yaakov, who later became a film director (Yaakov Gross) in his adult life as well.

== Research ==
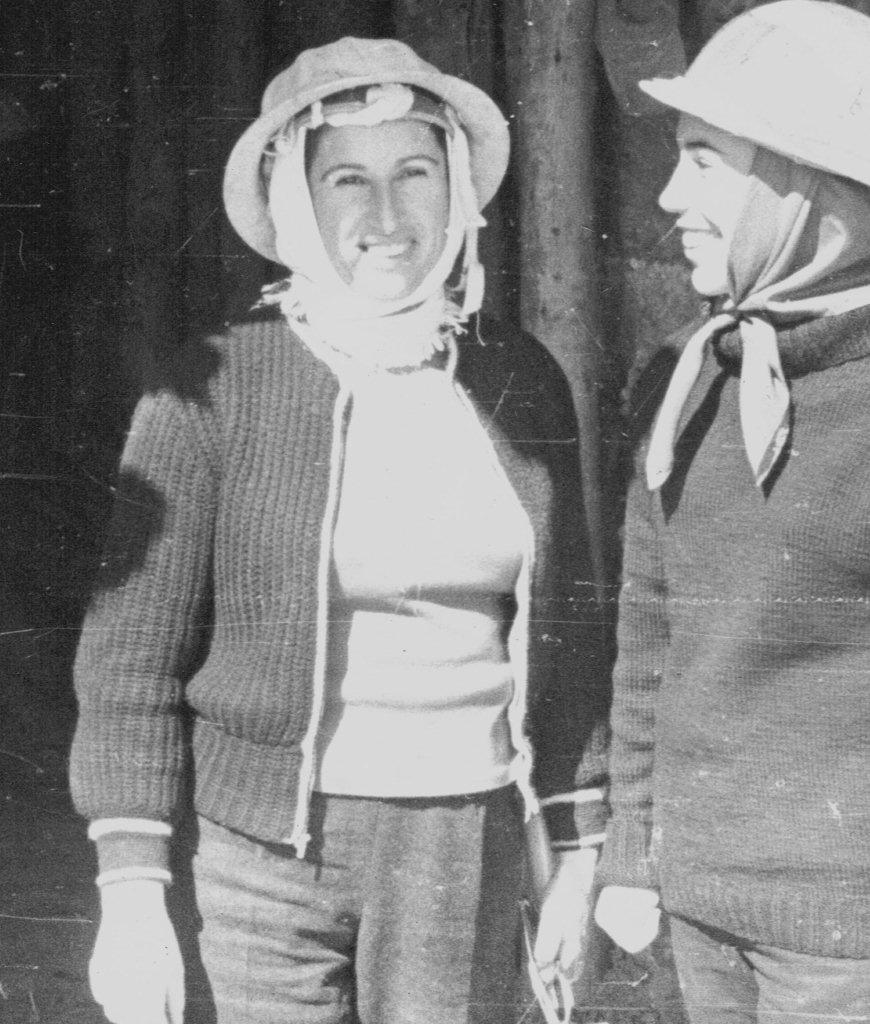
Shulamit Gross at work

Gross was known for her research on the mineralogy of the Hatrurim Formation. In 1958, she began working at the Israel Atomic Energy Commission. During the 1960s, a group of scientists from the Hebrew University of Jerusalem, including Yaakov Ben-Tor, and Lisa Heller-Kallai, discovered that the Hatrurim Formation contained several rare, if not unique, mineral assemblages. She moved to the Israeli Geological Society in 1961. She became a PhD candidate at the Hebrew University of Jerusalem in 1964, working on "The Mineralogy of the Hatrurim Formation, Israel".

Mineralogical analyses revealed that the rocks contain common minerals such as diopside, wollastonite, garnet, anorthite, as well as rare minerals such as spurrite, brownmillerite, gehlenite, tacharanite, and larnite. These rare minerals only form at high temperature, for example in places where siliceous limestones are contact-metamorphosed by volcanic rocks (commonly basalt). Some of these well crystallized anhydrous minerals, preserved by the local desertic conditions of this very arid area, serve as end-member reference for the mineral phases formed in the clinker of man-made Portland cement, and are still studied as natural analogues. The manufacturing of Portland cement involves a similar process: heating of limestone or chalk with siliceous clay at high temperature (1450 °C).

She continued to study these rare minerals and in 1977 published a monograph describing 123 mineral species discovered in the Hatrurim Formation. Five were previously known only from a single locality, and eight others were known only as artificial products of the cement industry. Gross also discovered several minerals completely new to science: bentorite, ye'elimite, and hatrurite. A fourth mineral discovered by Gross was only described later by Dietmar Weber and Adolf Bischoff, which they named grossite after Shulamit.

She demonstrated that the unique mineral assemblages of the Hatrurim Formation were formed by pyrometamorphism, and she managed to recreate in the laboratory most of the minerals by heating the precursor sedimentary rocks of the Ghareb and Taqiye formations.

Her discoveries earned her the inaugural Rafael Freund Award of the Israeli Geological Society in 1979. She became an honorary member of the Israel Geological Society in 1986.

In 2011, a new perovskite-related mineral from the Hatrurim Basin was named shulamitite to honor Shulamit Gross for her works. Shulamitite, ideally Ca_{3}TiFe^{(III)}AlO_{8}, is a mineral intermediate between perovskite (CaTiO_{3}) and brownmillerite (Ca_{2}(Fe,Al)_{2}O_{5}), a mineral of the cement clinker. She died on September 18, 2012.
