= Chlormayenite =

Mayenite supergroup, mayenite mineral

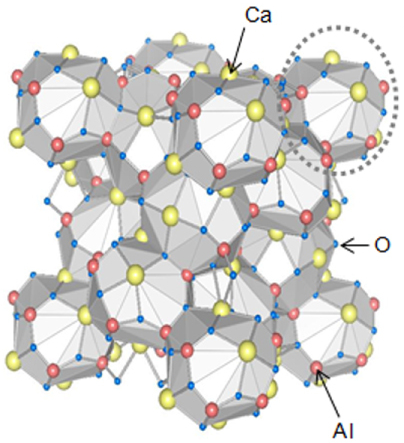
- Crystal structure of chlormayenite (Cl^{−} ions are omitted for clarity)

General
- Category: Oxide mineral Mayenite supergroup
- Formula: Ca_{12}Al_{14}O_{32}[☐_{4}Cl_{2}]
- IMA symbol: Cmy
- Strunz classification: 4.CC.20
- Crystal system: Cubic
- Crystal class: Hextetrahedral (4̅3m); H-M symbol: (4̅ 3m)
- Space group: I4̅3d
- Unit cell: a = 11.98 Å; Z = 2

Identification
- Color: Colorless
- Crystal habit: Microscopic anhedral grains
- Streak: White
- Diaphaneity: Transparent
- Specific gravity: 2.85
- Optical properties: Isotropic
- Refractive index: 1.614–1.643
- Alters to: Absorbs water on exposure

Chlormayenite (after Mayen, Germany), Ca_{12}Al_{14}O_{32}[☐_{4}Cl_{2}], is a rare calcium aluminium oxide mineral of cubic symmetry.

It was originally reported from Eifel volcanic complex (Germany) in 1964. It is also found at pyrometamorphic sites such as in the Hatrurim Formation of Israel and in some burned coal dumps.

It occurs in thermally altered limestone xenoliths within basalts in Mayen, Germany and Klöch, Styria, Austria. In the Hatrurim of Israel it occurs in thermally altered limestones. It occurs with calcite, ettringite, wollastonite, larnite, brownmillerite, gehlenite, diopside, pyrrhotite, grossular, spinel, afwillite, jennite, portlandite, jasmundite, melilite, kalsilite and corundum in the limestone xenoliths. In the Hatrurim it occurs with spurrite, larnite, grossite and brownmillerite.

Synthetic Ca_{12}Al_{14}O_{33} and Ca_{12}Al_{14}O_{32}(OH)_{2} are known, they are stabilized by moisture instead of chlorine. The formula can be written as [Ca_{12}Al_{14}O_{32}]O, which refers to the unique feature: anion diffusion process.

Chlormayenite is also found as calcium aluminate in cement where its formula is also written as 11CaO·7 Al_{2}O_{3}·CaCl_{2}, or C_{11}A_{7}CaCl_{2} in the cement chemist notation.

== See also ==
- Calcium aluminate cements
