= Bentorite =

Rare chromium-rich ettringite, or Cr-AFt

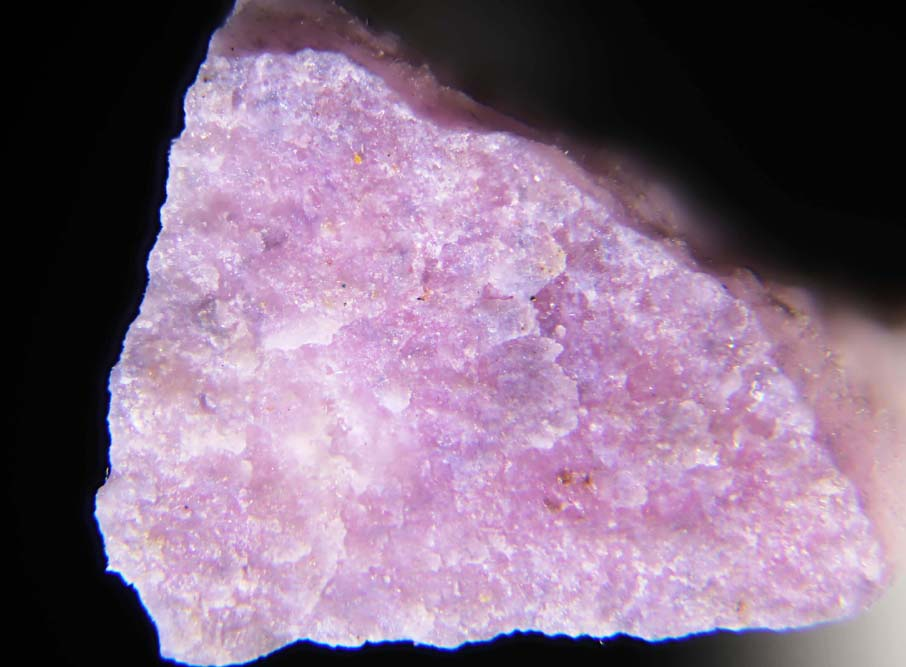
- Bentorite found in Israel

General
- Category: Minerals
- Formula: Ca_{6}(Cr,Al)_{2}(SO_{4})_{3}(OH)_{12}· 26H_{2}O
- IMA symbol: Bto
- Strunz classification: 7.DG.15 (9th Ed)
- Dana classification: 31.10.2.2
- Unit cell: 2,355.60 Å³

Identification
- Colour: Violet to rose-purple
- Twinning: (1010)
- Cleavage: Perfect
- Fracture: Sub-conchoidal
- Mohs scale hardness: 2
- Luster: Resinous, waxy, earthy
- Streak: Very pale purple
- Specific gravity: 2.025
- Density: 2.025 g/cm^{3} (measured)
- Birefringence: 0.006
- Pleochroism: Visible
- Extinction: Parallel
- Ultraviolet fluorescence: Not fluorescent
- Absorption spectra: E > O

Bentorite is a mineral with the chemical formula Ca_{6}(Cr,Al)_{2}(SO_{4})_{3}(OH)_{12}·26H_{2}O. It is colored violet to light violet. Its crystals are hexagonal to dihexagonal dipyramidal. It is transparent and has vitreous luster. It has perfect cleavage. Bentorite is rated 2 on the Mohs scale.

The mineral was first described in 1980 by Shulamit Gross for an occurrence in the Hatrurim Formation of Danian age along the western margin of the Dead Sea, Israel. It was named by its discoverer, Shulamit Gross, for Yaakov Ben-Tor (1910–2002), Professor at the Hebrew University of Jerusalem and the University of California, San Diego, California, US, for his contributions to geology and mineralogy in Israel.

== Formation ==
The only naturally occurring bentorite that has been discovered is in the Hatrurim Formation near the Dead Sea in Israel. The formation consists of a mixture of metamorphosed clays, limestones, and marls. The original sediments were enriched in chromium, and later experienced heating to >1000 °C at atmospheric pressure. This formed a natural Portland cement which has since been hydrated from groundwater and/or rainwater to form a natural concrete. The source of the heat is thought to be due to combustion of coal, oil, or gas. Following this combustion metamorphosis, highly alkaline fluids penetrated and altered the rock to form supergene veins of bentorite.

== Applications ==
When suitably prepared, concrete contains crystals of ettringite that can exchange aluminium for chromium, converting the ettringite to bentorite. This allows concretes to sequester chromium present as an environmental pollutant.

== See also ==
- Brownmillerite
- Gehlenite
- Larnite
- Spurrite
- Ye'elimite
