= Nabimusaite =

Nesosilicate sulfate mineral

General
- Category: Silicate mineral, nesosilicate
- Formula: KCa_{12}(SiO_{4})_{4}(SO_{4})_{2}O_{2}F
- IMA symbol: Nbm
- Crystal system: Trigonal
- Crystal class: Hexagonal scalenohedral (3̅m); H-M symbol: (3̅ 2m)
- Space group: R3̅m
- Unit cell: a = 7.19, b = 7.19 c = 41.25 [Å] (approximated); Z = 3

Identification
- Color: Colorless
- Cleavage: (001), imperfect
- Tenacity: Brittle
- Mohs scale hardness: 5
- Luster: Vitreous
- Streak: White
- Density: 3.12 (calculated) (approximated)
- Optical properties: Uniaxial (-)
- Refractive index: nω=1.64, nε=1.64 (approximated)

Nabimusaite is a very rare mineral with formula KCa_{12}(SiO_{4})_{4}(SO_{4})_{2}O_{2}F. Its structure, as in case of similar aradite and zadovite, is a derivative of the one of hatrurite. Nabimusaite gives its name to the nabimusaite group. The mineral was found in a pyrometamorphic rock of the Hatrurim Formation, a site known for the natural pyrometamorphism. It is interpreted to have formed due to interaction of a precursor assemblage with sulfate-rich melt. Nabimusaite is potassium- and fluorine-analogue of dargaite.

== Associations ==
Nabimusaite was discovered in nodules composed of larnite and ye'elimite, in a rock formed due to pyrometamorphism.

== Notes on chemistry ==
Nabimusaite is impure as it has a phosphorus admixture.

== Crystal structure ==
Crystal structure of nabimusaite is modular. It is of antiperovskite type. It is composed of hatrurite-like modules [Ca_{12}(SiO_{4})_{4}O_{2}F]^{3+} anions in octahedral and cations in tetrahedral coordination with [K(SO_{4})_{2}]_{3} modules. The two modules are mutually intercalated.

== Origin ==
Nabimusaite is suggested to result from interaction of a melt, rich in potassium and sulfate, with earlier minerals (ellestadite and larnite).
