= Grossite =

Oxide mineral

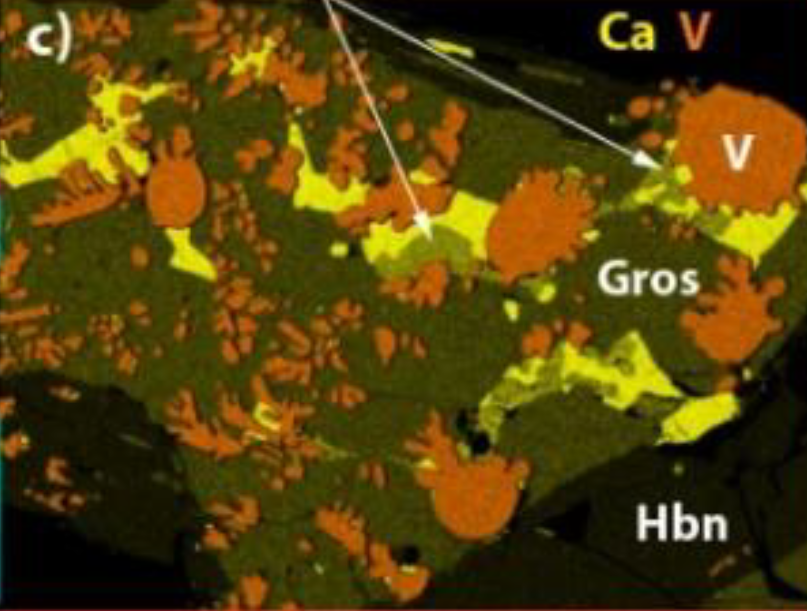

General
- Category: Oxide minerals
- Formula: CaAl_{4}O_{7}
- IMA symbol: Gss
- Strunz classification: 4.CC.15
- Dana classification: 07.03.02.01
- Crystal system: Monoclinic
- Crystal class: Prismatic (2/m) (same H-M symbol)
- Space group: C2/c
- Unit cell: a = 12.94, b = 8.91 c = 5.44 [Å]; β = 107.01°; Z = 4

Identification
- Color: Colorless to white
- Crystal habit: Lathlike or subhedral rounded grains in polycrystalline aggregates rimmed by melilite (in meteorites)
- Luster: Vitreous
- Streak: White
- Diaphaneity: Transparent
- Specific gravity: 2.88
- Optical properties: Biaxial (+)
- Refractive index: nα = 1.618 nβ = 1.618 nγ = 1.652
- Birefringence: δ = 0.034
- 2V angle: Measured: 15°

Grossite is a calcium aluminium oxide mineral with formula CaAl_{4}O_{7}. It is a colorless to white vitreous mineral which crystallizes in the monoclinic crystal system.

The unnamed calcium aluminium oxide mineral phase was first described from a refractory inclusion in a meteorite sample by Mireille Christophe Michel-Lévy and colleagues in 1982.

A terrestrial occurrence of grossite was first described in 1994 from the Hatrurim Formation of Israel. It was named for Shulamit Gross (1923–2012) of the Geological Survey of Israel.

It occurs within high temperature metamorphosed impure limestone of the Hatrurim Formation and also within calcium-aluminium rich inclusions in chondritic meteorites. Associated minerals in the Hatrurium include brownmillerite, mayenite and larnite. In meteorites it occurs with perovskite, melilite, hibonite, spinel and calcium rich pyroxene.

== See also ==
- Glossary of meteoritics
