= Silicate carbonate =

Class of chemical compounds

The silicate carbonates are double salts that contain both silicate and carbonate in their formula. Most compounds are natural minerals containing calcium or rare earth elements. However, some have been made experimentally. Silicate carbonate minerals can be formed in limestone metamorphosed by heating from igneous intrusions. Scawtite forms where the activity of calcium is high compared to H^{+}. Spurrite forms in a limited range of calcium activity and high silica activity. In magma, a carbonate rich melt is immiscible with a silicate melt.

== Structures ==
Silicate carbonates contain carbonate triangles, and silicate tetrahedrons, SiO_{4}. Tillyite contains disilicate Si_{2}O_{7} units.

== List ==
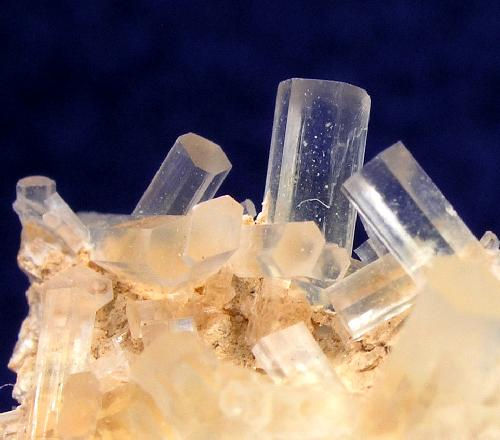
Thaumasite prisms

formula	name	structure	density	comment	ref
Ca_{4}Si_{2}O_{6}(OH)_{2}(CO_{3})	fukalite				
Ca_{5}(SiO_{4})_{2}(CO_{3})	spurrite				
Ca_{5}(Si_{2}O_{7})(CO_{3})_{2}	tilleyite	monoclinic =7.582 Å, b=10.265 Å, c =15.030 Å β=103.99°			
Ca_{5}(Si_{2}O_{7})(CO_{3})_{2}	post-Tilleyite				
Ca_{6}(CO_{3})_{1.58}(Si_{2}O_{7})_{0.21}(OH)_{7}Cl_{0.5}(OH)_{0.08} (H_{2}O)_{0.42}	deferenite				
Ca_{7}(SiO_{4})_{3}(CO_{3})	galuskinite				
Ca_{7}(Si_{6}O_{18})(CO_{3})·2H_{2}O	scawtite				
Ca_{3}Si(OH)_{6}(CO_{3})(SO_{4})•12H_{2}O	thaumasite	Hexagonal a = 11.03, c = 10.4			
Na_{7}Ca[Al_{6}Si_{6}O_{24}](CO_{3})1.5•2H_{2}O	cancrinite	hexagonal a = 12.67 c = 5.15			
(Ca_{4}Al_{6}Si_{6}O_{24}CO_{3})	meionite	tetragonal I4/m a = 12.179, c = 7.571, Z = 2			
(Ca,Na)_{4}Al_{6}Si_{6}O_{24}(SO_{4},CO_{3})	silvialite				
	scapolite				
K_{2}Ca[Si_{2}O_{5}](CO_{3})		P6_{3}22 a = 5.0479 c = 17.8668		artificial	
KNa_{4}Ca_{4}[Si_{8}O_{18}](CO_{3})_{4}F·H_{2}O	carletonite				
Y_{2}(SiO_{4})(CO_{3})	iimoriite-(Y)	triclinic P1_ a=6.549 b=6.629 c=6.4395 α=116.36° β=92.56° γ=195.507°			
Ca_{2}Y_{2}[SiO_{3}]_{4}(CO_{3})·H_{2}O	kainosite				
Ca_{4}Y_{4}[Si_{2}O_{5}]_{4}(CO_{3})_{6}·7H_{2}O	caysichite				
K_{5}Na_{5}Y_{12}[Si_{2}O_{5}]_{14}(CO_{3})_{8}(OH)_{2}·8H_{2}O	ashcroftine				
Na_{2}Ba_{2}FeTi[Si_{2}O_{7}](CO_{3}) (OH)_{3}F	bussenite				
Ba_{6}Fe_{3}[Si_{8}O_{23}](CO_{3})_{2}Cl_{3}·H_{2}O	fencooperite				
La_{2}Mn(CO_{3})(Si_{2}O_{7})	alexkuznetsovite-(La)	P2_{1}/c Z = 4 a = 6.5642 b = 6.7689 c = 18.721 Å, β = 108.684° V = 788.00 Å^{3}			
La_{2}Fe^{2+}(CO_{3})(Si_{2}O_{7})	biraite-(La)	P2_{1}/c Z = 4 a = 6.566 b = 6.767 c = 18.698 Å, β = 108.95° V = 785.7 Å^{3}			
Ce_{2}Mn(CO_{3})(Si_{2}O_{7})	alexkuznetsovite-(Ce)	P2_{1}/c Z = 4 a = 6.5764 b = 6.7685 c = 18.749 Å, β = 108.672° V =790.7 Å^{3}			
Ce_{2}Fe^{2+}[Si_{2}O_{7}](CO_{3})	biraite	monoclinic P2_{1}/c, a 6.505 b 6.744 c 18.561 β=108.75°			
Na_{2}Ce_{2}TiO_{2}[SiO_{4}](CO_{3})_{2}	tundrite				
(Y_{1.44}Er_{0.56})[SiO_{4}](CO_{3})	iimorite				
Pb_{19.4}Na_{1.9}[Si_{10}O_{25}](CO_{3})_{9}(OH)_{12.7}				artificial	
Cu_{4}Pb_{4}[SiO_{3}](HCO_{3})_{4})OH)_{4}Cl	ashburtonite				
