= Brownmillerite =

Rare calcium aluminium oxide mineral

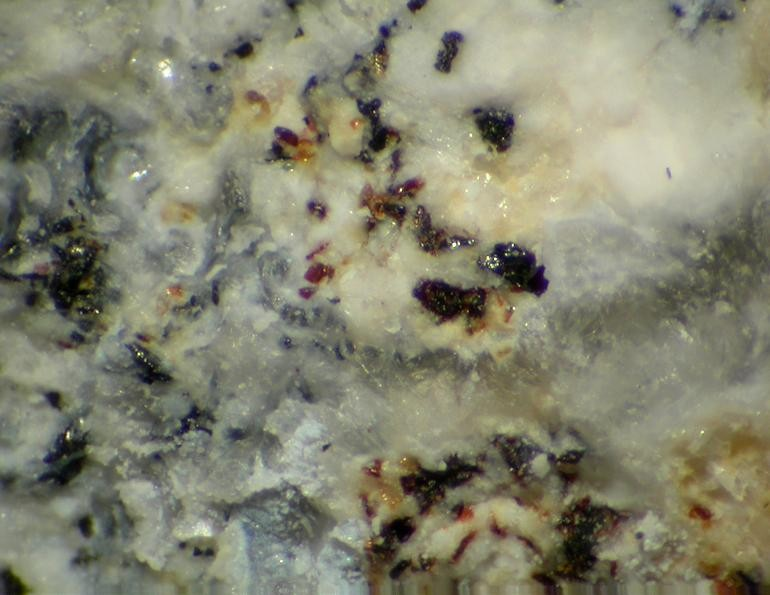
- Red/red-brown crystals of brownmillerite from Caspar quarry, Bellerberg Volcano, Ettringen, Mayen, Eifel Mts, Rhineland-Palatinate, Germany

General
- Category: Oxide mineral
- Formula: Ca_{2}(Al,Fe)_{2}O_{5}
- IMA symbol: Bmlr
- Strunz classification: 4.AC.10
- Dana classification: 7.11.2.1
- Crystal system: Orthorhombic
- Crystal class: Dipyramidal (mmm); H-M symbol: (2/m 2/m 2/m)
- Space group: Ibm2
- Unit cell: a = 5.57 Å, b = 14.52 Å, c = 5.34 Å; Z = 4

Identification
- Color: Reddish brown
- Crystal habit: As minute square platelets; massive
- Diaphaneity: Semitransparent
- Specific gravity: 3.76
- Optical properties: Biaxial (−)
- Refractive index: n_{α} = 1.960 n_{β} = 2.010 n_{γ} = 2.040
- Birefringence: δ = 0.080
- Pleochroism: Distinct; X = Y = yellow-brown; Z = dark brown
- 2V angle: 75° (measured)

Brownmillerite is a rare oxide mineral with chemical formula Ca_{2}(Al,Fe)_{2}O_{5}. It is named for Lorrin Thomas Brownmiller (1902–1990), chief chemist of the Alpha Portland Cement Company, Easton, Pennsylvania.

== Discovery and occurrence ==
The chemical compound was first recognized in 1932 and named for the chemist who identified it. The naturally occurring mineral form of the compound was first recognized in 1964 for occurrences in the Bellerberg volcano, Ettringen, Mayen-Koblenz, Germany.

At the type locality the mineral occurs within limestone blocks that are contained in a volcanic flow. The limestone blocks had undergone thermal metamorphism. The mineral also occurs in the thermally altered strata of the Hatrurim Formation of Israel. Minerals associated with brownmillerite in the Mayen locality include calcite, ettringite, wollastonite, larnite, mayenite, gehlenite, diopside, pyrrhotite, grossular, spinel, afwillite, jennite, portlandite and jasmundite. In an Austrian occurrence near Kloch, melilite, mayenite, wollastonite, kalsilite and corundum are found. Within the Hatrurim area spurrite, larnite and mayenite are associated.

The mineral is similar to the calcium aluminoferrite phases which are commonly found as components of Portland cement.

== Use as a catalyst ==
Brownmillerite has been found to be a highly active oxygen evolution reaction catalyst in neutral pH.

== See also ==
- Ye'elimite, C_{4}A_{3}S̅, a rare natural anhydrous calcium sulfoaluminate
