= Scawtite =

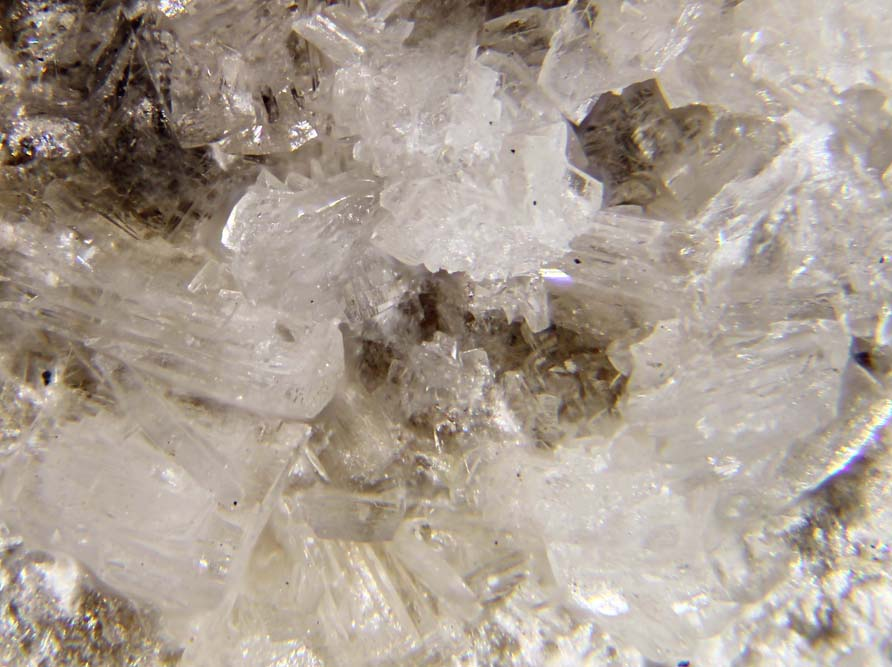

General
- Category: Silicate mineral
- Formula: Ca_{7}(Si_{3}O_{9})_{2}CO_{3}·2H_{2}O
- IMA symbol: Scw
- Strunz classification: 9.CK.15
- Dana classification: 64.2.1.1
- Crystal system: Monoclinic
- Crystal class: Prismatic (2/m) (same H-M symbol)
- Space group: C2/m
- Unit cell: a = 10.12 Å, b = 15.18 Å c = 6.62 Å; β = 100.55°; Z = 2

Identification
- Color: Colorless
- Crystal habit: Platy - micaceous, parallel to radiating clusters
- Cleavage: Perfect on {001}, poor on {010}
- Mohs scale hardness: 4–5
- Luster: Vitreous
- Diaphaneity: Transparent
- Specific gravity: 2.77
- Optical properties: Biaxial (+)
- Refractive index: n_{α} = 1.597 - 1.603 n_{β} = 1.606 - 1.609 n_{γ} = 1.618 - 1.621
- Birefringence: δ = 0.021
- 2V angle: Measured from 74° to 78°

Scawtite is a hydrous calcium silicate mineral with carbonate, formula: Ca_{7}(Si_{3}O_{9})_{2}CO_{3}·2H_{2}O. It crystallizes in the monoclinic crystal system as thin plates or flat prisms.

Scawtite was first described in 1929 for an occurrence at Scawt Hill in Northern Ireland.

Scawtite occurs as in skarns and hydrothermal veins in limestone. Associated minerals include melilite, spurrite, tobermorite, thomsonite, larnite, grossular, bultfonteinite, calcite, analcime, foshagite and hillebrandite.
