= Aradite =

Silicate-vanadate mineral

General
- Category: Minerals
- Formula: BaCa_{6}[(SiO_{4})(VO_{4})](VO_{4})_{2}
- IMA symbol: Ara

Aradite is a very rare mineral with formula BaCa_{6}[(SiO_{4})(VO_{4})](VO_{4})_{2}F. Aradite and its phosphorus-analogue, zadovite, were found in paralavas (rocks formed due to pyrometamorphism) of the Hatrurim Formation. Both aradite and zadovite have structures similar to that of nabimusaite. Structure of all three minerals is related to that of hatrurite.
