= Dorrite =

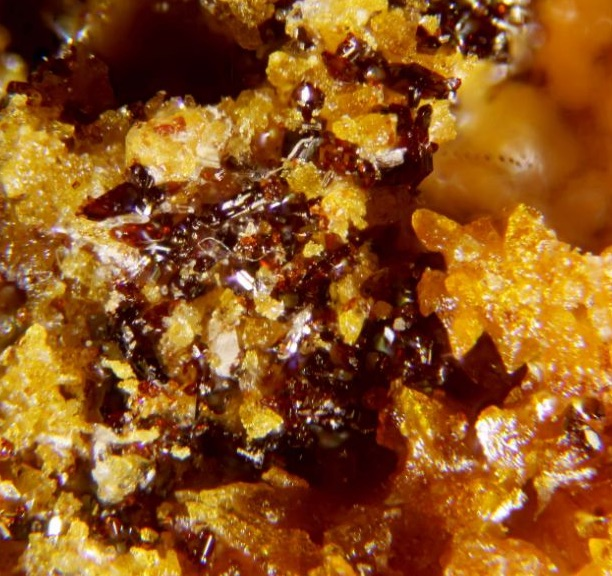
- Reddish-brown dorrite crystals from Chelyabinsk, Russia

General
- Category: Inosilicate; Sapphirine supergroup
- Formula: Ca_{2}Mg_{2}Fe_{4}^{3+}(Al_{4}Si_{2})O_{22}
- IMA symbol: Dor
- Strunz classification: 9.DH.40
- Dana classification: 69.2.1a.2
- Crystal system: Triclinic; Unknown space group
- Unit cell: a = 9.98, b = 5.08 c = 5.24 [Å]; β = 99.9°

Identification
- Formula mass: 893.97 g/mol
- Color: Dark red-brown to dark brown
- Crystal habit: Anhedral; Small prismatic crystals; Pseudomonoclinic
- Twinning: Common, producing a pseudomonoclinic symmetry
- Cleavage: Good cleavage assumed to be parallel to {010} and {001}
- Fracture: Irregular
- Mohs scale hardness: 5
- Luster: Submetallic
- Streak: Grey
- Diaphaneity: Subopaque
- Density: 3.959 g/cm^{3}
- Refractive index: α=1.82 β=1.84 γ=1.86
- Birefringence: δ = 0.040
- Pleochroism: X=red-orange to brown Y=yellowish brown Z=greenish brown
- 2V angle: 90°
- Absorption spectra: Very strong

Dorrite is a silicate mineral that is isostructural to the aenigmatite group. It is most chemically similar to the mineral rhönite [Ca_{2}Mg_{5}Ti(Al_{2}Si_{4})O_{20}], made distinct by a lack of titanium (Ti) and the presence of Fe^{3+}. Dorrite is named for Dr. John (Jack) A. Dorr, a late professor at the University of Michigan that researched in outcrops where dorrite was found in 1982. This mineral is sub-metallic resembling colors of brownish-black, dark brown, to reddish brown.

== Discovery ==
Dorrite was first reported in 1982 by A. Havette in a basalt-limestone contact on Réunion Island off of the coast of Africa. The second report of dorrite was made by Franklin Foit and his associates while examining a paralava from the Powder River Basin, Wyoming in 1987. Analyses determined that this newly found mineral was surprisingly similar to the mineral rhönite, lacking Ti but presenting dominant Fe^{3+} in its octahedral sites. Other minerals that coexist with this phase are plagioclase, gehlenite-akermanite, magnetite-magnesioferrite-spinel solid solutions, esseneite, nepheline, wollastonite, Ba-rich feldspar, apatite, ulvöspinel, ferroan sahamalite, and secondary barite, and calcite.

== Occurrence ==
Dorrite can be found in mineral reactions that relate dorrite + magnetite + clinopyroxene, rhönite + magnetite + olivine + clinopyroxene, and aenigmatite + pyroxene + olivine assemblages in nature. These assemblages favor low pressures and high temperatures. Dorrite is stable in strongly oxidizing, high-temperature, low-pressure environments. It occurs in paralava, pyrometamorphic melt rock, formed from the burning of coal beds.

== Crystallography ==
Researchers conclusively determined that dorrite is triclinic-pseudomonoclinic and twinned by a twofold rotation about the pseudomonoclinic b axis. The parameters for dorrite are a=10.505, b=10.897, c=9.019 Å, α=106.26°, β=95.16°, γ=124.75°.

=== Chemical Composition ===
Calcium 8.97%
Magnesium 5.44%
Aluminum 6.04%
Iron 37.48%
Silicon 6.28%
Oxygen 35.79%

==== Oxides ====
CaO 12.55%
MgO 9.02%
Al_{2}O_{3} 11.41%
Fe_{2}O_{3} 53.59%
SiO_{2} 13.44%
