= Yaakov Ben-Tor =

Israeli geologist (1910–2002)

- יַעֲקֹב בֵּן-תּוֹר
- Born: Kurt Winter; 1910; Königsberg, East Prussia, Germany (now Kaliningrad, Russia)
- Died: 2002 (aged 91–92); Israel
- Occupation: Geologist
- Awards: Israel Prize (1955)
- Scientific career
- Education: Sorbonne, University of Königsberg
- Known for: Geological mapping of the Negev
- Fields: Geology
- Workplaces: Hebrew University of Jerusalem

Yaakov Ben-Tor (Hebrew: יַעֲקֹב בֵּן-תּוֹר; 1910–2002) was an Israeli geologist.

== Biography ==
Ben-Tor was born as Kurt Winter in the Baltic city of Königsberg, East Prussia, Germany, (since 1945 Kaliningrad, now in Russia) in 1910.

Winter began studying law at the University of Königsberg, continuing in Berlin and then studied Linguistics at the University of the Sorbonne in Paris, prior to leaving Europe. With the rise of the Nazi Party in Germany, he emigrated to the then British Mandate of Palestine (now Israel) in 1933, where he later hebraicized his name.

Ben-Tor joined the Geology Department at the Hebrew University of Jerusalem, and continued on to doctoral studies in Switzerland, where he was erroneously arrested at the outbreak of the Second World War on suspicion of being a German spy, but he managed to flee home to Mandate Palestine. Not long after, he completed his thesis in Geology at the Hebrew University, becoming the first person to be awarded a doctoral degree by the University.

Ben-Tor served from 1944-1948 in the state-to-be's Provisional Council, as a member of the Aliyah Hadashah Party, comprising immigrants from Germany. He was also active in the Haganah (the underground Jewish defence force) and was asked to serve in Hemed, its Scientific Division, by Professor Yisrael Dostrovski. At the height of the 1947–1949 Palestine war, together with Leo Picard and Akiva Vroman, he conducted geological mapping surveys of the Negev, for the purpose of locating potential deposits of oil and uranium: however, they found only phosphate deposits Oron, near Dimona, and copper at Timna. For this work, he and Vroman were later awarded the Israel Prize.

During this period, Ben-Tor also completed a second doctorate with distinction, this time at the Sorbonne. In 1953, he served as the head of the Israel Geological Society and in 1954 he was appointed head of the Israel Geological Survey. He later became Head of the Geology Department at the Hebrew University of Jerusalem and later was also a professor at the University of California, San Diego, in the United States of America.

The mineral Bentorite, discovered in the Hatrurim Formation of the Dead Sea in 1980 by Shulamit Gross, was named in his honour.

The dinoflagellate cyst Spiniferites bentorii was also named in his honour.

== Awards ==
- In 1955, Ben-Tor was awarded the Israel Prize, for his contribution to Life Sciences.

== See also ==
- List of Israel Prize recipients
- Amnon Ben-Tor
