= John K. Hall =

John K. Hall (born 1940) is an American-born marine geophysicist, known for his work in marine geology, bathymetric mapping, and Arctic research.

He is known for development of digital terrain models (DTMs) and bathymetric surveys for various regions of the world. He has also led work in bathymetric charting of the Mediterranean, Black Sea, and Arctic regions, as well as in the National Bathymetric Survey of Israel. In 2020, he was awarded the Medallion of the Israel Geological Society.

== Early life ==
Hall was born April 14, 1940 in Waltham, Massachusetts. He earned a Bachelor of Science degree in Geology from Rensselaer Polytechnic Institute (RPI) in Troy, New York, in 1962. He then completed his Ph.D. in Marine Geophysics at Columbia University’s Lamont-Doherty Geological Observatory (LDGO) in 1970, where he conducted research on the Arctic Ocean, including studies of the Alpha-Mendeleev Ridge.

== Career ==
Hall began his professional career as a marine geophysicist at the Woods Hole Oceanographic Institution (WHOI) before moving to Israel in 1970. He became the first marine geophysicist at the Geological Survey of Israel (GSI), where he established the Israel National Bathymetric Survey.

Throughout his career, He was involved in the compilation of bathymetric data for various international projects, including the International Bathymetric Chart of the Mediterranean (IBCM) and the General Bathymetric Chart of the Oceans, where he contributed to the Mediterranean Sea bathymetry.

He also collaborate with University of Haifa and the University of New Hampshire's Center for Coastal and Ocean Mapping (UNH-CCOM), to furthered advancements in marine geophysics and geoinformatics.

He co-founded the Neev Center for Geoinformatics at the Hebrew University of Jerusalem (HUJI) in 2011. Hall also developed the first digital terrain model for Israel.

=== Hovercraft R/H Sabvabaa ===
Hall is also the owner of the research hovercraft R/H Sabvabaa, which he funded and designed the construction of in 2007 with Yngve Kristoffersen of Norway’s Bergen University. In recent years, the hovercraft has been involved in Antarctic research, where it continues to support scientific exploration of remote ice-covered marine environments.

== Personal life ==
He is married to Israeli engineer anfd scientist Chava Fischler. They moved to Israel in 1970 after Hall completed his Ph.D. Fischler received her M.Sc. in physics from Hebrew University, and a Ph.D. from the University of Delaware in 1966.

Hall's grandfather was the head of the American Chicle Company. An inheritance allowed Hall to privately purchase a swath sonar device and a hovercraft, both of which he has utilized in his research.

== Awards ==
Hall received the Israel Geological Society Raphael Freund Prize in 1999 and the Israel Cartographic Society Prize in 2004.

== Selected publications ==
- Hall, John Kendrick; Nilsen, Espen Harris; Kristoffersen, Yngve (2023). "The High Arctic Large Igneous Province: first seismic-stratigraphic evidence for multiple Mesozoic volcanic pulses on the Lomonosov Ridge, central Arctic Ocean". Journal of the Geological Society. 180 (5) jgs2022-153. Bibcode:2023JGSoc.180..153K. doi:10.1144/jgs2022-153. hdl:11250/3149893. ISSN 0016-7649.
- Hall, John K.; Keller, Chaim (2022). "Using a ray tracing program to calculate sunrise times over a digital terrain model based visible horizon using a simplified atmospheric model, part II". Computers & Geosciences. 161 105044. Bibcode:2022CG....16105044K. doi:10.1016/j.cageo.2022.105044.
- Kristoffersen, Yngve; Hall, John K.; Nilsen, Espen Harris (2022). "Sediment deformation atop the Lomonosov Ridge, central Arctic Ocean: Evidence for gas-charged sediment mobilization?". Marine and Petroleum Geology. 138 105555. Bibcode:2022MarPG.13805555K. doi:10.1016/j.marpetgeo.2022.105555. hdl:11250/3055632.
- Kristoffersen, Yngve; Hall, John K.; Nilsen, Espen Harris (2021-05-20). "Morris Jesup Spur and Rise north of Greenland – exploring present seabed features, the history of sediment deposition, volcanism and tectonic deformation at a Late Cretaceous/early Cenozoic triple junction in the Arctic Ocean". Norwegian Journal of Geology. doi:10.17850/njg101-1-4. hdl:11250/2989645.
- Jakobsson, Martin; Mayer, Larry A.; Bringensparr, Caroline; Castro, Carlos F.; Mohammad, Rezwan; Johnson, Paul; Ketter, Tomer; Accettella, Daniela; Amblas, David; An, Lu; Arndt, Jan Erik; Canals, Miquel; Casamor, José Luis; Chauché, Nolwenn; Coakley, Bernard (2020-07-09). "The International Bathymetric Chart of the Arctic Ocean Version 4.0". Scientific Data. 7 (1): 176. Bibcode:2020NatSD...7..176J. doi:10.1038/s41597-020-0520-9. ISSN 2052-4463. PMC 7347603. PMID 32647176.
- Gadol, Omri; Tibor, Gideon; ten Brink, Uri; Hall, John K.; Groves-Gidney, Gavrielle; Bar-Am, Gideon; Hübscher, Christian; Makovsky, Yizhaq (2020). "Semi-automated bathymetric spectral decomposition delineates the impact of mass wasting on the morphological evolution of the continental slope, offshore Israel". Basin Research. 32 (5): 1156–1183. Bibcode:2020BasR...32.1166G. doi:10.1111/bre.12420. hdl:1912/25407. ISSN 0950-091X.
- Reiche, Sönke; Hübscher, Christian; Brenner, Steve; Betzler, Christian; Hall, John K. (2018). "The role of internal waves in the late Quaternary evolution of the Israeli continental slope". Marine Geology. 406: 177–192. Bibcode:2018MGeol.406..177R. doi:10.1016/j.margeo.2018.09.013.
