= Sekaninaite =

Mg, Fe, Al cyclosilicate mineral

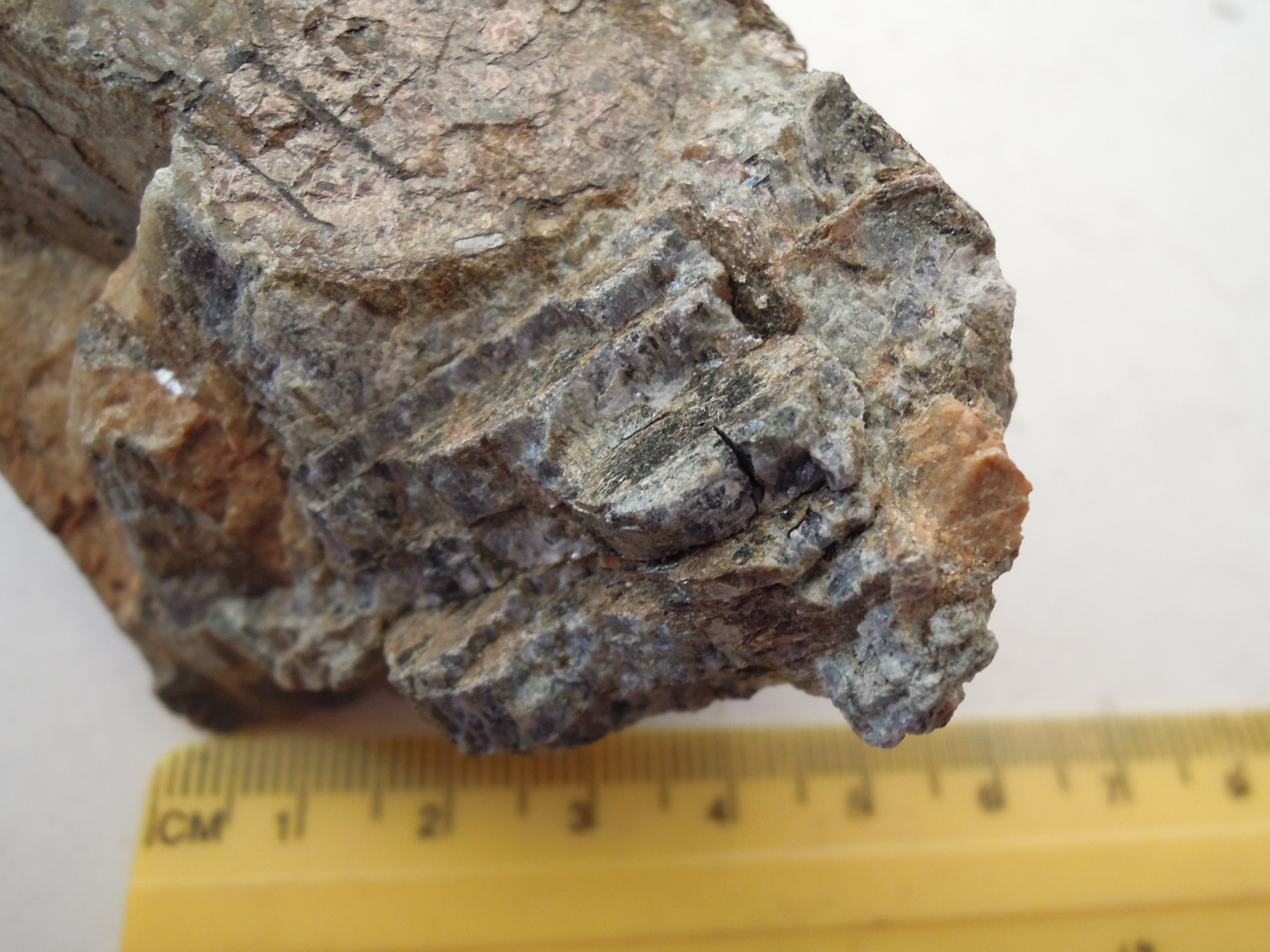
- Sekaninaite from Dolní Bory, Czech Republic

General
- Category: Cyclosilicate
- Formula: (Fe^{+2},Mg)_{2}Al_{4}Si_{5}O_{18}
- IMA symbol: Skn
- Strunz classification: 9.CJ.10
- Dana classification: 61.02.01.02; Cordierite group
- Crystal system: Orthorhombic
- Crystal class: Dipyramidal (mmm); H-M symbol: (2/m 2/m 2/m)
- Space group: Cccm
- Unit cell: a = 17.18 Å, b = 9.82 Å c = 9.29 Å; Z = 4

Identification
- Color: Blue to blue-violet
- Crystal habit: As poorly developed crystals
- Twinning: Commonly twinned on {110} and {310}
- Cleavage: {100}, imperfect; parting on {001}
- Mohs scale hardness: 7 – 7.5
- Luster: Vitreous
- Diaphaneity: Transparent to translucent
- Specific gravity: 2.76 – 2.77
- Optical properties: Biaxial (−)
- Refractive index: n_{α} = 1.561 n_{β} = 1.572 n_{γ} = 1.576
- Birefringence: δ = 0.015
- 2V angle: Measured: 66°, Calculated: 60°

Sekaninaite ((Fe^{+2},Mg)_{2}Al_{4}Si_{5}O_{18}) is a silicate mineral, the iron-rich analogue of cordierite.

It was first described in 1968 for an occurrence in Dolní Bory, Vysočina Region, Moravia, Czech Republic, and is now known also from Ireland, Japan, and Sweden. It was named after a Czech mineralogist, Josef Sekanina (1901–1986). In Brockley on Rathlin Island, Ireland sekaninaite occurs in bauxitic clay within the contact aureole of a diabase intrusive plug.

== Structure and composition ==
The chemical formula of sekaninaite is: $\ce{(Fe^2+, Mg^2+)2[Al4Si5O18]*\mathit{n}H2O}$. Grapes et al. (2010) calculated the percentage weights of the sample from Dolni Bory, This compound exists in nature in the form of two polymorphs: one having a disordered hexagonal structure and the other arranged in an ordered orthorhombic structure. As an aluminosilicate, the repeated and ordered structure is based on polymerization of one or the other's tetrahedral framework of Si, Al tetrahedra (Yakubovich et al., 2003). Nearly all analyses show excess of Al and deficiency in Si with respect to tetrahedral components. The overall substitution of alkalis causes excess in cations found in (K_{2}O, Na_{2}O, CaO), implying that sekaninaite is essentially anhydrous (Grapes et al., 2010).

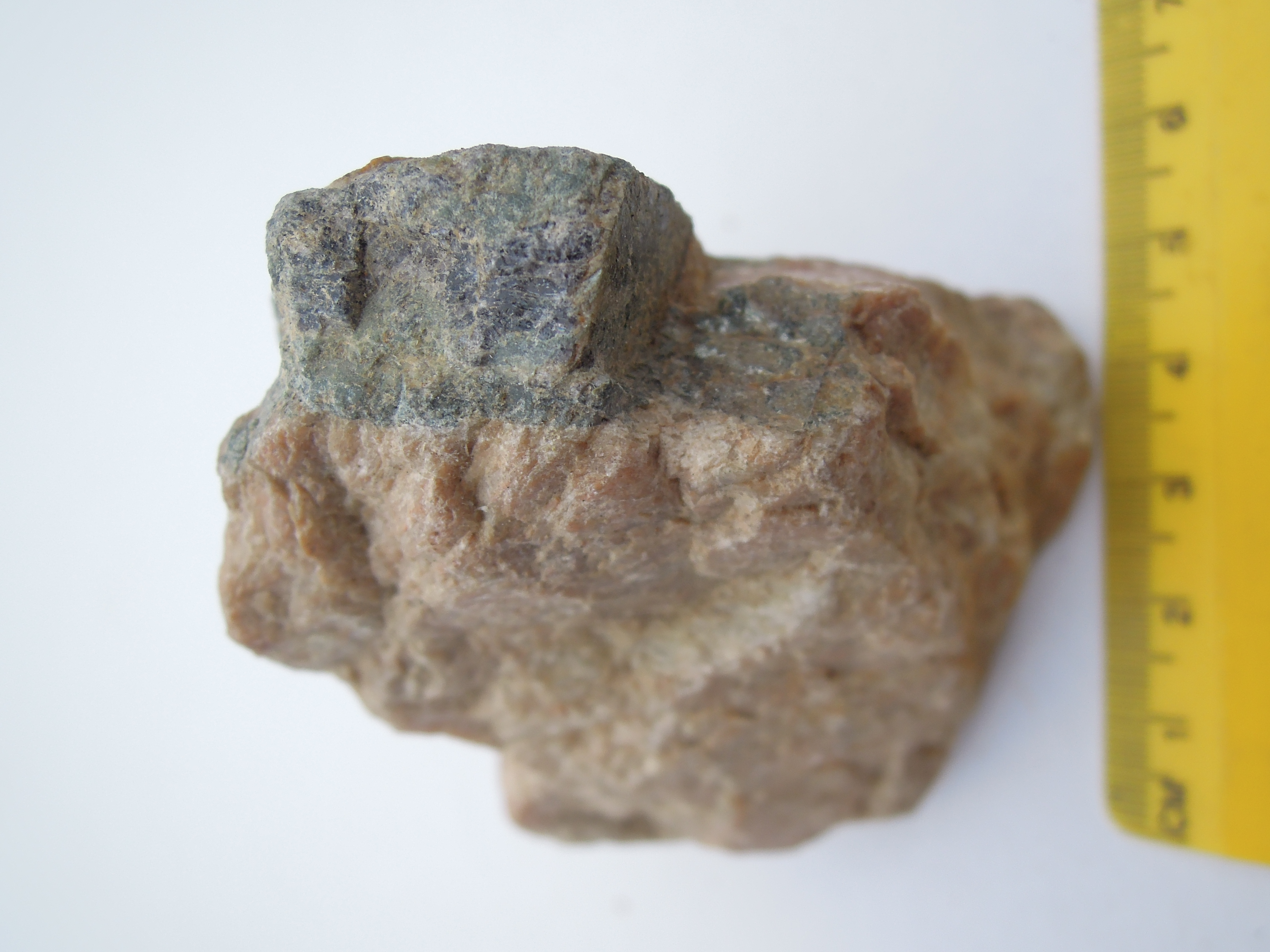
Sekaninaite on pegmatite rock

The atomic structures of cordierites are interpreted as a continuous series of structures that vary based on the content of octahedrally coordinated Mg and Fe cations. The varying content of atoms in the octahedral M position has an effect on the orthorhombic unit cell's parameters. The wide range of isomorphism of Mg and Fe(4–96%) suggest the existence of a continuous isomorphic series cordierite $\ce{(Mg,Fe)2[Al4Si4O18]*\mathit{n}H2O}$-sekaninaite $\ce{(Fe,Mg)2[Al4Si4O18]*\mathit{n}H2O}$. It is shown via crystallographic data that a shift in the iron content leads to a corresponding variance in a and b unit cell parameters (Yakubovich et al., 2003). As an aluminosilicate/cyclosilicate, the octahedral M-O distances consist of 5 independent tetrahedra form a 3-dimensional anionic framework of ordered and distributed Al^{3+} and Si^{4+} cations. One independent AlO_{4} and two SiO_{4} vortex-sharing tetrahedra share oxygen atoms to form six-member rings along the c axis of the unit cell. Mg, Fe octahedra share edges with SiO_{4} to form rings from alternating octahedra and tetrahedra. Thus, the framework can be described as a semi-layered structure formed of layers of tetrahedra linked into rings by sharing vertices and octahedra and tetrahedra sharing edges, alternating along the c axis. The distortion of the orthorhombic unit cell is determined by the chemical composition rather than the degree of ordering in the tetrahedral framework (Yakubovich et al., 2003). The temperature at which the liquidous phases crystallize in a sequence: mullite + tridymite, followed by sekaninaite and finally fayalite + clinoferrosilite (Grapes et al., 2010). Similar trends are observed for amphiboles, clinopyroxenes, olivines, and others. The increase in the Fe mole fraction of minerals was not related with iron input, but was caused by its redistribution during contact metamorphism (Korchak et al., 2010).

== Physical properties ==
Stanek and Miskovsky (1975) first identified and diagnosed sekaninaite as a new mineral in the cordierite series. They sampled the poorly developed crystals of the Dolni Bory region, Czechoslovakia, where specimen did not exceed 70 cm. Dolni Bory samples are very different from samples found in the Kuznetsk paralavas. They are very close analogues with respect to Mg/Fe ratios but vastly different a-, b- and c- parameters (Grapes et al., 2010). Grapes and colleagues calculated cell dimension to be a 17.230(5), b 9.835(3), c 9.314(3) A. The colour of sekaninaite is bright blue and distinctly pleochroic with X = colourless; Y = blue; Z = pale blue; absorption occurs in the sequence Y > Z > X. Sekaninaite has a hardness of 7–7.5; it cleaves imperfectly along {100} and exhibits parting on {001} (Fleischer and Jambor, 1977). Majority of crystals show zonation (Fe increasing from core to rim). It common twinned on {110} and {310}, simulating hexagonal symmetry. Sekaninaite is classified under the space group Cccm; it is an orthorhombic crystal that is found in series with cordierite (Stanek et al., 1975).

== Geologic occurrence and location ==
Sekaninaite was first discovered in the Dolni Bory region of the Czech Republic. Its occurrence is in the albite zone of pegmatite in granulites and gneisses (Fleischer and Jambor, 1977). Sekaninaite is found in pyrometamorphic rocks, extensively rocks formed via process of ancient combustion metamorphism; paralavas, clinkers and buchites. These combustion metamorphic rocks occur in clinker beds and breccias of vitrified sandstone-siltstone clinker fragments cemented by paralava. These partially baked and oxidized psammitic-pelitic sediments are associated with burnt coal seams, belonging to places like the Kuznetsk coal basin, Siberia (Grapes et al., 2010). Sekaninaite-Fe-cordierite exists in series and is largely dependent upon variations in solid solution. These minerals are more prevalent in paralavas found in: Power River, Wyoming, Ravat area, Tajikistan, Kenderlyk Basin, eastern Kazakhstan and the Djhar basin in India; each differ in sedimentary mineral assemblage and results depend on high-temperature fusion of mixtures of sandstone-siltstone and minor ferruginous components (Grapes et al., 2010). These Fe-rich paralavas are composed of Fe-olivine, esseneite, dorite, melilite, Fe-cordierite, anorthite, spinel, tridymite, fayalite, magnetite, quartz etc. (Novikova, 2009).

== See also ==
- List of minerals
- List of minerals named after people
