= Gugiaite =

Sorosilicate mineral

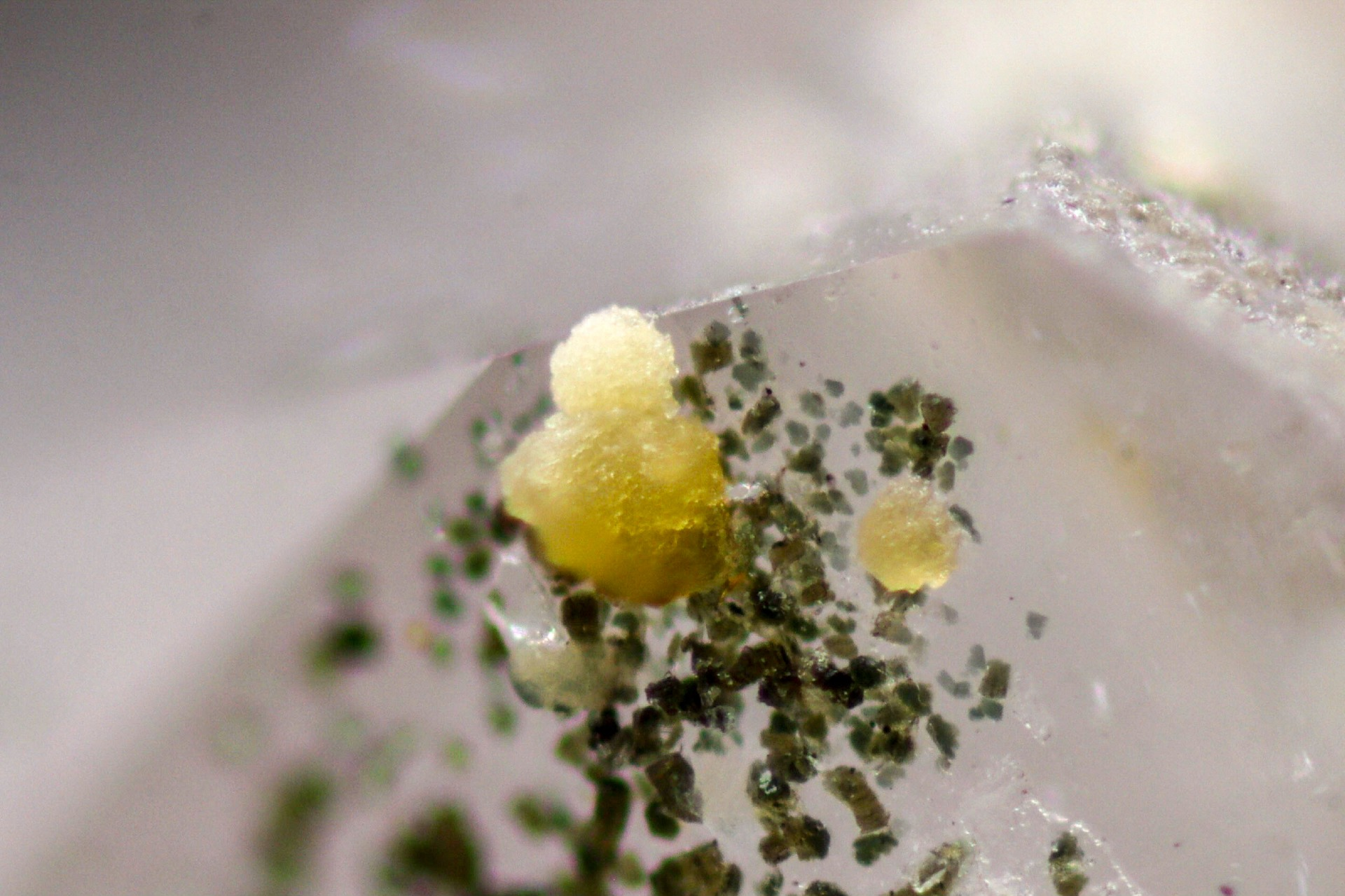

General
- Category: Sorosilicate
- Formula: Ca_{2}[BeSi_{2}O_{7}]
- IMA symbol: Gug
- Strunz classification: 9.BB.10
- Dana classification: 55.04.02.06
- Crystal system: Tetragonal
- Crystal class: Scalenohedral (4̅2m); H-M symbol: (4̅ 2m)
- Space group: P4̅2_{1}m
- Unit cell: a = 7.43, c = 5.024 [Å]; Z = 2

Identification
- Color: Colorless
- Cleavage: Perfect on {010}, distinct {001}, indistinct on {110}
- Fracture: Uneven – Flat surfaces (not cleavage) fractured in an uneven pattern
- Mohs scale hardness: 5
- Luster: Vitreous, glassy
- Streak: White
- Diaphaneity: Transparent
- Density: 3.03
- Optical properties: uniaxial (+)
- Refractive index: n_{ω} = 1.664 n_{ε} = 1.672
- Birefringence: δ = 0.008
- Other characteristics: strongly piezoelectric

Gugiaite is a melilite mineral, named for the Chinese village of Gugia where it was first discovered. Its chemical formula is Ca_{2}BeSi_{2}O_{7}. It occurs mostly in skarns with melanite adjacent to an alkali syenite and has no economic value. Its crystals are small tetragonal tablets with vitreous luster and perfect cleavage. It is colorless and transparent with a density of three. The mineral belongs to space group P4̅21m and is strongly piezoelectric.

Shortly after the discovery of gugiaite, it was noted that a new name was unnecessary as it could have been considered an end member of meliphanite, (Ca,Na)_{2}Be(Si,Al)_{2}(O,F)_{2} differing mainly in containing much less sodium and fluorine. Recent data have confirmed that gugiaite differs from meliphanite optically and structurally. Gugiaite is a melilite and is distinctly different from other beryllium minerals such as meliphanite and leucophanite. Gugiaite is named for its locality near the village of Gugia, China. Incongruent information exists regarding Gugia; consequently the actual location of this village within China is unclear (de Fourestier 2005). Gujia is most often referenced as being in either Jiangsu Province or Liaoning Province.

== Composition ==
Gugiaite has an ideal chemical formula of Ca_{2}BeSi_{2}O_{7} and is a member of the melilite and sorosilicate (Si_{2}O_{7}) groups. It is chemically similar to jeffreyite (Ca,Na)_{2}[(Be,Al)Si_{2}(O,OH)_{7}], meliphanite (Ca,Na)_{2}[Be(Si,Al)_{2}O_{6}(O,OH,F)], and leucophanite (Ca,Na)_{2}[Be(Si,Al)_{2}O_{6}(O,F)] in that they all contain essential calcium, beryllium, and silicon. Two chemical analyses gave similar results and one is as follows: SiO_{2} 44.90, Al_{2}O_{3} 2.17, Fe_{2}O_{3} 0.11, MnO 0.07, MgO 0.38, CaO 40.09, BeO 9.49, Na_{2}O 0.72, K_{2}O} 0.20, H_{2}O^{−} 0.36, H_{2}O^{+} 0.90, F 0.25, Cl 0.18, P_{2}O_{5} 0.08, TiO_{2} trace, -O=(F,Cl)_{2} 0.15, sum 99.94, 99.79%. Common impurities are Ti, Zr, Hf, Al, Fe, Mn, Mg, Na, K, F, Cl, and P.

== Geologic occurrence ==
Gugiaite is usually found in skarn in contact with alkaline syenite with melanite, orthoclase, aegirine, titanite, apatite, vesuvianite, and prehnite. It occurs as thin square tablets, to 3 mm, in small cavities in skarn and enclosed in melanite. Skarns are often formed at the contact zone between granite intrusions and carbonate sedimentary rocks through metasomatism. Gugiaite has also been found in a miarolitic cavity in granite. This type of cavity is crystal lined, irregular, and known for being a source of rare minerals, such as beryllium, that are not normally found in abundance in igneous rocks. While initially found in Gugia, China, its localities have expanded to include Piedmont, Italy, Ehime Prefecture, Japan, Eastern Siberian Region, Russia, and most recently Telemark, Norway.

== Crystal structure ==
Gugiaite is composed of infinite sheets of tetrahedra with Be-Si-Si linkages and interstitial Ca. As shown in Figure 1, the oxygen atom bonds to a [4]-coordinated high-valence cation, Si, to produce a discontinuous polymerization of tetrahedra linked by interstitial Ca. It is isostructural with akermanite (Ca_{2}MgSi_{2}O_{7}) with Be occupying the Mg site of akermanite. X-ray studies by the Weissenberg method show gugiaite to be tetragonal, space group P4̅21m, (space group Nr. 113), and H-M Symbol 4̅2m. Cell dimensions are: a = b = 7.48(2) Ȧ, c = 5.044(3) Ȧ, V = 277.35 Ȧ, α = β = γ = 90◦, and Z = 2. The axial ratio is a:c = 1:0.67617. Structurally A is Ca_{2}, T1 is BeO_{4}, T2 is SiO_{4}, and X is O_{7}. The three strongest lines of the X-ray powder data for gugiaite are 2.765(10), 1.485(7), and 1.709(7).

== Physical properties ==
The crystal form of gugiaite occurs as thin tetragonal tablets mostly 2–3 mm across and 0.3–0.5 mm thick, shown in Figure 2 below. The cleavages are {010} perfect, {001} distinct, and {110} poor. It is transparent, optically uniaxial (+), and strongly piezoelectric. See Table for additional physical properties.

== Significance ==
Gugiaite does not appear to have any political significance or economic value. From a historical perspective, gugiaite was the first beryllium mineral found in skarn systems at contacts between alkaline rocks and limestones. Also, thermodynamic equilibrium studies involving gugiaite have been conducted to determine the distribution of beryllium between gaseous and solid phases as a function of temperature in attempts to deduce the processes that formed the Solar System.
