= Ye'elimite =

Natural form of anhydrous calcium sulfoaluminate

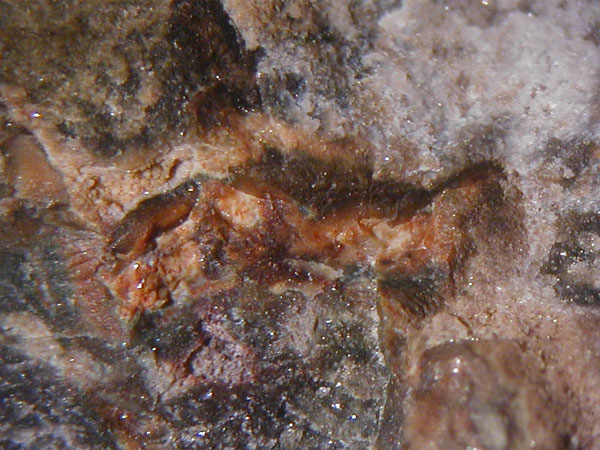
- Ye'elimite (white) intergrown with Hydroxylellestadite (reddish-brown) in grey Anhydrite from Ronneburg, Thuringia, Germany (Picture size 6 mm)

General
- Category: Sulfate mineral
- Formula: Ca_{4}(AlO_{2})_{6}SO_{4}
- IMA symbol: Ye
- Strunz classification: 7.BC.15
- Crystal system: Isometric
- Crystal class: Gyroidal (432); H-M symbol: (432)
- Space group: I4_{1}32
- Unit cell: a = 18.392 Å; Z = 16

Identification
- Color: White, gray

Ye'elimite is the naturally occurring form of anhydrous calcium sulfoaluminate, Ca_{4}(AlO_{2})_{6}SO_{4}. It gets its name from Har Ye'elim in Israel in the Hatrurim Basin west of the Dead Sea where it was first found in nature by Shulamit Gross, an Israeli mineralogist and geologist who studied the Hatrurim Formation.

The mineral is cubic, with 16 formula units per unit cell, and a cell dimension of 1.8392 nm, and is readily detected and quantified in mixtures by powder x-ray diffraction.

== Occurrence in cement ==
It is alternatively called "Klein's Compound", after Alexander Klein of the University of California, Berkeley, who experimented with sulfoaluminate cements around 1960, although it was first described in 1957 by Ragozina. Ye'elimite is most commonly encountered as a constituent of sulfoaluminate cements, in which it is manufactured on the million-tonne-per-annum scale. It also occasionally occurs adventitiously in Portland-type cements. It is thus an anhydrous mineral of the cement clinker whose idealized oxide formula 4CaO·3Al_{2}O_{3}·SO_{3} is also written C_{4}A_{3}S̅ in the cement chemist notation (CCN). On hydration in the presence of calcium and sulfate ions, it forms the insoluble, fibrous mineral ettringite, which provides the strength in sulfoaluminate concretes, monosulfoaluminate, and aluminium hydroxide.

It is manufactured by heating the appropriate quantities of finely-ground alumina, calcium carbonate and calcium sulfate to between 1100 and 1300 °C, preferably in the presence of small quantities of fluxing materials, such as Fe_{2}O_{3}. On heating above 1350 °C, ye'elimite begins to decompose to tricalcium aluminate, calcium oxide, sulfur dioxide and oxygen.

== See also ==
- Other rare minerals also discovered in the Hatrurim Formation:
  - Brownmillerite (Ca_{2}(Al,Fe)_{2}O_{5})
  - Gehlenite (Ca_{2}Al[AlSiO_{7}])
- Other phases also present in the cement clinker:
  - Larnite: calcium olivine (Ca_{2}SiO_{4}, C_{2}S, or belite)
  - Mayenite (Ca_{12}Al_{14}O_{32}[☐_{4}Cl_{2}])
- Calcium aluminates:
  - Monocalcium aluminate (CA)
  - Tricalcium aluminate (C_{3}A)
  - Dodecacalcium hepta-aluminate (C_{12}A_{7})
- Calcium aluminate cements
