= Zadovite =

General
- Category: Phosphate minerals
- Formula: BaCa_{6}[(SiO_{4})(PO_{4})](PO_{4})_{2}F
- IMA symbol: Zad
- Crystal system: Trigonal
- Crystal class: Hexagonal scalenohedral (3̅m); H-M symbol: (3̅ 2m)
- Space group: R3̅m
- Unit cell: a = 7.0966, c = 25.7284 [Å]; Z = 3

Identification
- Color: Colorless
- Fracture: Irregular/uneven
- Luster: Vitreous
- Streak: White
- Diaphaneity: Transparent

Zadovite is an extremely rare mineral with formula BaCa_{6}[(SiO_{4})(PO_{4})](PO_{4})_{2}F. Together with its vanadium-analogue, aradite, zadovite occur in paralavas (type of pyrometamorphic rocks). Both minerals have structures similar to nabimusaite, and these three minerals occur in the Hatrurim Formation of Israel. Structure of all three minerals is related to that of hatrurite. Minerals combining barium, phosphorus and silicon together are scarce.
