= Acicular (crystal habit) =

Crystal shape resembling slender needles

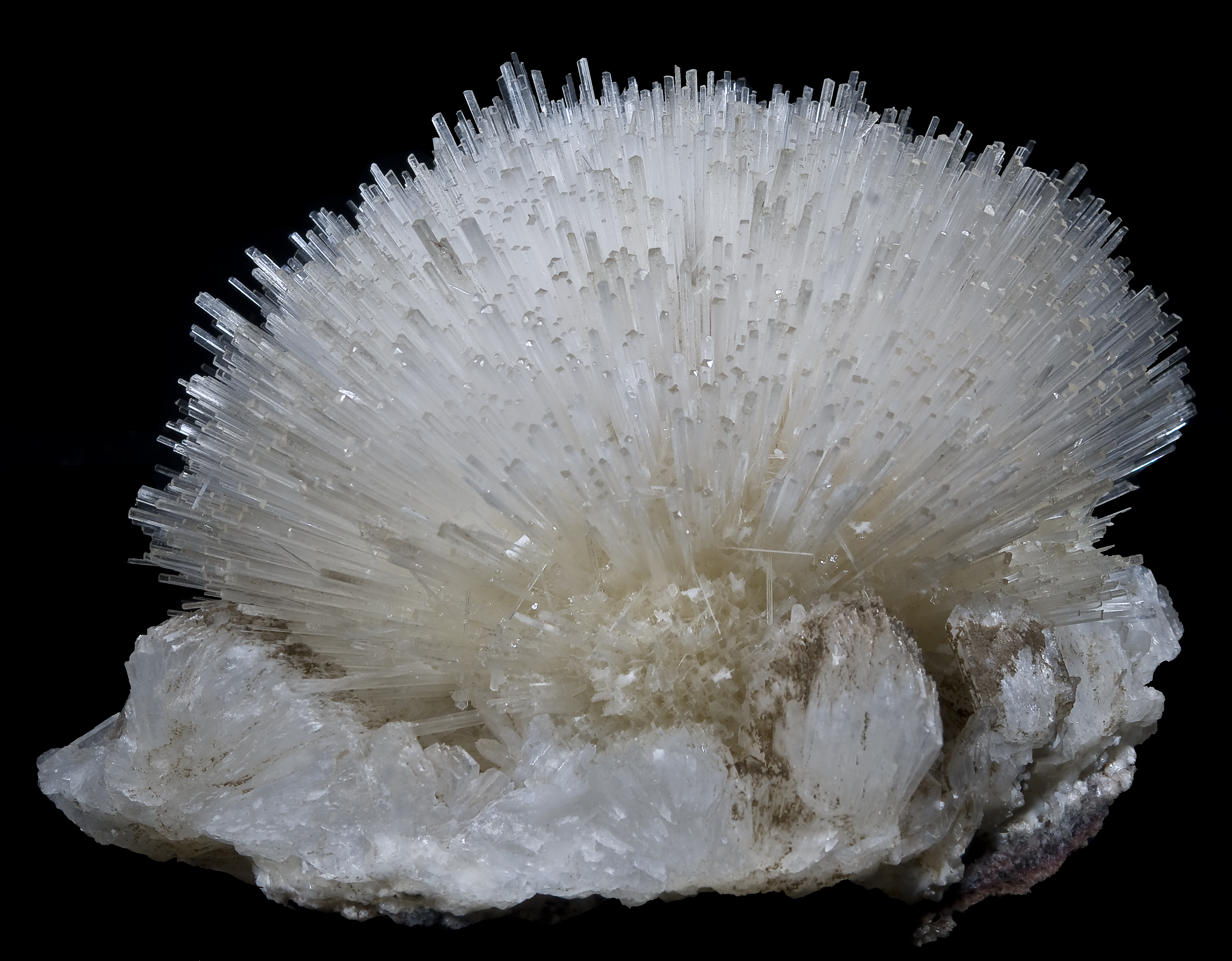
Natrolite showing acicular crystal habit

In mineralogy, acicular refers to a crystal habit composed of slender, needle-like crystals. Crystals with this habit tend to be fragile; complete, undamaged acicular specimens are uncommon.

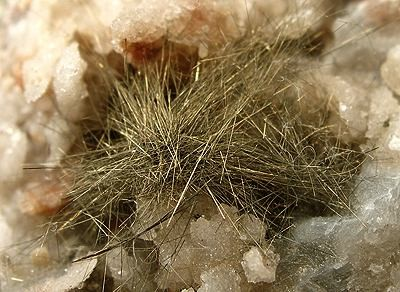
Needle-shaped acicular millerite crystals on white quartz

The term "acicular" derives from the Late Latin acicula meaning "little needle". Strictly speaking, the word refers to a growth habit that is slender and tapering to a point. Prismatic crystals are not acicular; however, colloquial usage has altered the commonly understood meaning of the word. When writing for mineralogical publications, authors should restrict their usage of "acicular" to crystals with the tapering growth habit.

To add to the confusion, some minerals are described with various morphological terms. For example, natrolite is often described as slender prismatic and millerite is often described as filiform or capillary.

== Examples ==
Minerals with an acicular habit include mesolite, natrolite, malachite, gypsum, rutile, brochantite and bultfonteinite. Crystals of dimethyltryptamine have an acicular habit, but this substance is not regarded as a mineral by the International Mineralogical Association. A acicular phase of steel is bainite.

== Differences from other habits ==
Some minerals like creedite form prismatic crystals that appear to be acicular, but are instead prismatic in a bladelike form; these can be told apart by the fact that all prismatic crystals are less sharp, sometimes are tipped with a pyramidal shape, and keep a standard cross-section shape with straight edges. Acicular crystals differ from fibrous crystals in their thickness; crystals with a fibrous habit are much thinner, sometimes to the point of being flexible like hair, while acicular crystals are thicker and more rigid.

== See also ==
- Abnormal grain growth
- Zeolite
