= Dargaite =

Barium-analogue mineral

General
- Category: Minerals
- Formula: BaCa_{12}(SiO_{4})_{4}(SO_{4})_{2}O_{3}

Dargaite is a rare mineral with formula BaCa_{12}(SiO_{4})_{4}(SO_{4})_{2}O_{3}. It is the barium-analogue of nabimusaite, also differing from it in the lack of fluorine. It is one of many recently approved new minerals coming from the Hatrurim complex. Dargaite, as nabimusaite, is trigonal (space group R-3m).
