= Tilleyite =

Calcium sorosilicate mineral

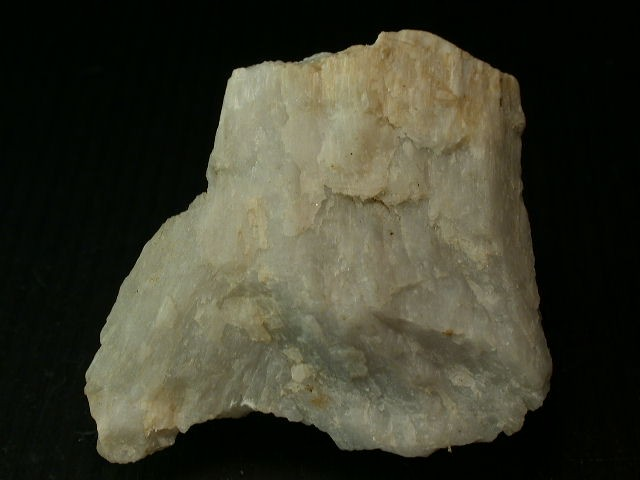
- Tilleyite collected from Crestmore quarries, Riverside County, California

General
- Category: Sorosilicate
- Formula: Ca_{3}[Si_{2}O_{7}]·2CaCO_{3}
- IMA symbol: Tly
- Strunz classification: 9.BE.82
- Crystal system: Monoclinic
- Crystal class: Prismatic (2/m) (same H-M symbol)
- Space group: P2_{1}/b
- Unit cell: a = 15.108(3) Å b = 10.241(1) Å c = 7.579(1) Å β = 105.17(1)° Z = 4

Identification
- Colour: Colourless, white
- Twinning: Simple twinning {100}, often lamellar; α:twin plane ~ 24°
- Cleavage: {201} perfect; {100} and {010} poor
- Luster: Vitreous, Dull
- Streak: White
- Diaphaneity: Transparent to translucent
- Specific gravity: 2.838 - 2.88
- Optical properties: Monoclinic (+)
- Refractive index: n_{α} = 1.605 - 1.617 n_{β} = 1.626 - 1.635 n_{γ} = 1.651 - 1.654
- Birefringence: δ = 0.035 - 0.046
- 2V angle: 85-89°
- Dispersion: r < v

Tilleyite is a rarely occurring calcium sorosilicate mineral with formula Ca_{3}[Si_{2}O_{7}]·2CaCO_{3} (sometimes represented as Ca_{5}(CaCO_{3})_{2}[Si_{2}O_{7}]). It is chemically a calcium silicate with additional carbonate ions. Tilleyite crystallizes in the monoclinic crystal system and forms only poorly developed, irregularly defined, tabular crystals and spherical grains. In its pure form it is colorless and transparent, however due to multiple refractions of light from lattice defects or polycrystalline formation, it can also appear white, with the transparency decreasing accordingly.

== History ==
Tilleyite was first described from an occurrence at the Crestmore Quarry in Riverside County, California in 1932 by Esper Larsen and Kingsley Dunham, and named after Cecil Edgar Tilley (1894–1973), a professor of geology at the University of Cambridge, in recognition of his contributions to the study of metamorphism. Its type material is held at Harvard University, and the National Museum of Natural History.

== Crystal structure ==
Tilleyite crystallizes monoclinically in the space group P2_{1}/a (space group no. 14, position 3) with the lattice parameters a = 15.11 Å; b = 10.24Å; c = 7.58 Å,and β = 105.2°, with 4 formula units per unit cell.

== Formation and occurrence ==
Tilleyite is formed by contact metamorphism in the zone between volcanics and limestones at low pressure and high temperatures. Associated minerals include calcite, fluorite, gehlenite, grossular, vesuvianite and wollastonite.

More generally, it occurs at gabbro-limestone contacts, such as at Carlingford, Ireland, and on the island of Muck, Scotland.

== See also ==
- List of minerals
