= Cordierite =

Mg, Fe, Al cyclosilicate mineral

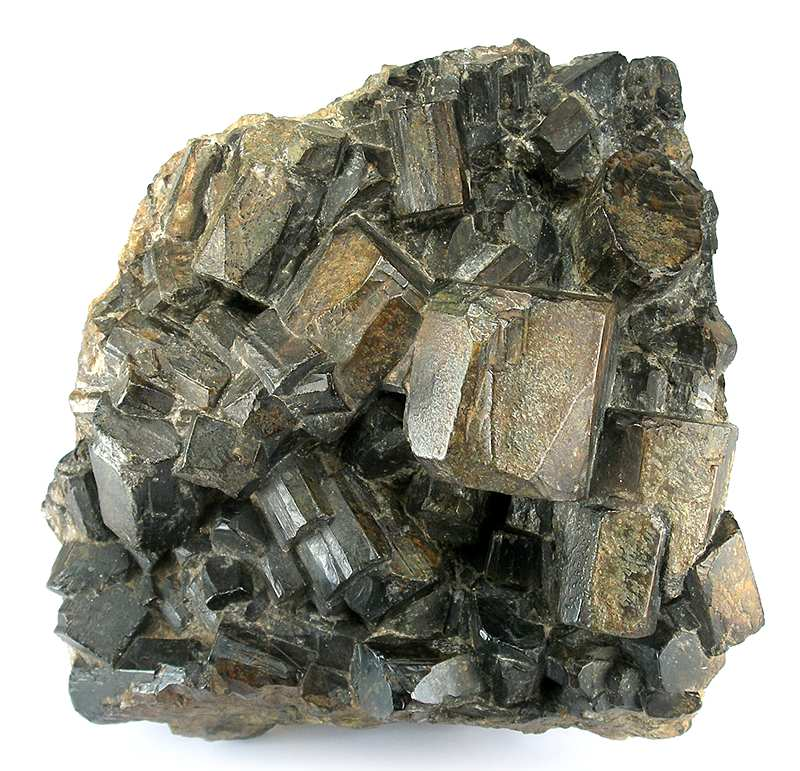

General
- Category: Cyclosilicate
- Formula: (Mg,Fe)_{2}Al_{4}Si_{5}O_{18}
- IMA symbol: Crd
- Strunz classification: 9.CJ.10
- Dana classification: 61.02.01.01; Cordierite group
- Crystal system: Orthorhombic
- Crystal class: Dipyramidal (mmm); H-M symbol: (2/m 2/m 2/m)
- Space group: Cccm
- Unit cell: a = 17.079 Å, b = 9.730 Å, c = 9.356 Å; Z = 4

Identification
- Color: Blue, smoky blue, bluish violet; greenish, yellowish brown, gray; colorless to very pale blue in thin section in transmitted light
- Crystal habit: Pseudo-hexagonal prismatic twins, as imbedded grains, and massive
- Twinning: Common on {110}, {130}, simple, lamellar, cyclical
- Cleavage: Fair on {100}, poor on {001} and {010}
- Fracture: Subconchoidal
- Tenacity: Brittle
- Mohs scale hardness: 7–7.5
- Luster: Greasy or vitreous
- Streak: White
- Diaphaneity: Transparent to translucent
- Specific gravity: 2.57–2.66
- Optical properties: Usually optically (-), sometimes (+); 2V = 0–90°
- Refractive index: n_{α} = 1.527 – 1.560 n_{β} = 1.532 – 1.574 n_{γ} = 1.538 – 1.578 Indices increase with Fe content.
- Pleochroism: X = pale yellow, green; Y = violet, blue-violet; Z = pale blue
- Fusibility: on thin edges
- Diagnostic features: Resembles quartz, can be distinguished by pleochroism. Can be distinguished from corundum by its lower hardness

Cordierite (mineralogy) or iolite (gemology) is a magnesium iron aluminium cyclosilicate. Iron is almost always present, and a solid solution exists between Mg-rich cordierite and Fe-rich sekaninaite with a series formula: (Mg,Fe)_{2}Al_{3}(Si_{5}AlO_{18}) to (Fe,Mg)_{2}Al_{3}(Si_{5}AlO_{18}). A high-temperature polymorph exists, indialite, which is isostructural with beryl and has a random distribution of Al in the (Si,Al)_{6}O_{18} rings. Cordierite is also synthesized and used in high temperature applications such as catalytic converters and pizza stones.

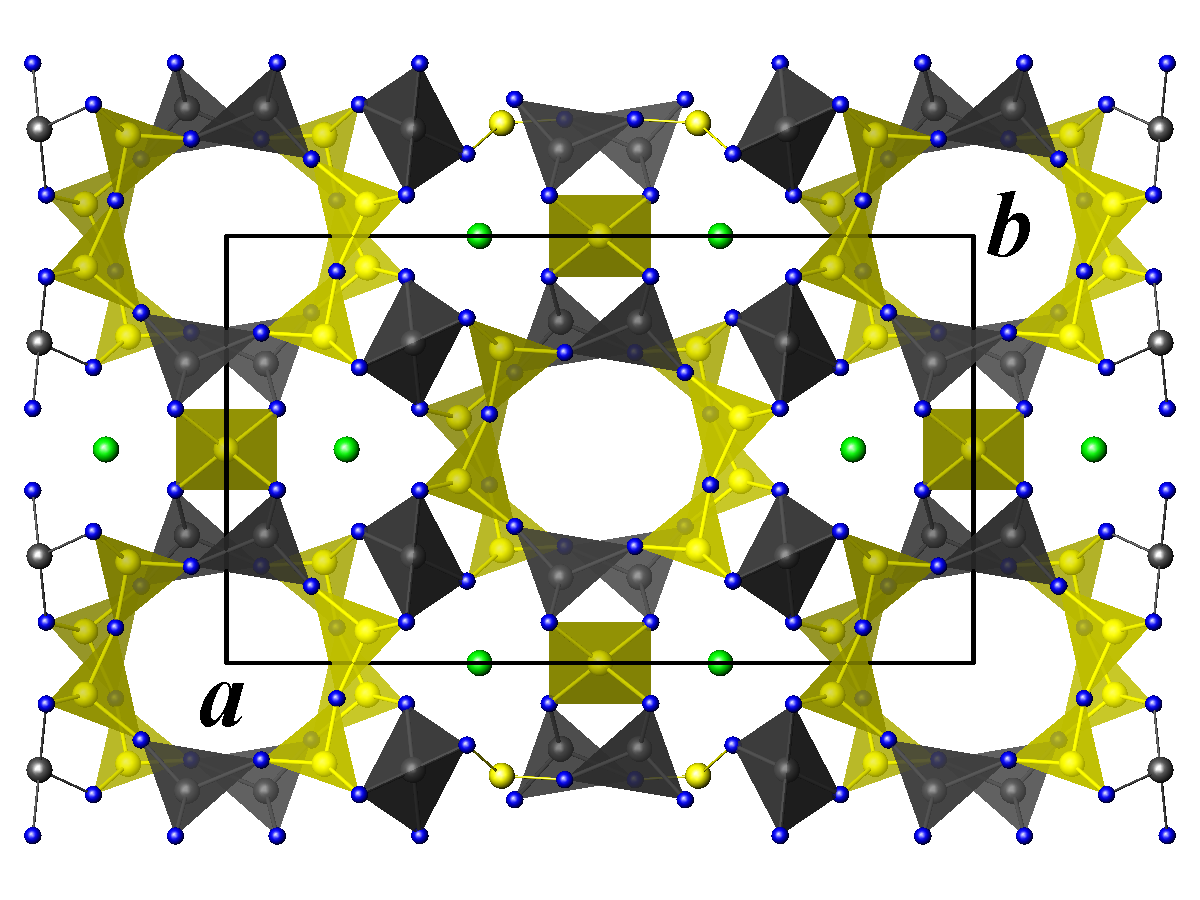
Crystal structure of Cordierite. Green – Mg or Fe, blue – O, yellow – Si and Al.

== Name and discovery ==
Cordierite, which was discovered in 1813, in specimens from Níjar, Almería, Spain, is named after the French geologist Louis Cordier (1777–1861).

== Occurrence ==
Cordierite typically occurs in contact or regional metamorphism of pelitic rocks. It is especially common in hornfels produced by contact metamorphism of pelitic rocks. Two common metamorphic mineral assemblages include sillimanite-cordierite-spinel and cordierite-spinel-plagioclase-orthopyroxene. Other associated minerals include garnet (cordierite-garnet-sillimanite gneisses) and anthophyllite. Cordierite also occurs in some granites, pegmatites, and norites in gabbroic magmas. Alteration products include mica, chlorite, and talc. Cordierite occurs, for example, in the granite contact zone at Geevor Tin Mine in Cornwall.

== Commercial use ==
Catalytic converters are commonly made from ceramics containing a large proportion of synthetic cordierite. The manufacturing process deliberately aligns the cordierite crystals to make use of the very low thermal expansion along one axis. This prevents thermal shock cracking from taking place when the catalytic converter is used.

== Gem variety ==
As the transparent variety iolite, it is often used as a gemstone. The name "iolite" comes from the Greek word for violet. Another old name is dichroite, a Greek word meaning "two-colored rock", a reference to cordierite's strong pleochroism. It has also been called "water-sapphire" and "Vikings' Compass" because of its usefulness in determining the direction of the sun on overcast days, the Vikings having used it for this purpose. This works by determining the direction of polarization of the sky overhead. Light scattered by air molecules is polarized, and the direction of the polarization is at right angles to a line to the sun, even when the sun's disk itself is obscured by dense fog or lies just below the horizon.

Gem quality iolite varies in color from sapphire blue to blue violet to yellowish gray to light blue as the light angle changes. Iolite is sometimes used as an inexpensive substitute for sapphire. It is much softer than sapphires and is abundantly found in Australia (Northern Territory), Brazil, Burma, Canada (Yellowknife area of the Northwest Territories), India, Madagascar, Namibia, Sri Lanka, Tanzania and the United States (Connecticut). The largest iolite crystal found weighed more than 24,000 carats (4,800 g), and was discovered in Wyoming, US.

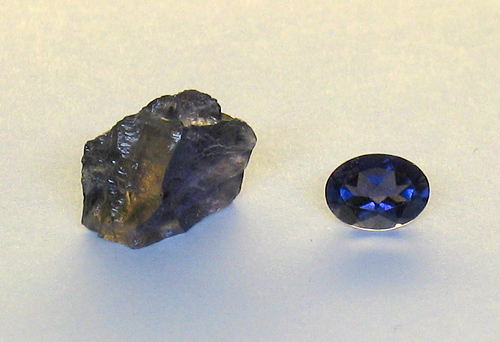
Left: rough specimen showing dichroism; right: cut stone

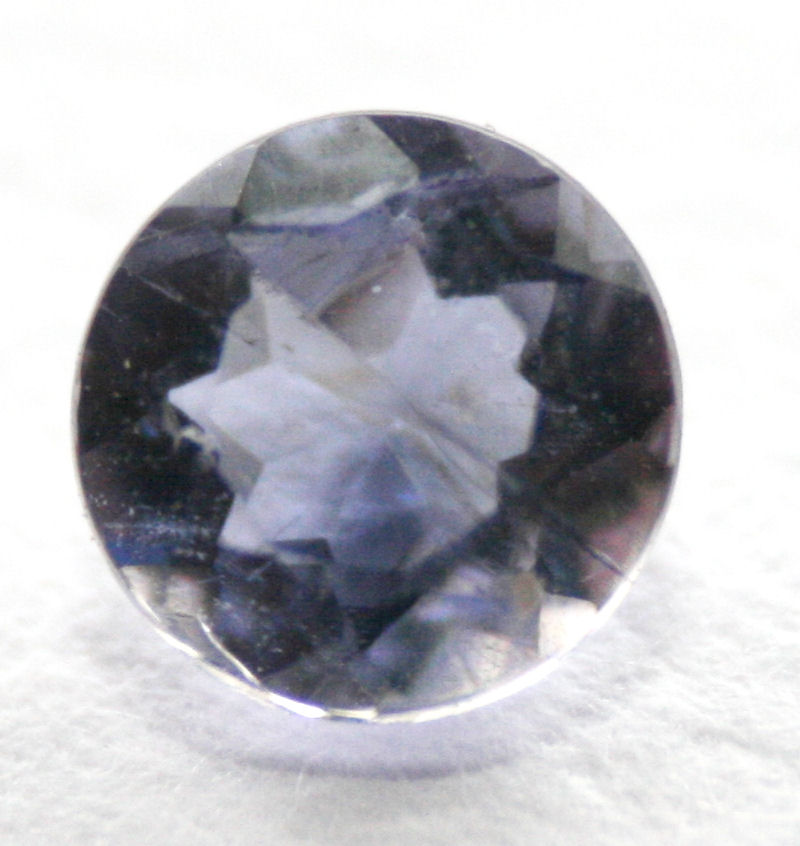
Facet cut iolite gemstone

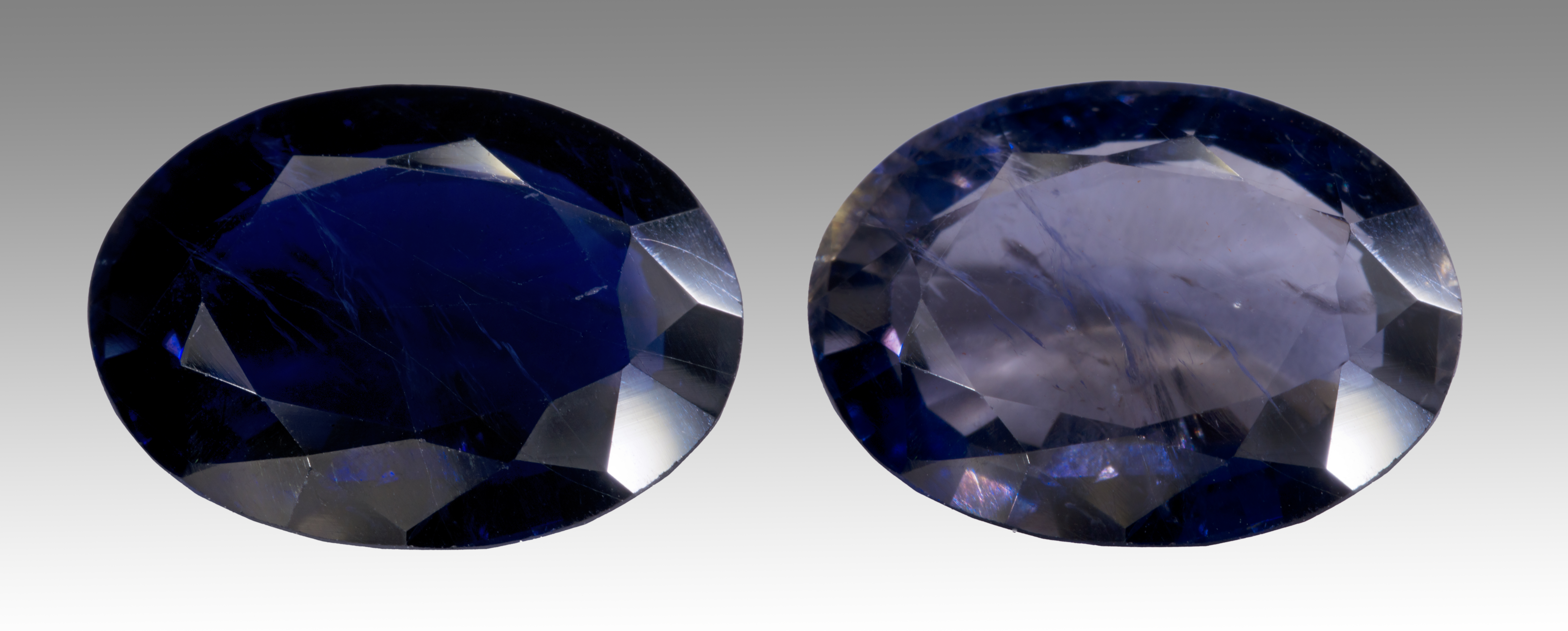
Pleochroism of cordierite

Another name for blue iolite is steinheilite, after Fabian Steinheil, the Russian military governor of Finland who observed that it was a different mineral from quartz. Praseolite is another iolite variety which results from heat treatment. It should not be confused with prasiolite.

== Applications ==
Cordierite is used in manufacturing kiln furniture for its impressive thermal shock resistance, which allows it to withstand rapid temperature changes without cracking. It is also employed to produce insulation equipment and electric heating elements in fuses, thermostats, and lighting technology.

In the automotive industry, cordierite is used in catalytic converters due to its excellent thermal stability and low thermal expansion. It forms the honeycomb substrates within the converters, which support the catalytic coating that reduces harmful emissions.

== See also ==
- List of minerals
- List of minerals named after people
- Sunstone (medieval)
