= Åkermanite =

Sorosilicate mineral

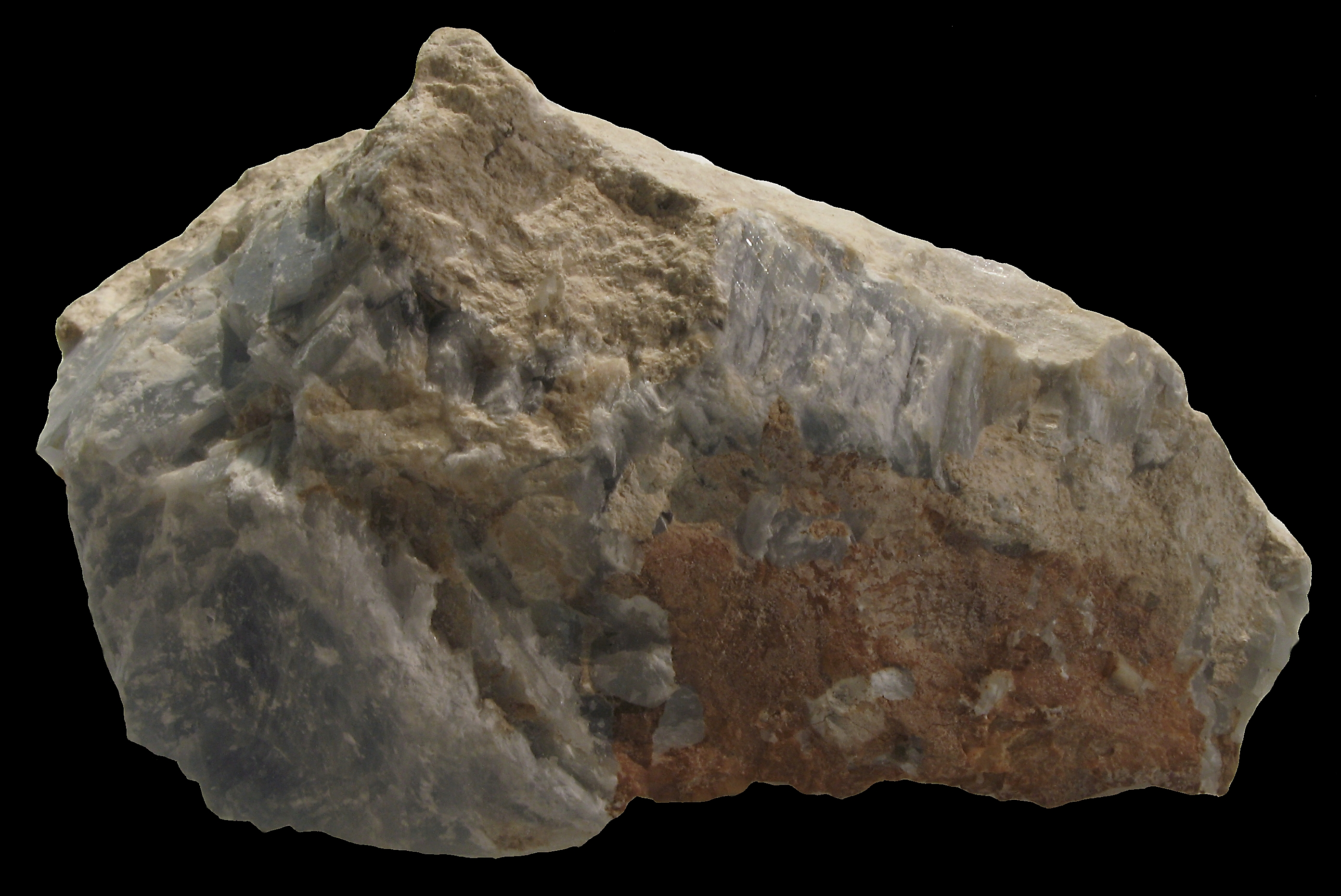
- Åkermanite (yellowish brown), calcite (blue), foshagite (hillebrandite variety, fibrous), tilleyite (creamy)

General
- Category: Sorosilicates
- Formula: Ca_{2}Mg(Si_{2}O_{7})
- IMA symbol: Åk
- Strunz classification: 9.BB.10
- Dana classification: 55.4.1.1 (8 ed)
- Crystal system: Tetragonal
- Crystal class: Scalenohedral (4̅2m); H-M symbol: (4̅ 2m)
- Space group: P4̅2_{1}m
- Unit cell: a = 7.8288(8) c = 5.0052(2) [Å]; Z = 2

Identification
- Color: Colorless, yellowish gray, green, brown
- Cleavage: Distinct on {001}, poor on {110}
- Fracture: Irregular/ uneven, conchoidal
- Tenacity: Brittle
- Mohs scale hardness: 5–6
- Luster: Vitreous, resinous
- Streak: White
- Diaphaneity: Transparent, translucent
- Specific gravity: 2.944
- Optical properties: Uniaxial (+)
- Refractive index: n_{ω} = 1.632 n_{ε} = 1.640
- Birefringence: δ = 0.008
- Pleochroism: none

Åkermanite (Ca_{2}Mg[Si_{2}O_{7}]) is a melilite mineral of the sorosilicate group, containing calcium, magnesium, silicon, and oxygen. It is a product of contact metamorphism of siliceous limestones and dolomites, and rocks of sanidinite facies. Sanidinite facies represent the highest conditions of temperature of contact metamorphism and are characterized by the absence of hydrous minerals. It has a density of 2.944 g/cm^{3}. Åkermanite ranks a 5 or 6 on the Mohs scale of mineral hardness, and can be found gray, green, brown, or colorless. It has a white streak and a vitreous or resinous luster. It has a tetragonal crystal system and a good, or distinct, cleavage. It is the end member in a solid solution series beginning with gehlenite (Ca_{2}Al[AlSiO_{7}]).

The mineral is named for Anders Richard Åkerman (Swedish page) (1837–1922), a Swedish metallurgist. It has been found at Monte Somma and Vesuvius, and Monte Cavalluccio near Rome. It was "grandfathered" in as a species of mineral because it was described prior to 1959, before the founding of the International Mineralogical Association.
