= Israel Geological Society =

National Geological Organization of Israel

- Founded: 1954
- Type: Professional Organization
- Region served: Israel
- Method: Conferences, Publications, Training
- Members: 400
- Key people: .
- Revenue: ·
- Endowment: ·
- Employees: .
- Volunteers: ·
- Website: www.igs.org.il

The Israel Geological Society (IGS) is a non-profit organization that is the national organization for geologists in Israel, including those working in academic institutions, research institutions and commercial organizations; it is also open to private individuals interested in earth sciences. The IGS has 400 members, including students, retired individuals and new immigrants. The society is administrated by an annually elected committee, which includes the President and the Vice President and five committee members. The society's activities are funded by the annual membership fee and by contributions from various institutions and organizations.

== Activities ==
Main activities of the IGS:

- The Annual Meeting, for the presentation and discussion of current topics of interest in its fields, including lectures, posters and field excursion.
- Earth Sciences Day, with lectures open to the general public.
- The Israel Journal of Earth Sciences, a professional journal. It is published annually in English in four issues. The journal is a primary journal for the publication of Earth Sciences research in the region, and is distributed to all society members and to libraries in Israel and abroad.
- Society Awards—annual awards for research achievements in earth sciences and a medal for outstanding contribution to public awareness of the subject. The awards are the Raphael (Rafi) Freund Award, the Peretz Grader Award, the Society Award for Applied Research, and the Geological Society Medal. The society also grants honorary membership to exceptional members of the society.
