= Kalsilite =

Vitreous white to grey feldspathoidal mineral

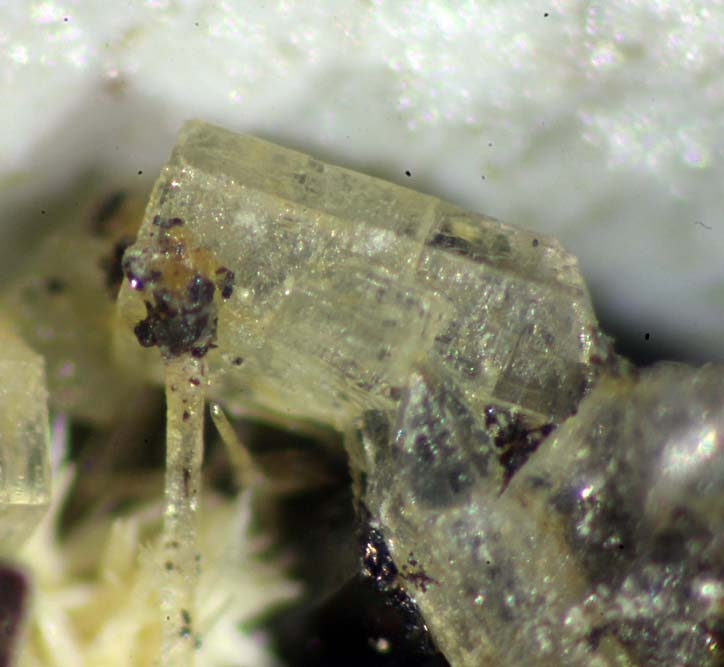

General
- Category: Tectosilicate minerals
- Group: Feldspathoid group
- Formula: KAlSiO_{4}
- IMA symbol: Kls
- Crystal system: Hexagonal
- Crystal class: 6 2 2 – Trapezohedral
- Space group: P6_{3}22 (no. 182)

Identification
- Color: Colorless, white, gray
- Tenacity: Brittle
- Mohs scale hardness: 6
- Luster: Vitreous, greasy
- Streak: White
- Diaphaneity: Transparent, Translucent
- Specific gravity: 2.59–2.62

Kalsilite (KAlSiO_{4}) is a vitreous white to grey feldspathoidal mineral that is found in some potassium-rich lavas, such as from Chamengo Crater in Uganda. It has a relative hardness of 5.5.
