= Pyrometamorphism =

Metamorphism resulting from combustion of coal or hydrocarbon deposits

Pyrometamorphism is a type of metamorphism in which rocks are rapidly changed by heat, e.g. coming from a rapidly emplaced extrusive or intrusive igneous rock or from a fossil fuel fire. The rocks produced by pyrometamorphism include buchite, clinker and paralava, formed due to melting and/or recrystallisation of sedimentary rocks. Both natural and anthropogenic examples of sites with active pyrometamorphism are known. One well-known area of natural pyrometamorphic rocks is the Hatrurim Formation with outcrops all around the Dead Sea Basin: in the Negev Desert in Israel, in the Judaean Desert on the West Bank, and in western Jordan. Xenoliths of sedimentary rocks trapped in volcanic lava may undergo pyrometamorphic transformation, as can some contact wallrocks. Anthropogenic pyrometamorphic rocks are found in burning coal-mining dumps (red shales). A great number of minerals, sometimes very rare, are found within these rocks. Of the silicate minerals, the typical ones are especially cordierite, indialite, fayalite, mullite, tridymite and cristobalite (both tridymite and cristobalite may be classified as oxide minerals, too), and sekaninaite. Oxide minerals include corundum, hematite, hercynite, magnesioferrite, and magnetite. Some rare minerals typical of meteorites, like oldhamite, are also found in pyrometamorphic rocks.

== Types of pyrometamorphic rocks ==
The main types of pyrometamorphic rocks are:

- Buchite – usually referring to fused, partially melted rock, often formed in expense of sandstone; it may have both glassy and vesicular texture.
- Clinker – it usually refers to fused, not completely melted, shales; typical feature is preservation of the shaly structure.
- Paralava (or parabasalt) – a product of complete melting and (partial) recrystallization

Some thermally changed sedimentary rocks are described under a general name: metapelite.
