= Hatrurim Formation =

Geologic formation in Israel and Jordan

The Hatrurim Formation or Mottled Zone is a geologic formation with outcrops all around the Dead Sea Basin: in the Negev Desert in Israel, in the Judaean Desert on the West Bank, and in western Jordan. It includes late Cretaceous to Eocene aged impure limestone along with coal bearing chalk and marl. The rocks have been subjected to pyrometamorphism resulting from combustion of contained or underlying coal or hydrocarbon deposits. The formation is named for exposures in the Hatrurim Basin which lies west of the Dead Sea.

During the 1960s, a group of scientists from the Hebrew University of Jerusalem, including Yaakov Ben-Tor, and Lisa Heller-Kallai, discovered that the Hatrurim Formation contained several rare, if not unique, mineral assemblages. The formation is the type locality for five unusual minerals and noted for other minerals serving as reference for mineral phases formed at high temperature (1450 °C) in the clinker of Portland cement.

Shulamit Gross, an Israeli geologist and mineralogist, continued to study these rare minerals. In 1977, she published a monograph describing 123 mineral species discovered in the Hatrurim Formation. Five were previously known only from a single locality, and eight others were known only as artificial products of the cement industry. Gross also discovered several minerals completely new to science: bentorite, ye'elimite, and hatrurite. A fourth mineral discovered by Gross was only described later by Dietmar Weber and Adolf Bischoff, which they named grossite after Shulamit.

Gross demonstrated that the unique mineral assemblages discovered in the Hatrurim Formation were formed by pyrometamorphism, and she managed to recreate in the laboratory most of the minerals by heating the precursor sedimentary rocks of the Ghareb and Taqiye formations.

In 2011, a new perovskite-related mineral from the Hatrurim Basin was named shulamitite to honor Shulamit Gross for her works. Shulamitite, ideally Ca_{3}TiFe^{(III)}AlO_{8}, is a mineral intermediate between perovskite (CaTiO_{3}) and brownmillerite (Ca_{2}(Fe,Al)_{2}O_{5}), a mineral of the cement clinker.
