= Larnite =

Calcium silicate mineral

General
- Category: Nesosilicates
- Formula: Ca_{2}SiO_{4}
- IMA symbol: Lrn
- Strunz classification: 9.AD.05
- Crystal system: Monoclinic
- Crystal class: Prismatic (2/m) (same H-M symbol)
- Space group: P2_{1}/n
- Unit cell: a = 5.5, b = 6.74 c = 9.29 [Å]; β = 94.59°; Z = 4

Identification
- Color: White to gray
- Crystal habit: Flattened anhedral grains; massive
- Twinning: Common, polysynthetic parallel to {100}
- Cleavage: Good on {100}, imperfect on {010}
- Mohs scale hardness: 6
- Luster: Vitreous
- Streak: White
- Diaphaneity: Transparent to translucent
- Specific gravity: 3.28–3.33
- Optical properties: Biaxial (+)
- Refractive index: n_{α} = 1.707 n_{β} = 1.715 n_{γ} = 1.730
- Birefringence: δ = 0.023
- 2V angle: 74° calculated
- Dispersion: r > v

Larnite is a calcium silicate mineral with the formula Ca_{2}SiO_{4}. It is the calcium member of the olivine group of minerals.

It was first described from an occurrence at Scawt Hill, Larne, Northern Ireland in 1929 by Cecil Edgar Tilley and named for the location. At the type locality, it occurs with wollastonite, spurrite, perovskite, merwinite, melilite and gehlenite. It occurs in contact metamorphosed limestones and chalks adjacent to basaltic intrusives.

Dicalcium silicate is chemically β–Ca_{2}SiO_{4}, sometimes represented by the idealized oxide formula 2CaO·SiO_{2}. It can also be notated C_{2}S in cement chemist notation. When used in the cement industry, the mineral is usually referred to as belite.
