= Melilite =

Sorosilicate mineral

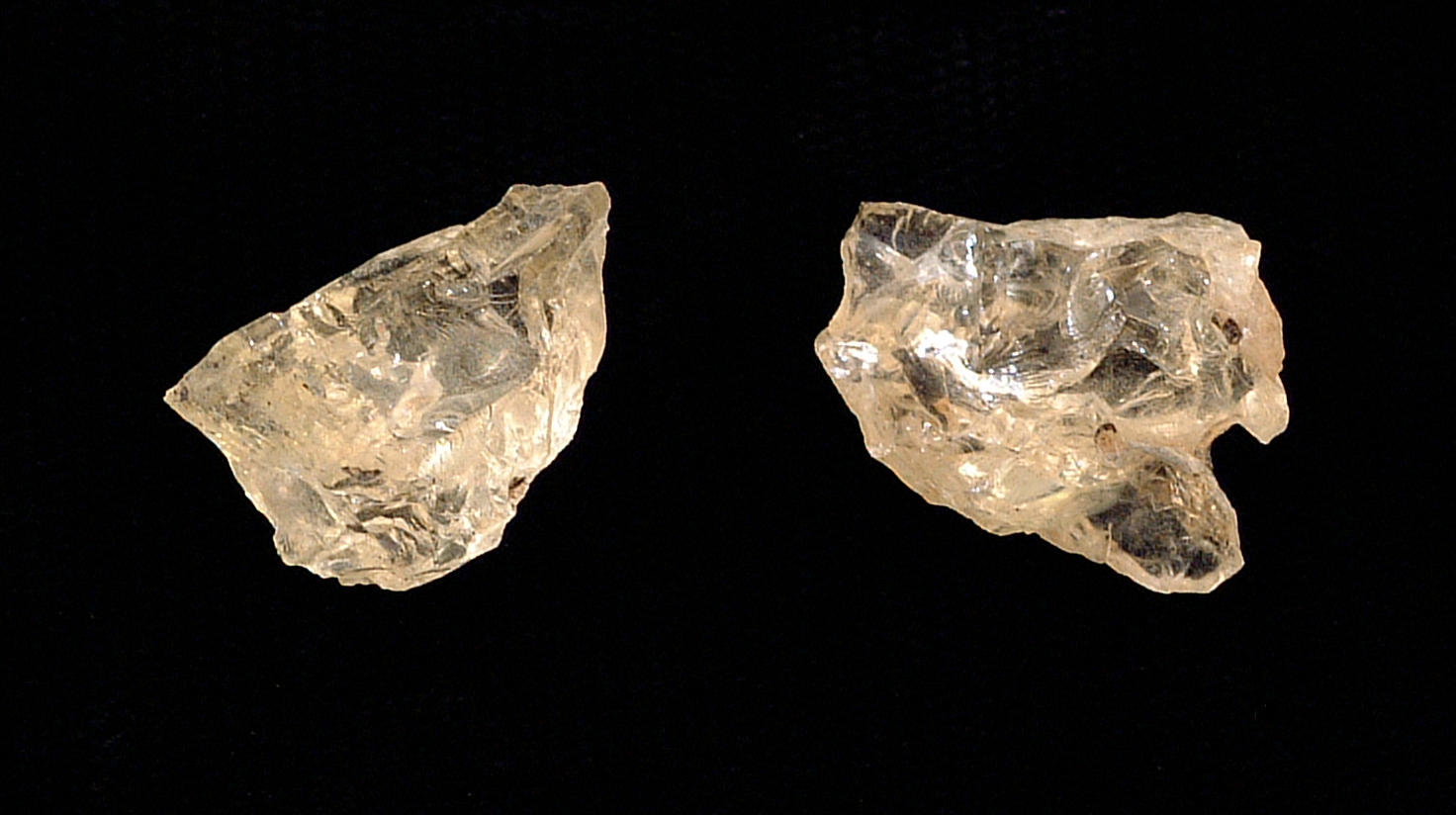
- Melilite – each of the pieces is about 1 cm across

General
- Category: Sorosilicates
- Formula: (Ca,Na)_{2}(Al,Mg,Fe^{2+})[(Al,Si)SiO_{7}]
- Strunz classification: 9.BB.**
- Crystal system: Tetragonal
- Space group: P4̅2_{1}m (no. 113)

Identification
- Color: Yellowish, greenish brown
- Crystal habit: Massive – granular
- Cleavage: Distinct on {001}, weak on {110}
- Fracture: Uneven
- Mohs scale hardness: 5–5.5
- Luster: Vitreous – greasy
- Streak: white
- Diaphaneity: Translucent
- Specific gravity: 2.9–3.0
- Optical properties: Uniaxial (−)
- Refractive index: nω = 1.632 – 1.669 nε = 1.626 – 1.658
- Birefringence: δ = 0.006 – 0.011

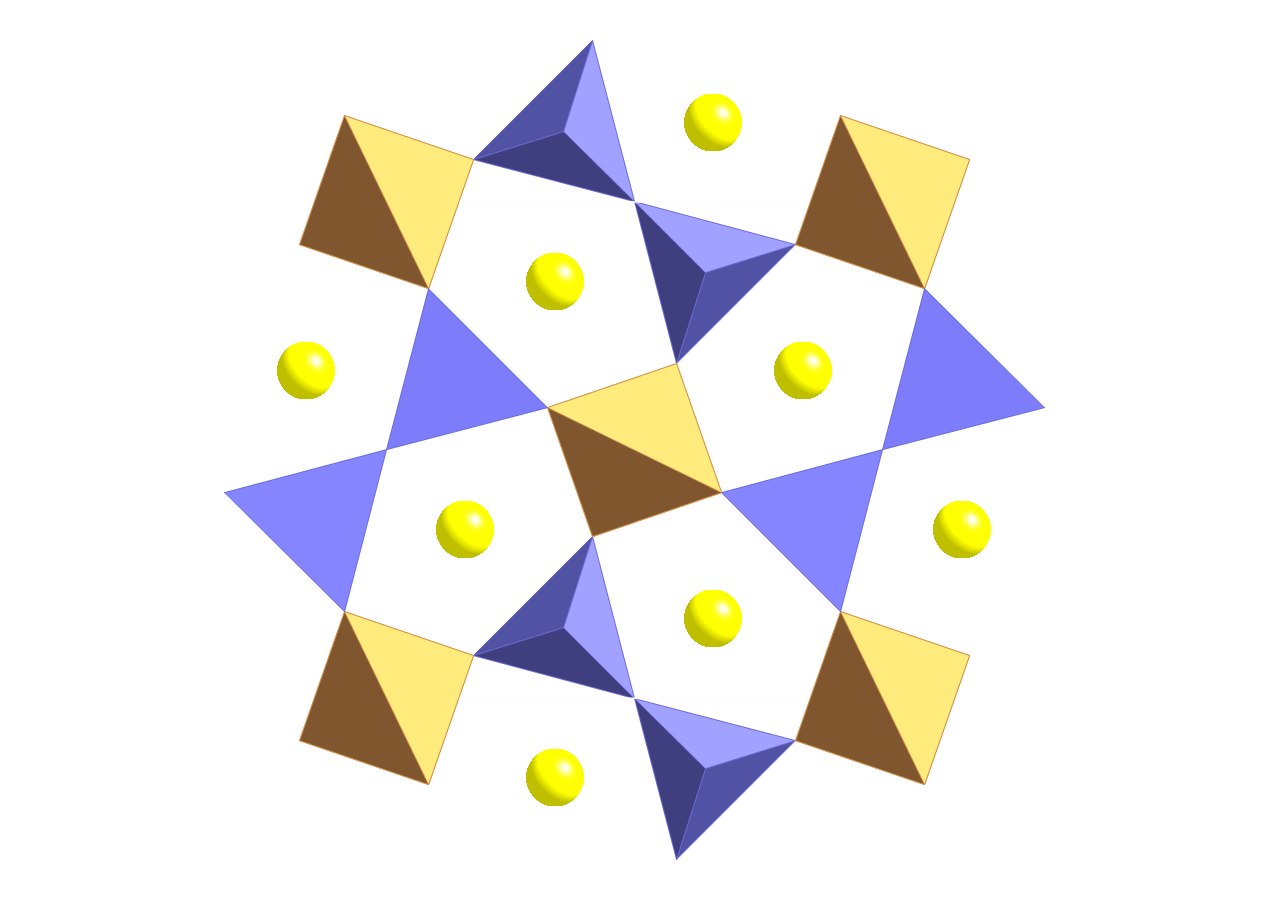
A view down onto the sheets of the A_{2}B(T_{2}O_{7}) melilite structure. The A sites are yellow spheres, the B sites are pale orange tetrahedra, and the T sites are blue tetrahedra. Oxygen atoms (not shown) are on the corners of the tetrahedra.

Crossed polarized light image of melilite in Moiliili lava flow, Moiliili Quarry, Honolulu, O‘ahu, Hawai‘i surrounded by matrix of granular nepheline and volcanic glass. This rock (nepheline-melilite basalt) was erupted during rejuvenated volcanism on O‘ahu.

Melilite refers to a mineral of the melilite group. Minerals of the group are solid solutions of several endmembers, the most important of which are gehlenite and åkermanite. A generalized formula for common melilite is (Ca,Na)_{2}(Al,Mg,Fe^{2+})[(Al,Si)SiO_{7}]. Discovered in 1793 near Rome, it has a yellowish, greenish-brown color. The name derives from the Greek words meli (μέλι) "honey" and lithos (λίθους) "stone".The name refers to a group of minerals (melilite group) with chemically similar composition, nearly always minerals in åkermanite-gehlenite series.

Minerals of the melilite group are sorosilicates. They have the same basic structure, of general formula A_{2}B(T_{2}O_{7}). The melilite structure consist of pairs of fused TO_{4}, where T may be Si, Al, B, in bow-tie form. Sharing one corner, the formula of the pair is T_{2}O_{7}. These bow-ties are linked together into sheets by the B cations. The sheets are held together by the A cations, most commonly calcium and sodium. Aluminium may sit on either the T or the B site.

Minerals with the melilite structure may show a cleavage parallel to the (001) crystallographic directions and may show weaker cleavage perpendicular to this, in the {110} directions. Melilite is tetragonal.

The important endmembers of common melilite are åkermanite Ca_{2}Mg(Si_{2}O_{7}) and gehlenite Ca_{2}Al[AlSiO_{7}]. Many melilites also contain appreciable iron and sodium.

Some other compositions with the melilite structure include: alumoåkermanite (Ca,Na)_{2}(Al,Mg,Fe^{2+})(Si_{2}O_{7}), okayamalite Ca_{2}B[BSiO_{7}], gugiaite Ca_{2}Be[Si_{2}O_{7}], hardystonite Ca_{2}Zn[Si_{2}O_{7}], barylite BaBe_{2}[Si_{2}O_{7}], andremeyerite BaFe_{2}^{+2}[Si_{2}O_{7}]. Some structures formed by replacing one oxygen by F or OH: leucophanite (Ca,Na)_{2}(Be,Al)[Si_{2}O_{6}(F,OH)], jeffreyite (Ca,Na)_{2}(Be,Al)[Si_{2}O_{6}(O,OH)], and meliphanite (Ca,Na)_{2}(Be,Al)[Si_{2}O_{6}(OH,F)].

New members of this mineral group were artificially grown and became intensively studied due to their multiferroic property, i.e., they simultaneously show ferroelectric and magnetic ordering at low temperatures. This gives rise to peculiar optical properties, for example Ba_{2}Co(Ge_{2}O_{7}) shows giant directional dichroism (different absorption for counter-propagating light beams) and hosts magnetically switchable chirality.

== Occurrences ==
Melilite with compositions dominated by the endmembers akermanite and gehlenite is widely distributed but uncommon. It occurs in metamorphic and igneous rocks and in meteorites.

Typical metamorphic occurrences are in high-temperature metamorphosed impure limestones. For instance, melilite occurs in some high-temperature skarns.

Melilite also occurs in unusual silica-undersaturated igneous rocks. Some of these rocks appear to have formed by reaction of magmas with limestone. Other igneous rocks containing melilite crystallize from magma derived from the Earth's mantle and apparently uncontaminated by the Earth's crust. The presence of melilite is an essential constituent in some rare igneous rocks, such as olivine melilitite. Extremely rare igneous rocks contain as much as 70% melilite, together with minerals such as pyroxene and perovskite.

Melilite is a constituent of some calcium–aluminium-rich inclusions in chondritic meteorites. Isotope ratios of magnesium and some other elements in these inclusions are of great importance in deducing processes that formed the Solar System.

Melilitite is a volcanic rock composed of over 90% melilite, with small amounts of olivine, clinopyroxene, and perovskite. The intrusive equivalent is melilitolite. When pyroxene is absent from the rock, and the accessory minerals are olivine, magnetite, leucite, kalsilite, nepheline, and perovskite, the rock is sometimes called katungite. However, more modern classification schemes avoid the term katungite and describe the rock instead as (for example) kalsilite-leucite-olivine melilitite, depending on the most abundant accessory minerals. Alnöite is a melilitite devoid of glass or feldspathoids with melilite in its groundmass.

== See also ==
- Classification of minerals
- List of minerals
