= Spurrite =

Nesosilicate mineral

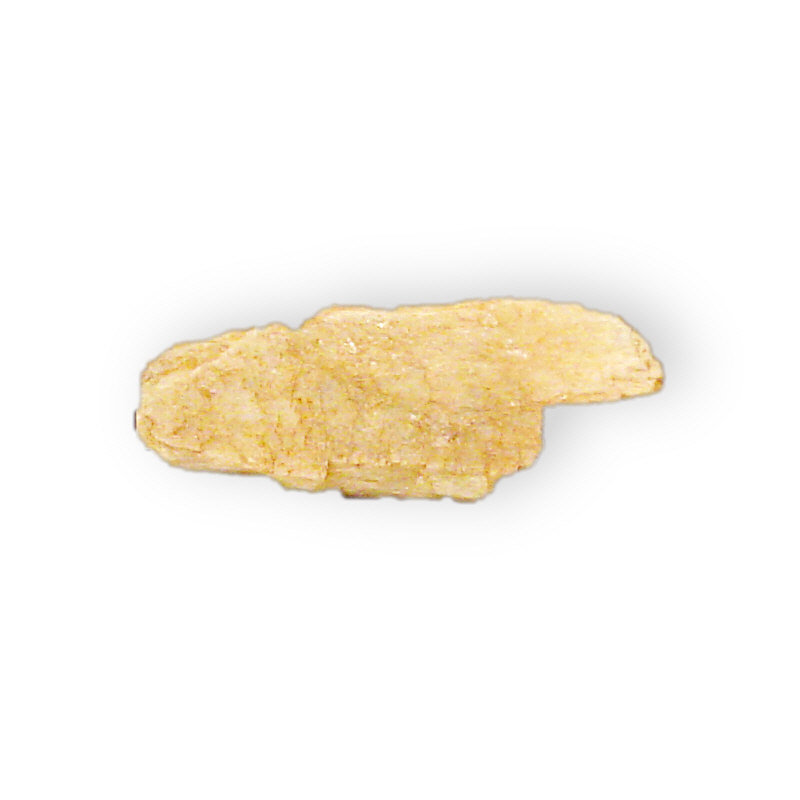
- Spurrite from New Mexico

General
- Category: Nesosilicate
- Formula: Ca_{5}(SiO_{4})_{2}CO_{3}
- IMA symbol: Spu
- Strunz classification: 9.AH.15
- Crystal system: Monoclinic
- Crystal class: Prismatic (2/m) (same H-M symbol)
- Space group: P2_{1}/a

Identification
- Color: Gray, gray white to lilac gray
- Crystal habit: Massive to granular
- Twinning: Polysynthetic twins on [001] and [101]
- Cleavage: Distinct on [100]
- Fracture: Uneven to splintery
- Mohs scale hardness: 5
- Luster: vitreous to resinous
- Streak: White
- Diaphaneity: Transparent to translucent
- Specific gravity: 3
- Optical properties: Biaxial (−)
- Refractive index: nα = 1.640–1.641 nβ = 1.674–1.676 nγ = 1.679–1.681
- Birefringence: δ = 0.039–0.040
- Other characteristics: Green cathodoluminescence

Spurrite is a white, yellow or light blue mineral with monoclinic crystals. Its chemical formula is Ca_{5}(SiO_{4})_{2}CO_{3}.

Spurrite is generally formed in contact metamorphism zones as mafic magmas are intruded into carbonate rocks. Spurrite's space group is P 2/a. It is biaxial with a birefringence of 0.0390–0.0400, giving second order red interference colors when viewed under crossed polarizers in a petrographic microscope.

The calcium is in six-fold coordination with the oxygen, the silicon is in a four-fold coordination with the oxygen and the carbon is in two-fold coordination. One unique characteristic of spurrite is that it actually abides by two twin laws. Polysynthetic twinning can occur along its (001) and another type of twinning can occur parallel to its optical axes.

== Discovery and occurrence ==
Spurrite was first described in 1908 for an occurrence in the Terneras Mine, Velardeña District, Durango, Mexico. It was named for American economic geologist Josiah Edward Spurr (1870–1950).

In addition to its type locality, spurrite has been reported from Riverside County, California; Luna County, New Mexico; and from the Little Belt Mountains, Lewis and Clark County, Montana. It is also found in Ireland, Scotland, New Zealand, Turkey, Israel, Japan and Siberia.

== Cement manufacture contaminant ==
Spurrite forms as contaminating spurrite rings on the walls of cement kilns during the production of Portland cement.
