= Gehlenite =

Sorosilicate mineral

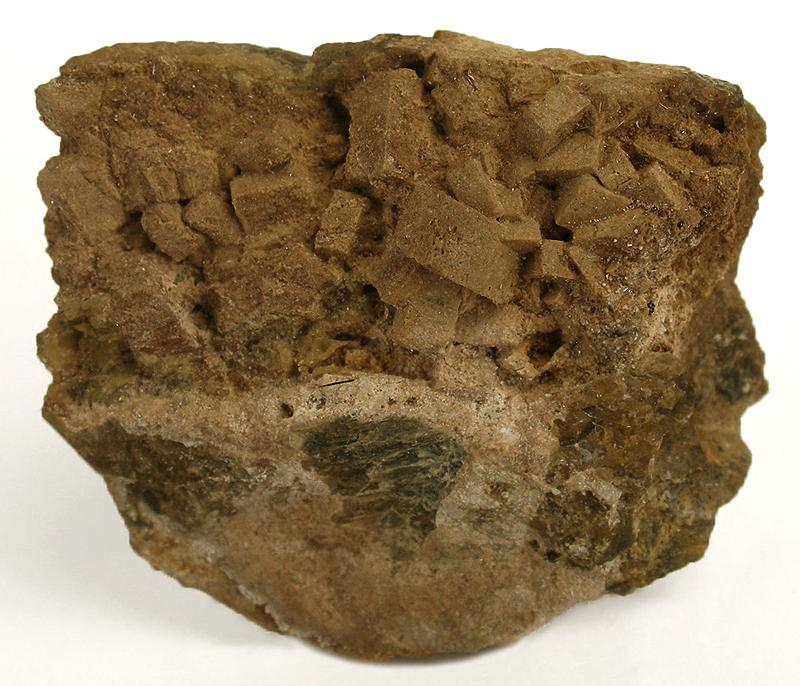

General
- Category: Sorosilicates
- Formula: Ca_{2}Al[AlSiO_{7}]
- IMA symbol: Gh
- Strunz classification: 9.BB.10
- Crystal system: Tetragonal
- Crystal class: Scalenohedral (4̅2m); H-M symbol: (4̅ 2m)
- Space group: P4̅2_{1}m

Identification
- Colour: yellow-brown, green-grey, colourless
- Cleavage: Distinct/good
- Mohs scale hardness: 5–6
- Lustre: vitreous, greasy
- Streak: white, grey-white
- Birefringence: δ = 0.010

Gehlenite, (Ca_{2}Al[AlSiO_{7}]), is a sorosilicate, Al-rich endmember of the melilite complete solid solution series with akermanite. The type locality is in the Monzoni Mountains, Fassa Valley in Trentino in Italy, and is named after the Adolf Ferdinand Gehlen (1775–1815) by A.J. Fuchs in 1815.

== Geological occurrence ==
Gehlenite is found in carbonaceous chondrites from which it condensed as a refractory mineral in the hotter stages (FU Ori) of the presolar nebula, and was subsequently consumed in processes which created enstatite and other more abundant minerals making it a remnant mineral from the early solar nebula (along with corundum and spinel). Its occurrence in the early condensation phase of the solar nebula was predicted by Harry Lord in the 1950s, but studies of carbonaceous chondrites did not support this claim until the Allende meteorite was discovered in 1969. It is also found in diorite intruded carbonate rocks, and to a far lesser extent in uncompahgrites, melilitites, alnoites, lamprophyres and possibly kimberlite pipes.

Gehlenite has also been found on the comet 81P/Wild.

== Crystallography, composition and physical properties ==
Gehlenite is one of five, isostructural tetragonal crystal system minerals in the melilite group. The tetrahedral linkage within the structure is similar to that of an aluminosilicate framework structure and was once considered a feldspathoid-like mineral due to silica undersaturation.

Gehlenite has a Mohs hardness of 5–6, a vitreous to greasy lustre, distinct to good cleavage and is yellow brown, greenish grey or colourless. Its streak is white or grey-white. It is uniaxial (−), has an anomalous nonzero 2V angle and has a characteristic 'ultrablue' birefringence.
