= Worthington, Ontario =

Ghost town in Greater Sudbury, Ontario

Worthington
- Ghost town
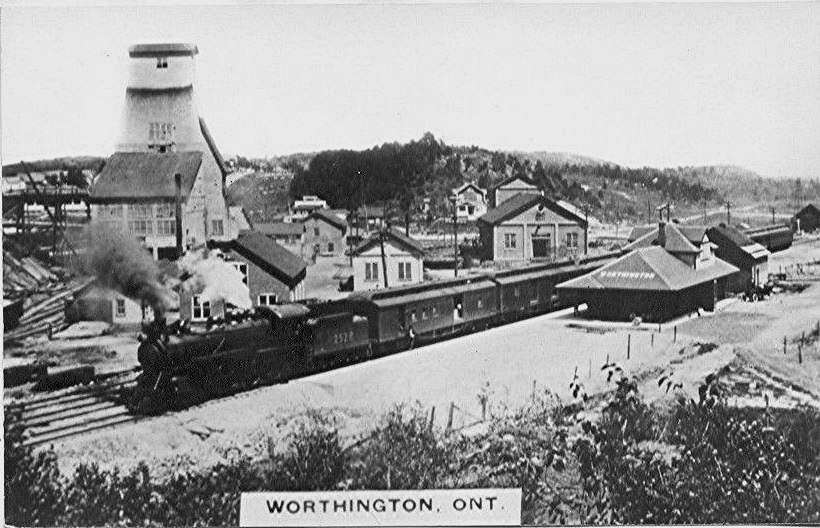
- Worthington in 1920
- Interactive map of Worthington
- Country: Canada
- Province: Ontario
- City: Greater Sudbury
- Ward: 2
- First settled: 1892
- Abandoned: October 4, 1927 (original town)
- Time zone: UTC−05:00 (EST)
  - Summer (DST): UTC−04:00 (EDT)
- Postal Code: P0M 3H0
- Area codes: 705, 249

Worthington is a former mining settlement in Greater Sudbury, Ontario, Canada. It was located near the community of Beaver Lake in the former municipality of Walden. The original settlement once had a population of around 400, but is now a ghost town. None of the original buildings remain.

The community was settled in 1892 by employees of the mine. The original town was located near the current Totten Mine, south of Fairbank Lake Road. In 1927, the mine collapsed, partially damaging the town. The mine permanently closed shortly after, and the original townsite was abandoned. Worthington continues to exist as a postal designation.

== History ==
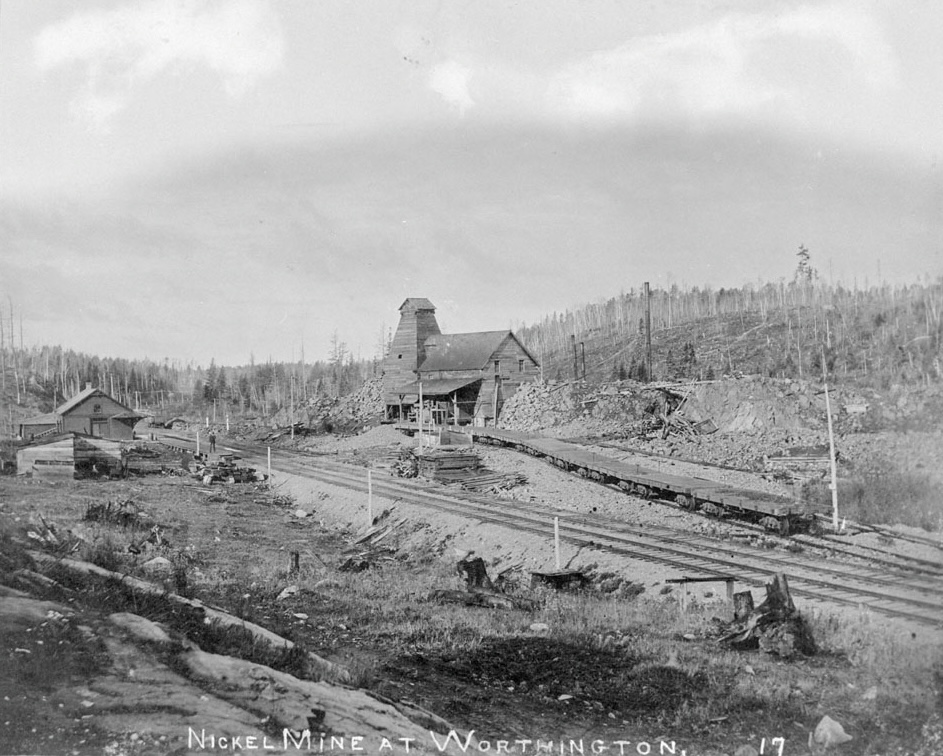
Worthington Mine in 1900

Worthington was named for James Worthington, a Canadian Pacific superintendent and shareholder of the Dominion Mineral Company, which acquired the mine in 1890. He was also known for naming the nearby settlement of Sudbury after the birthplace of his wife, Caroline Hitchcock.

The Mine itself was originally called the Crean Mine and was one of the oldest mines in the Sudbury area. Prospector Francis Charles Crean applied to acquire the land on June 14, 1884, and received a grant from the Department of Crown Lands that November. In the spring of 1885, a shaft was sunk to a depth of 60 feet (18 m). As only a small quantity of ore was discovered, the mine was abandoned.

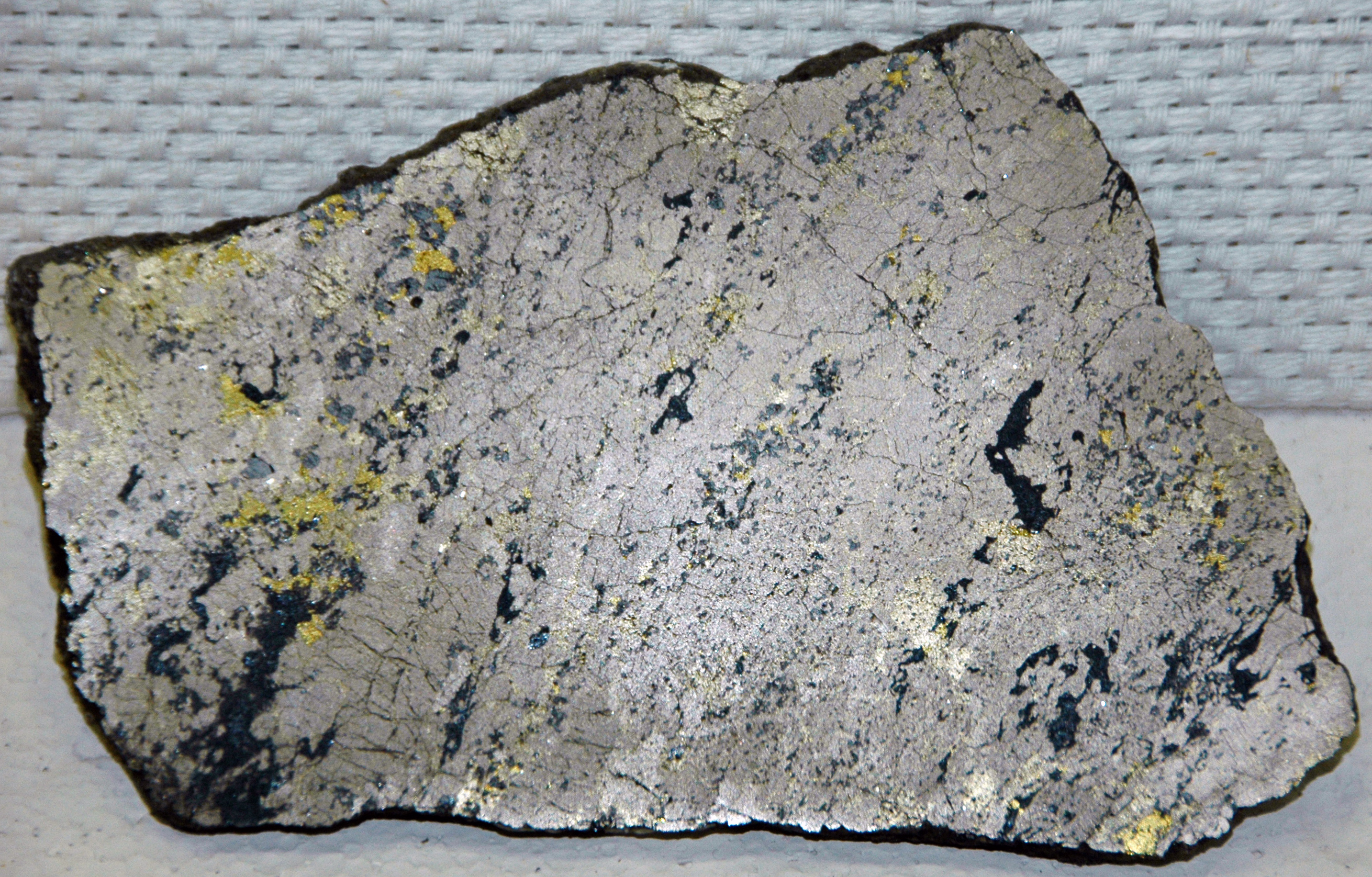
Ore sample from Worthington Mine

The Dominion Mineral Company acquired the mine in 1890. Mining operations were suspended in 1894, with 25,000 tons of ore extracted. In 1892 the settlement had thirty five dwellings, a company store, post office and railway station, with a hotel and social hall being constructed by 1910.

The Mond Nickel Company purchased the mine in 1910 after the suspension of its operations at Victoria Mines, and a third shaft was added at a depth of 200 feet (61 m). In 1918, the third shaft was deepened to 750 feet (230 m), with the ore zones in the mine expanded using the shrinking stoping method. After the purchase, several workers’ cottages were constructed and the population of the settlement reached a peak of around four to five hundred residents by 1927.

By 1927, the mine had shipped 129,000 tons of ore, with its output largely being sold to the Canadian Pacific Railway to be used as track ballast. Samples from the mine contain a mix of minerals, including sulfides like gersdorffite, chalcopyrite, pyrrhotite, pentlandite, and molybdenite, along with the arsenide niccolite.

== 1927 mine collapse ==
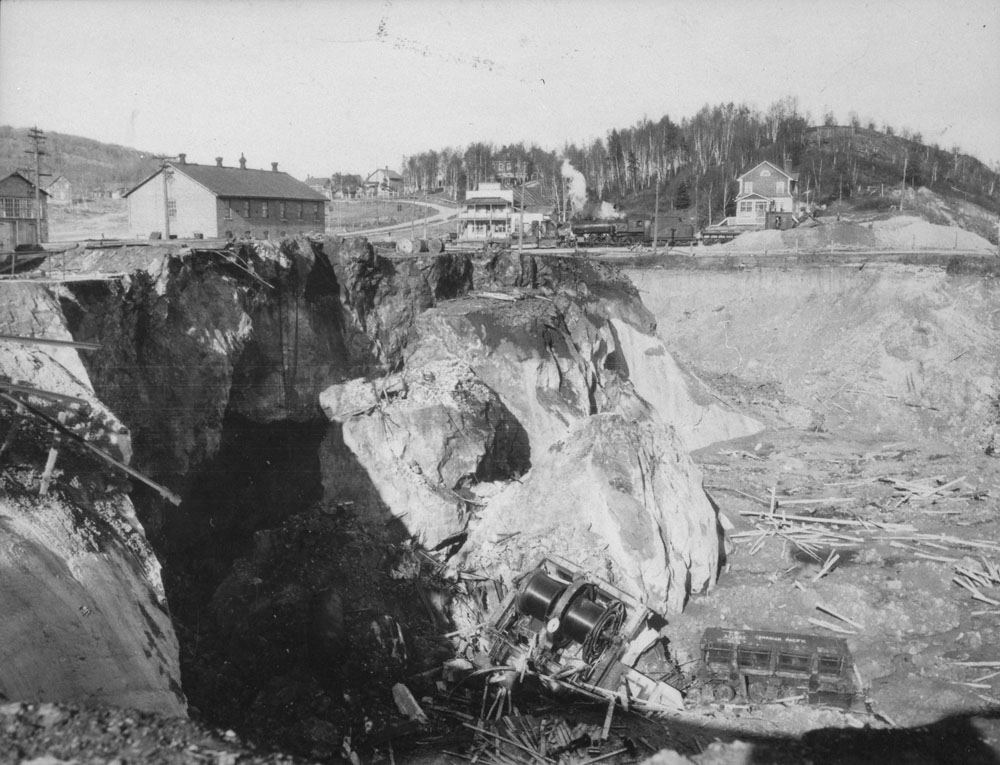
Worthington after the collapse

At around 7:00 pm on October 3, 1927, shift boss D. Ballantyne descended to the third level of the mine at a depth of 400 feet (120 m). There, he observed the movement and sounds of abnormal rock shifts within the shaft pillar, which were extending outward to the main shaft openings.

Ballantyne informed mine superintendent William Mumford about his observations, and Mumford descended into the mine to examine the situation. Mumford ordered the weak spot on the third level to be reinforced with additional timbers so the fifty miners on the day shift could be safely evacuated.

With the timbers installed, the miners were evacuated by around 10:00 pm. By 10:30 pm, the shifting of rock on the third level had accelerated to the extent that Mumford observed that the floor east of the shaft had been forced upward by approximately 3 feet (91 cm). At this point Mumford himself evacuated the mine, with no other miners allowed underground afterwards.

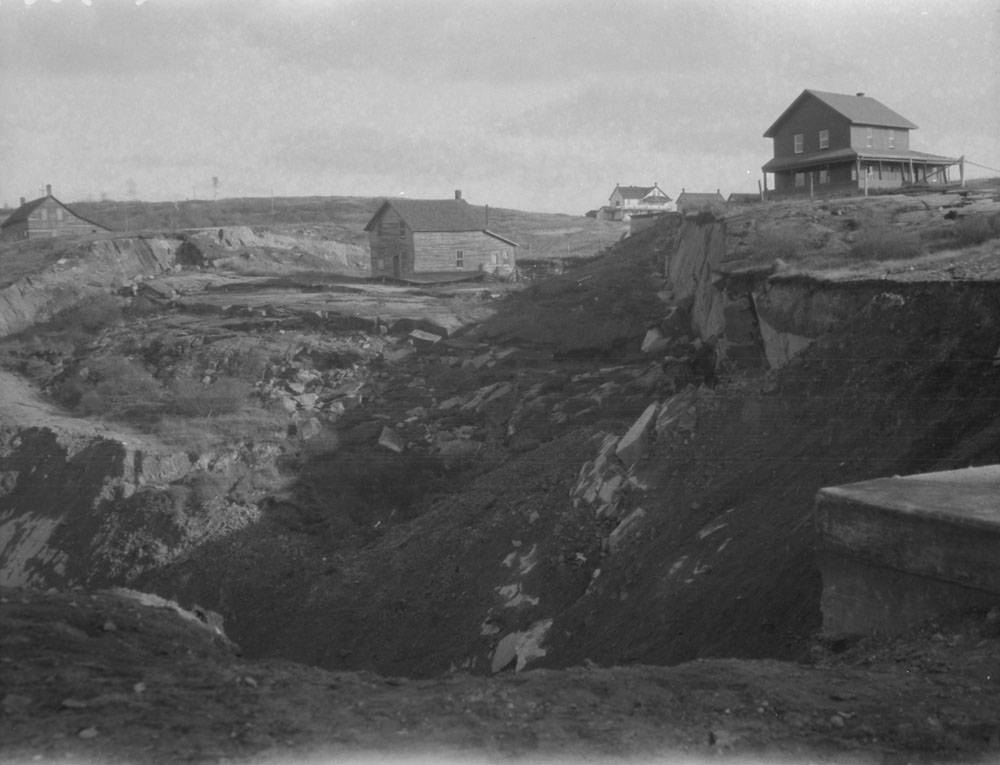
Houses in Worthington after the collapse

The following morning at 5:50 am, the entire underground portion of the mine collapsed down to its fifth level at a depth of 750 feet (230 m). Approximately 810,000 cubic feet (23,000 m^{3}) of rock as well as 7,020,000 cubic feet (199,000 m^{3}) of clay and sand subsided into the collapsed mine, creating a 171,500 square feet (15,930 m^{2}) crater on the surface. Above the collapse, the mines power house, a miners residence, and 500 feet (150 m) of Canadian Pacific track, along with two gondola cars, fell into the crater.

Frank Stos and his two sons, along with Frank Pisoskowski, his wife and their baby, were inside the home that fell approximately 30 feet (9.1 m) feet into the crater. Although the house did not collapse when it fell into the crater, Mrs. Pisoskowski was bruised when a table overturned and struck her. The only other injury was to one of the Stos’ pigs, which broke a leg when it fell into the crater along with the houses backyard.

=== Investigation ===
Above the fifth level of the mine, the shaft pillar had shown signs of weakening for several years, and the area had received heavy rainfall in the weeks prior to the collapse. It was proposed that the rain accumulation had weighed down the supporting pillars of the mine, which lubricated a previously undiscovered geological fault and shifted the surface load to the mines structural supports.

== Aftermath ==
The Canadian Pacific station, although not destroyed, was abandoned due to the crater being within a few yards of the building, with the last train passing through the town two hours before the collapse. The home of another family sat still standing at the craters edge. Due to the evacuation of the mine, no casualties occurred, and the sight of the collapsed mine attracted sightseers from around the region.

A temporary diversion for the destroyed section of the Canadian Pacific track was also destroyed following another collapse on October 19th, caused by continued rainfall. The track was reopened on the 22nd. The track was later rebuilt to the south of the crater, and a section of road that sat within a few feet of the crater was rebuilt to the north. The flooded mineshaft was capped in 2005.

After the collapse, the destroyed mine was formally abandoned on October 4th. Salvaging work at the mine removed much of the equipment from the collapsed power station, which was moved to Monds other operations. C.V. Corless, managing director of Mond Nickel, indicated that the company was already planning to abandon the mine and transfer many of the 170 employees to its other operations prior to the collapse of the mine. A number of the employees were later moved to Garson, Levack, and Frood mines.

== Abandonment ==
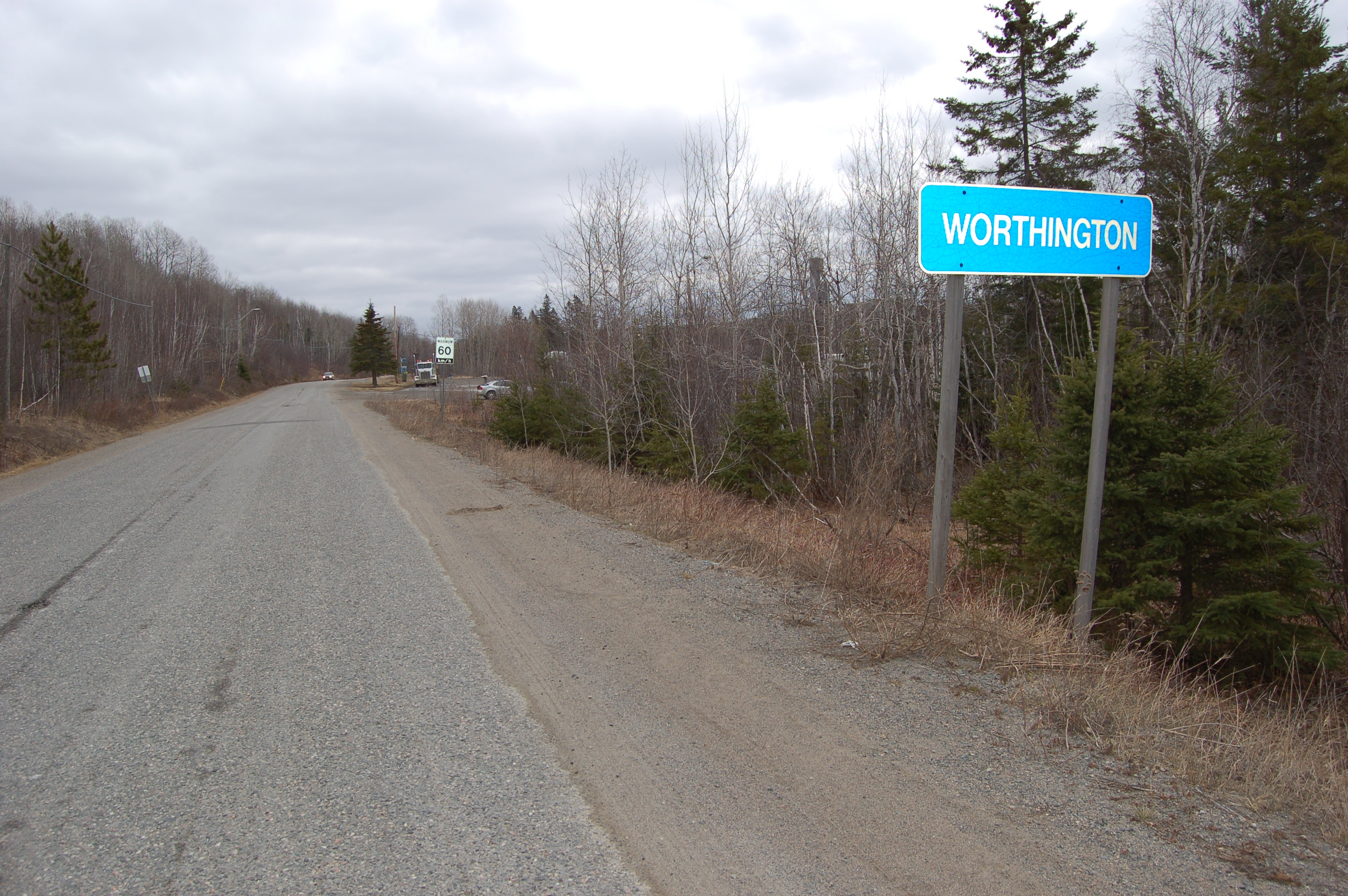
Worthington in 2007

With the collapse and subsequent abandonment of the mine, the surviving portion of the original town-site was also abandoned due to its proximity to the crater. The few remaining residents then established a new town-site along the rebuilt highway to the north, primarily functioning as a highway outpost.

Activity briefly returned to the town with the reopening of the nearby Kidd-Copper mine in 1955 and Totten Mine in 1964. The return of mining activity was short lived, with Kidd-Copper closing and reopening twice throughout the 1950s and 1960s, and the closure of Totten Mine in 1972.

The following year, the township containing Worthington was amalgamated into the newly formed lower-tier Town of Walden within the Regional Municipality of Sudbury. The highway through Worthington was then downgraded to the regional government, with Ontario Highway 17 being moved further to the south. With the downgrading of the highway, most of the remaining residents left. Although Worthington continues to have its own postal code, it no longer has its own post office.

== See also ==
- List of ghost towns in Ontario
- Walden, Ontario
