= Pentlandite =

Iron–nickel sulfide

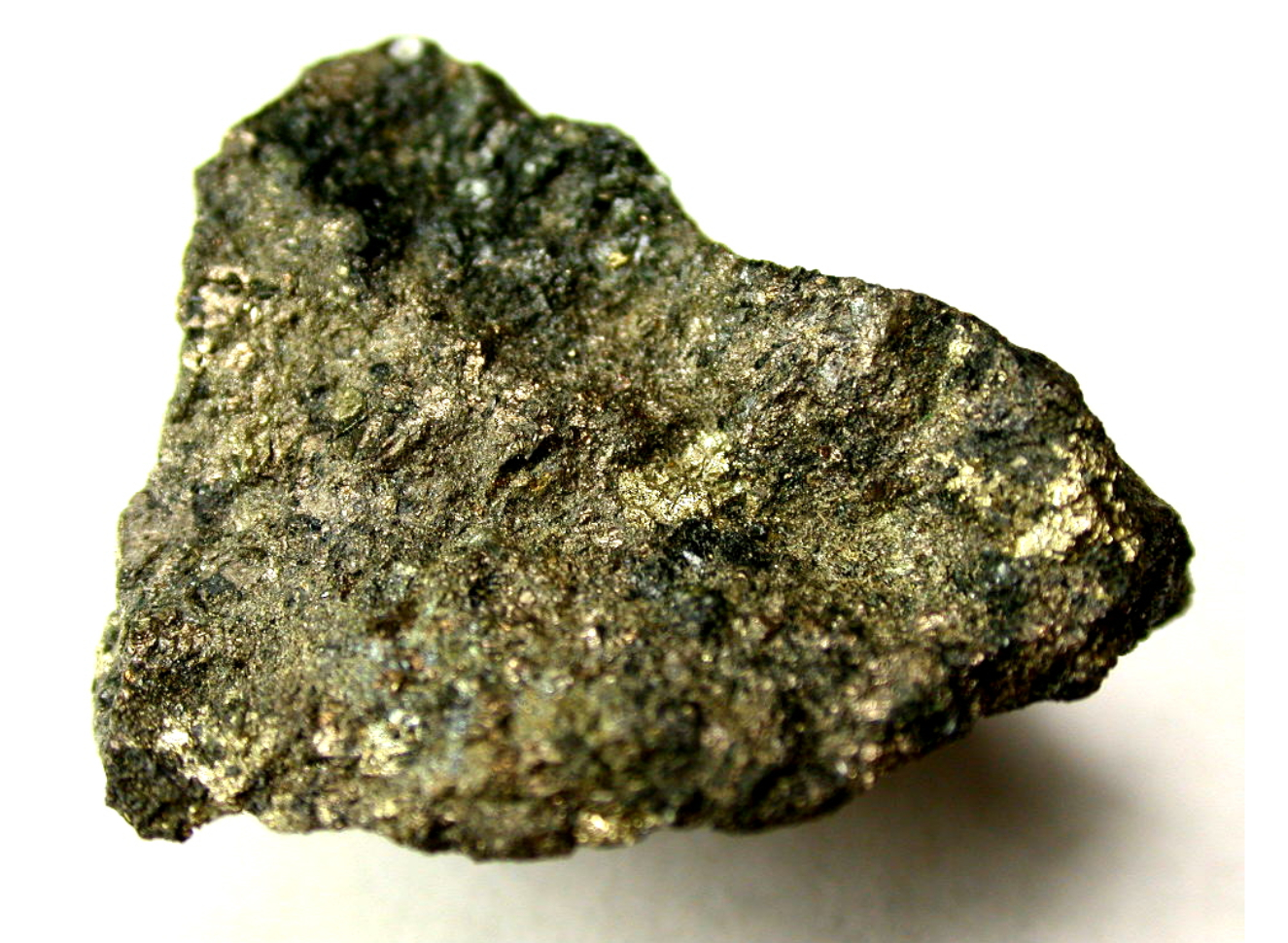
- 3.1 × 2.6 cm mass of pentlandite with some pyrrhotite

General
- Category: Sulfide mineral
- Formula: iron nickel sulfide: (Fe,Ni)_{9}S_{8}
- IMA symbol: Pn
- Strunz classification: 2.BB.15a
- Dana classification: 2.7.1.1
- Crystal system: Isometric
- Crystal class: Hexoctahedral (m3̅m); H-M symbol: (4/m 3̅ 2/m)
- Space group: Fm3̅m
- Unit cell: a = 9.928 Å, Z = 4

Identification
- Formula mass: 771.94 g/mol
- Color: Yellowish bronze
- Crystal habit: Hexoctahedral rare; massive to granular
- Cleavage: Absent – octahedral parting on {111}
- Fracture: Conchoidal
- Tenacity: Brittle
- Mohs scale hardness: 3.5–4
- Luster: Metallic
- Streak: Light bronze-brown Greenish black
- Diaphaneity: Opaque
- Specific gravity: 4.6–5.0
- Density: 4.6–5 g/cm^{3}
- Fusibility: 1.5–2
- Other characteristics: Becomes magnetic upon heating

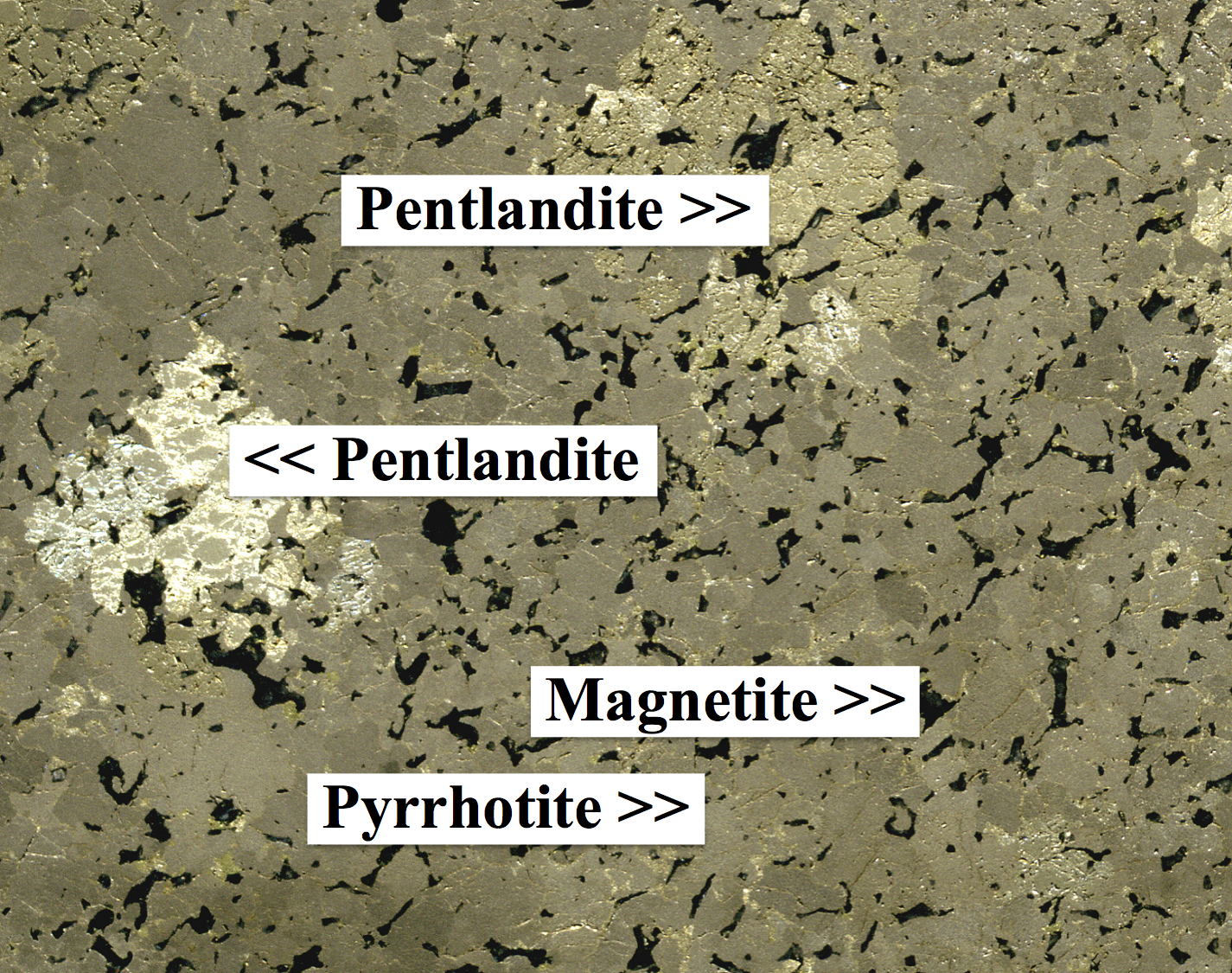
Pentlandite in pyrrhotite, ore specimen from the Sudbury Basin (field of view 3.4 cm)

Pentlandite is an iron–nickel sulfide with the chemical formula (Fe,Ni)_{9}S_{8}. Pentlandite has a narrow variation range in nickel to iron ratios (Ni:Fe), but it is usually described as 1:1. In some cases, this ratio is skewed by the presence of pyrrhotite inclusions. It also contains minor cobalt, usually at low levels as a fraction of weight.

Pentlandite forms isometric crystals, but it is normally found in massive granular aggregates. It is brittle with a hardness of 3.5–4 and specific gravity of 4.6–5.0 and is non-magnetic. It has a yellowish bronze color and a metallic luster.

Pentlandite is found in abundance within ultramafic rocks, making it one of the most important sources of mined nickel. It also occasionally occurs within mantle xenoliths and "black smoker" hydrothermal vents.

== Etymology ==
It is named after Irish scientist Joseph Barclay Pentland (1797–1873), who first noted the mineral at Sudbury, Ontario.

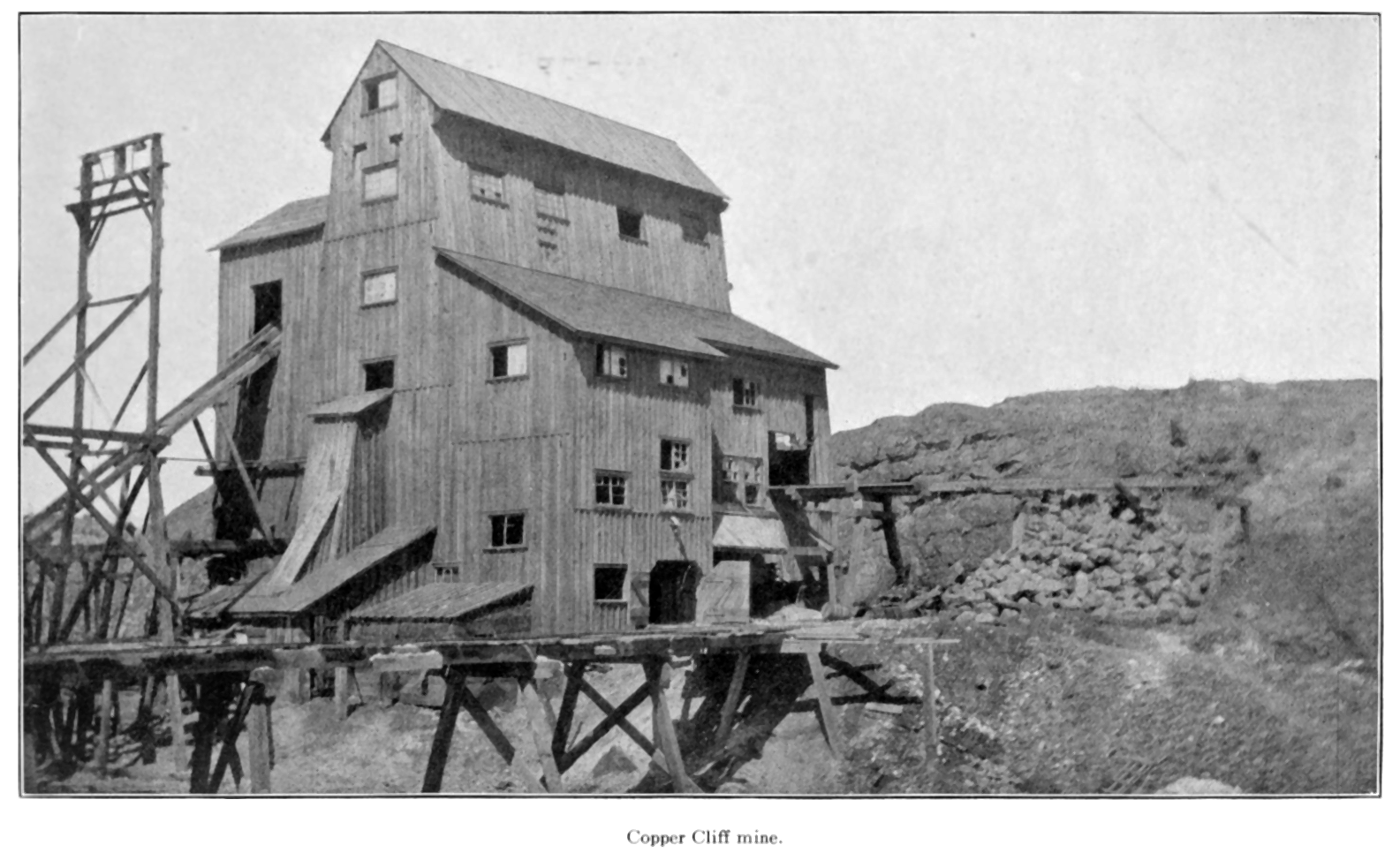
Copper Cliff mine, Sudbury, Ontario (1913)

== Identification ==
=== Physical and optical properties ===
In the field, pentlandite is often confused with other sulfide minerals, as they are all brassy yellowish in color and have a metallic luster. For this reason, the best way to discern pentlandite is by its paler color, lack of magnetism, and light brownish bronze streak. In contrast, pyrite, pyrrhotite and chalcopyrite will all display much darker streaks: brownish black, greyish black, greenish black respectively. When looked at using reflected light ore microscopy, it possesses key diagnostic properties such as octahedral cleavage, and its alteration to bravoite, a pinkish to brownish violet sulfide mineral that occurs in euhedral to octahedral crystals. Pentlandite usually develops as granular inclusions within other sulfide minerals (mainly pyrrhotite), often taking the shape of thin veins or "flames". Although pentlandite is an opaque mineral, it exhibits a strong light creamy reflectance.

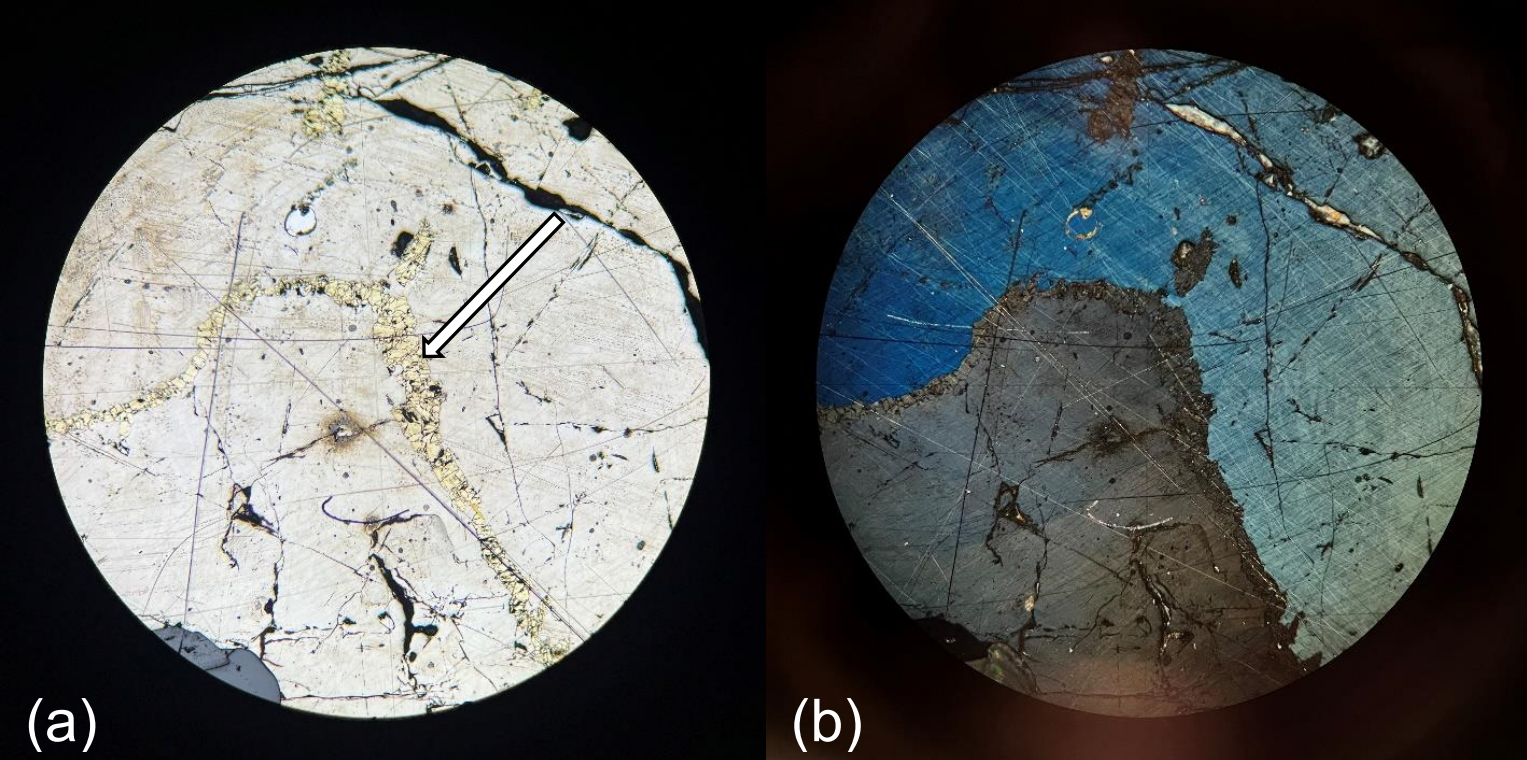
Photomicrograph showing flame-like pentlandite intergrowth in plane polarized light (PPL) (a) and cross polarized light (XPL) (b) (5x magnification, FOV = 4 mm)

=== Mineral associations ===
Pentlandite occurs alongside sulfide minerals such as bravoite, chalcopyrite, cubanite, millerite, pyrrhotite, valleriite, as well as other minerals like chromite, ilmenite, magnetite, and sperrylite. It is chemically similar to mackinawite, godlevskite and horomanite.

Pentlandite is synonymous with folgerite, horbachite, lillhammerite, and nicopyrite.

== Pentlandite group ==
The pentlandite group is a subdivision of rare minerals that share similar chemical and structural properties with pentlandite, hence the name. Their chemical formula can be written as XY_{8}(S, Se)_{8} in which X is usually replaced by silver, manganese, cadmium, and lead, while copper takes the place of Y. Iron, nickel, and cobalt have the ability to occupy both X or Y positions. These minerals are:

- Argentopentlandite Ag(Fe,Ni)_{8}S_{8}
- Cobalt pentlandite Co_{9}S_{8}
- Geffroyite (Ag,Cu,Fe)_{9}(Se,S)_{8}
- Manganese-shadlunite (Mn,Pb)(Cu,Fe)_{8}S_{8}
- Shadlunite (Pb,Cd)(Fe,Cu)_{8}S_{8}
- Oberthürite Rh_{3}Ni_{32}S_{32}
- Sugakiite Cu(Fe,Ni)_{8}S_{8}

== Paragenesis ==
Pentlandite is the most common terrestrial nickel sulfide. It typically forms during cooling of a sulfide melt. These sulfide melts, in turn, are typically formed during the evolution of a silicate melt. Because nickel is a chalcophile element, it has preference for (i.e. it "partitions into") sulfide phases. In sulfide undersaturated melts, nickel substitutes for other transition metals within ferromagnesian minerals, the most common being olivine, as well as nickeliferous varieties of amphibole, biotite, pyroxene and spinel. Nickel substitutes most readily for Fe^{2+} and Co^{2+} because or their similarity in size and charge.

In sulfide saturated melts, nickel behaves as a chalcophile element and partitions strongly into the sulfide phase. Because most nickel behaves as a compatible element in igneous differentiation processes, the formation of nickel-bearing sulfides is essentially restricted to sulfide saturated mafic and ultramafic melts. Minor amounts of nickel sulfides are found in mantle peridotites.

The behaviour of sulfide melts is complex and is affected by copper, nickel, iron, and sulfur ratios. Typically, above 1100 °C, only one sulfide melt exists. Upon cooling to 1000 °C, a solid containing mostly Fe and minor amounts of Ni and Cu is formed. This phase is called monosulfide solid solution (MSS), and is unstable at low temperatures decomposing to mixtures of pentlandite and pyrrhotite, and (rarely) pyrite. It is only upon cooling past ~550 °C (1,022 °F) (dependent on composition) that the MSS undergoes exsolution. A separate phase, usually a copper-rich sulfide liquid may also form, giving rise to chalcopyrite upon cooling.

These phases typically form aphanitic equigranular massive sulfides, or are present as disseminated sulfides within rocks composed mostly of silicates. Pristine magmatic massive sulfide are rarely preserved as most deposits of nickeliferous sulfide have been metamorphosed.

Metamorphism at a grade equal to, or higher than, greenschist facies will cause solid massive sulfides to deform in a ductile fashion and to travel some distance into the country rock and along structures. Upon cessation of metamorphism, the sulfides may inherit a foliated or sheared texture, and typically develop bright, equigranular to globular aggregates of porphyroblastic pentlandite crystals known colloquially as "fish scales".

Metamorphism may also alter the concentration of nickel and the Ni:Fe ratio and Ni:S ratio of the sulfides. In this case, pentlandite may be replaced by millerite, and rarely heazlewoodite. Metamorphism may also be associated with metasomatism, and it is particularly common for arsenic to react with pre-existing sulfides, producing nickeline, gersdorffite and other Ni–Co arsenides.

== Occurrence ==
Pentlandite is found within the lower margins of mineralized layered intrusions, the best examples being the Bushveld igneous complex, South Africa, the Voisey's Bay troctolite intrusive complex in Canada, the Duluth gabbro, in North America, and various other localities throughout the world. In these locations, pentlandite is considered an important nickel ore.

Pentlandite is also the dominant ore mineral occurring in Kambalda type komatiitic nickel ore deposits, the prime example of which can be found in the Yilgarn craton of Western Australia. Similar deposits exist at Nkomati, Namibia, in the Thompson Belt, Canada, and a few examples from Brazil.

Pentlandite, but primarily chalcopyrite and PGEs, are also obtained from the supergiant Norilsk nickel deposit, in trans-Siberian Russia.

The Sudbury Basin in Ontario, Canada, is associated with a large meteorite impact crater. The pentlandite-chalcopyrite-pyrrhotite ore around the Sudbury Structure formed from sulfide melts that segregated from the melt sheet produced by the impact.

== Gallery ==
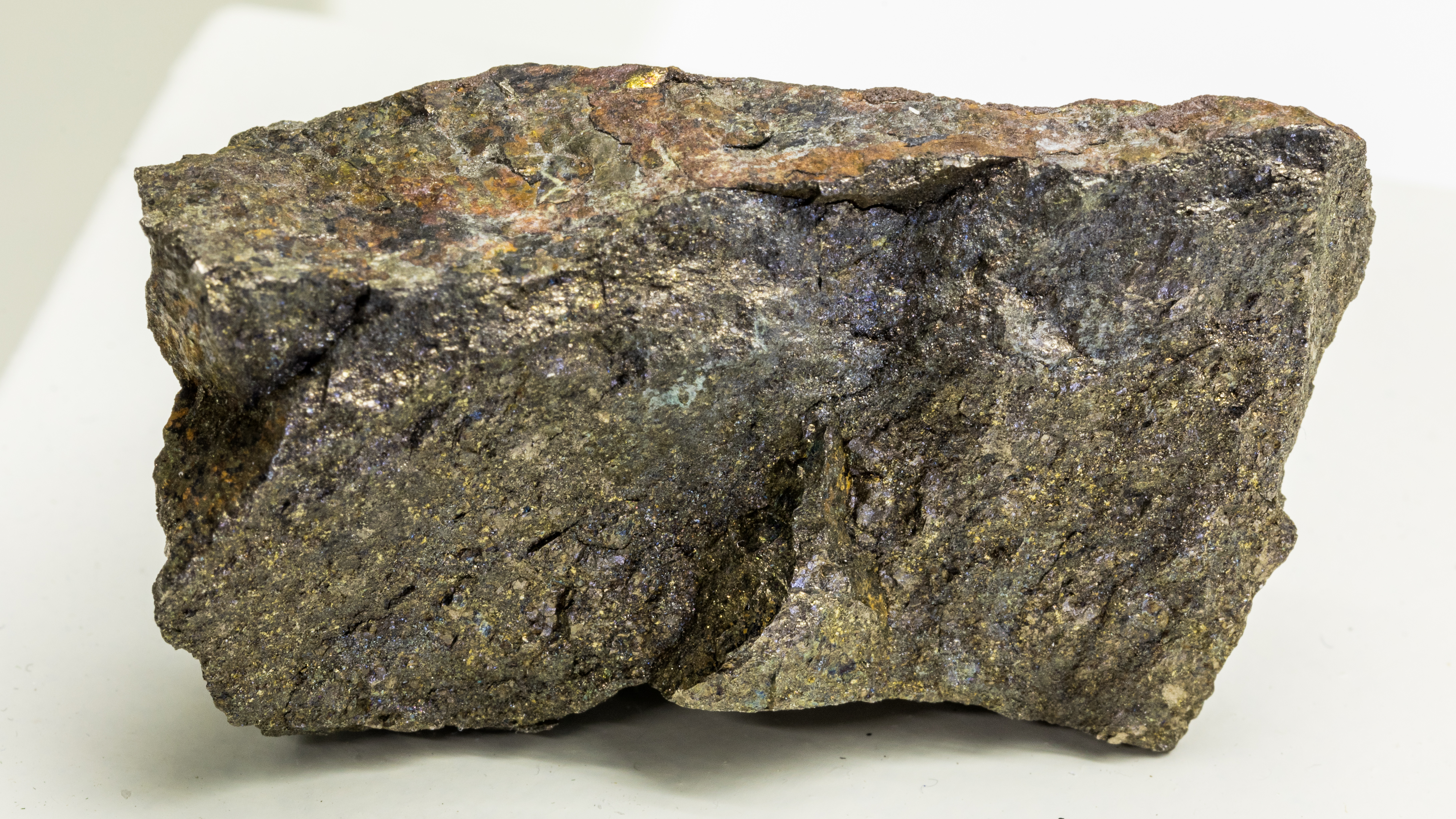
Pentlandite specimen from Sudbury, Ontario, Canada

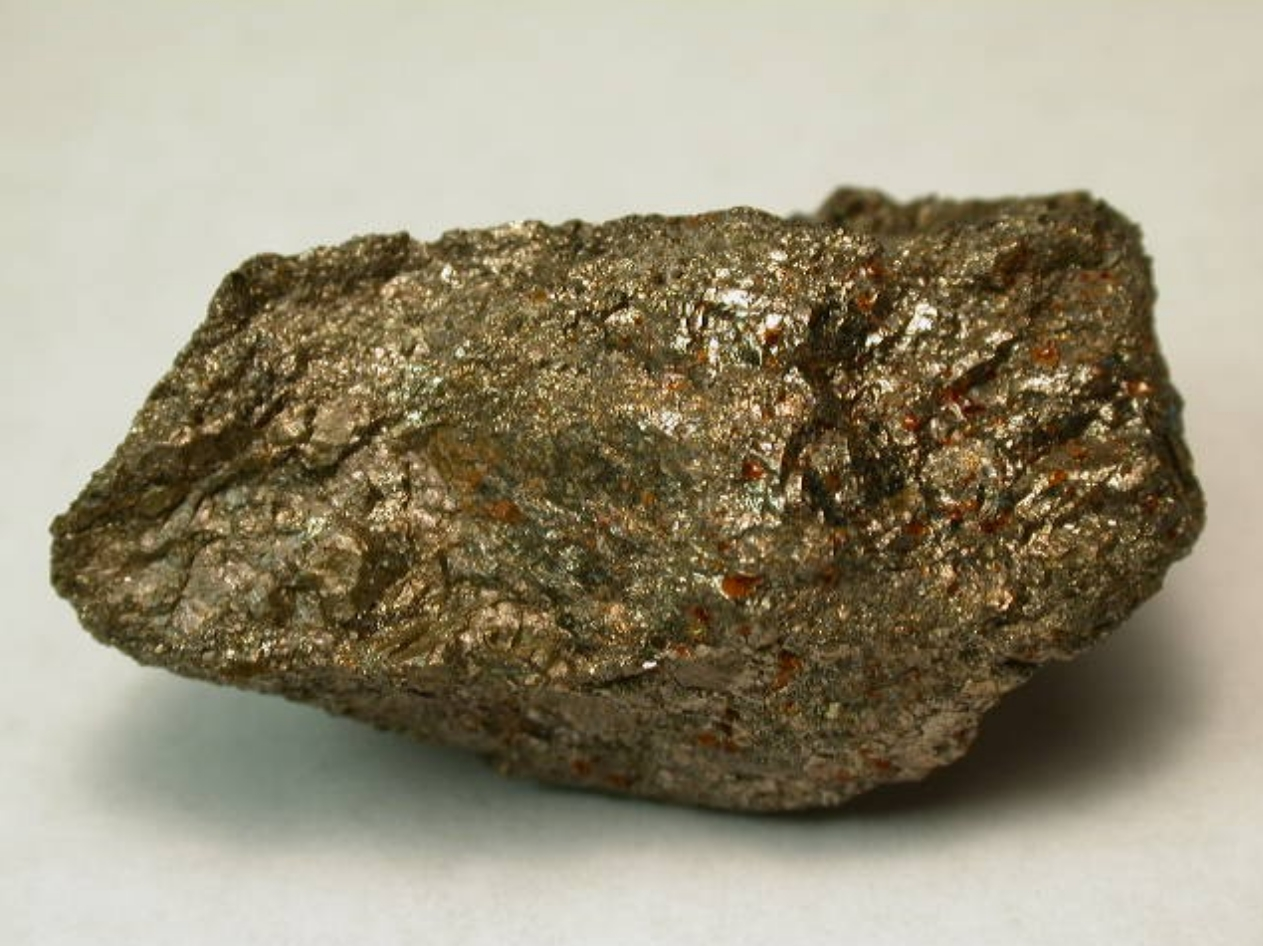
Pentlandite specimen from Kambalda, Western Australia

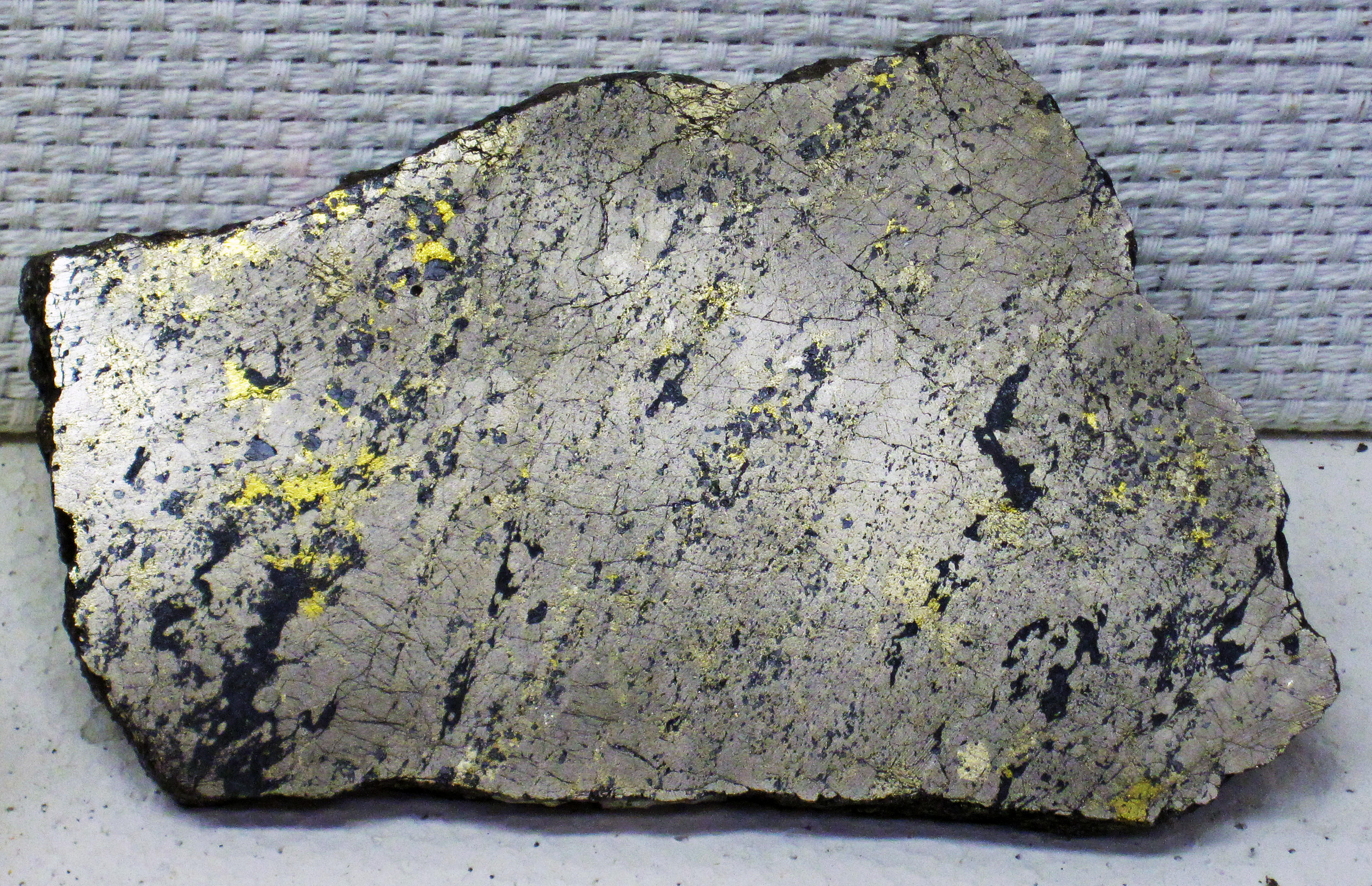
Pentlandite occurring with pyrrhotite, chalcopyrite, and magnetite. Specimen from Sudbury, Ontario, Canada

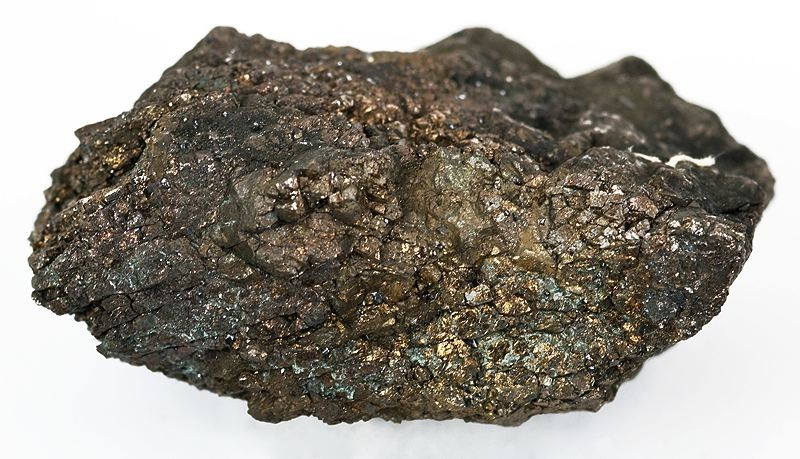
Pentlandite occurring with chalcopyrite and pyrrhotite. Specimen from Sudbury, Ontario, Canada

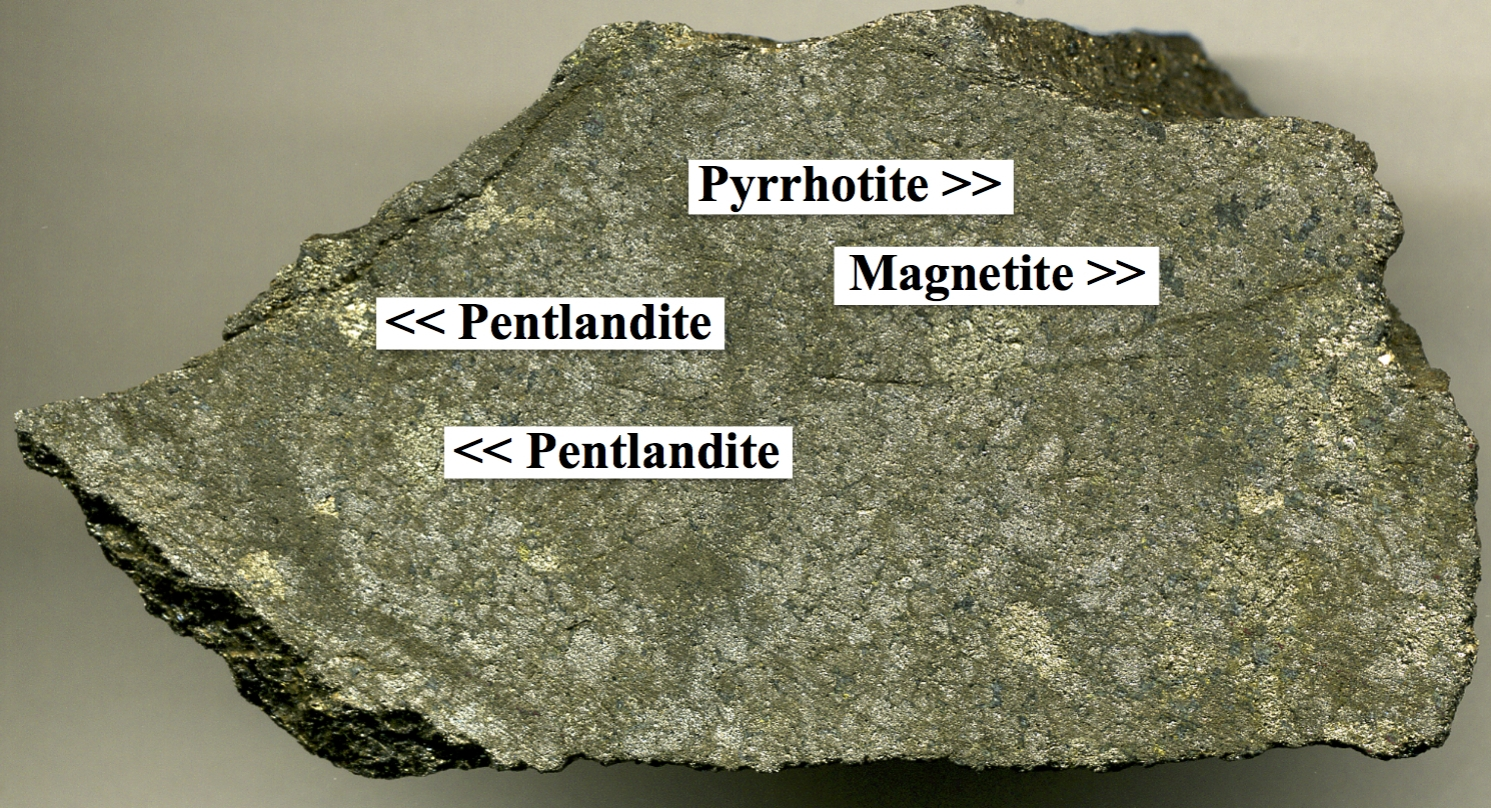
Pentlandite occurring with pyrrhotite and magnetite. Specimen from Sudbury, Ontario, Canada

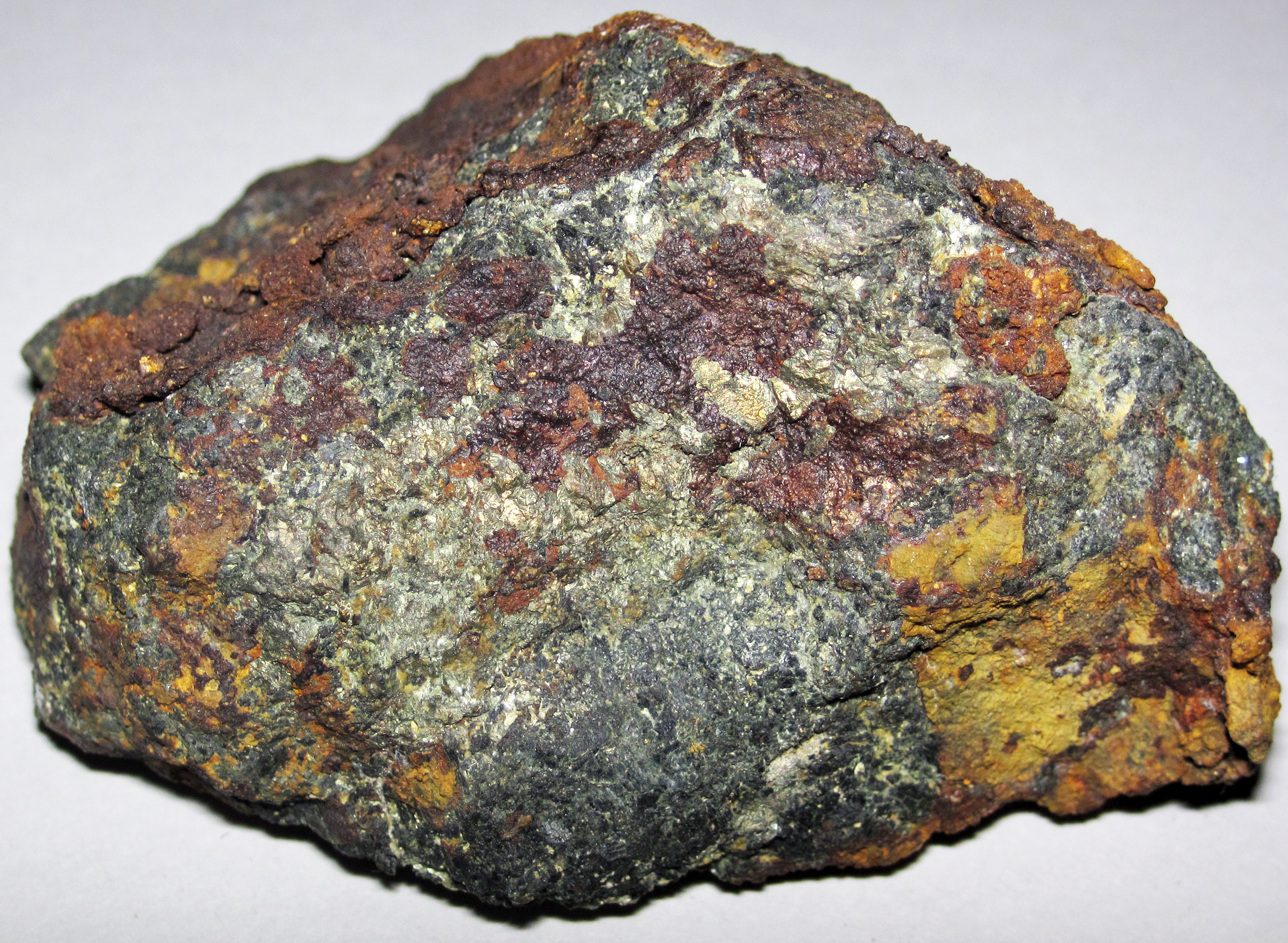
Pentlandite occurring with pyrrhotite and chalcopyrite. Specimen from Gap Nickel Mine, Pennsylvania, USA

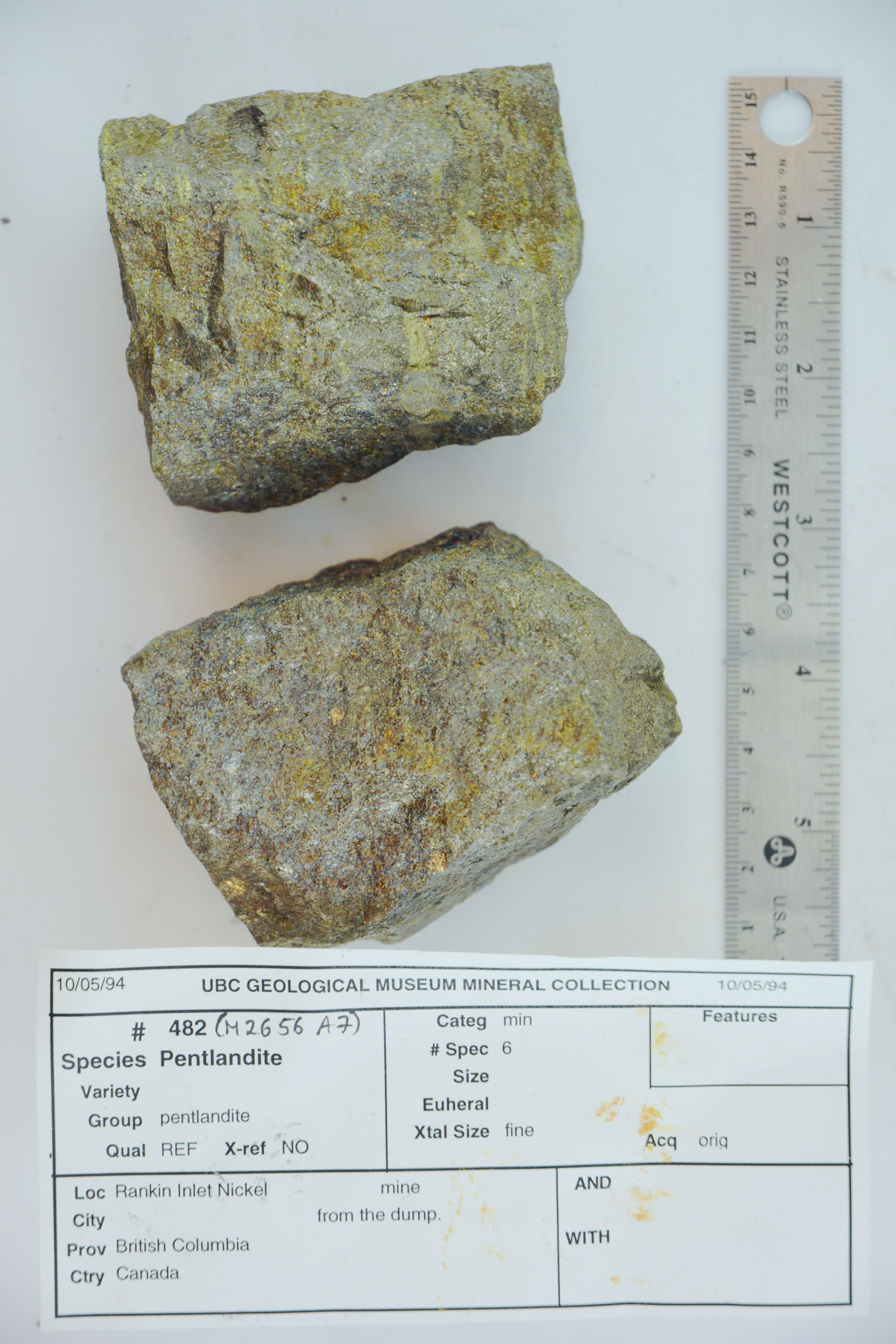
Pentlandite from Rankin Inlet Nickel Mine, Nunavut, Canada

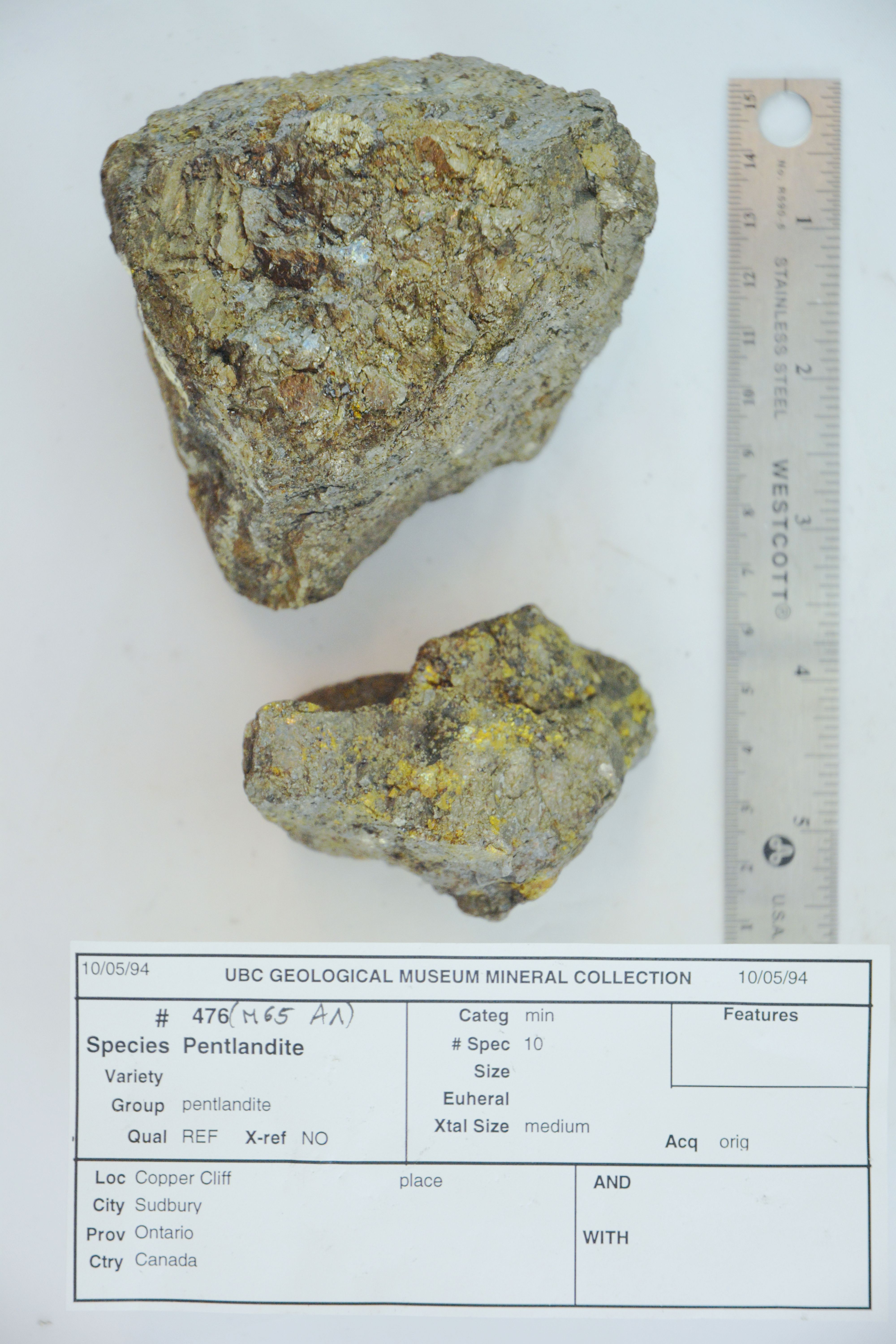
Pentlandite from Sudbury, Ontario, Canada

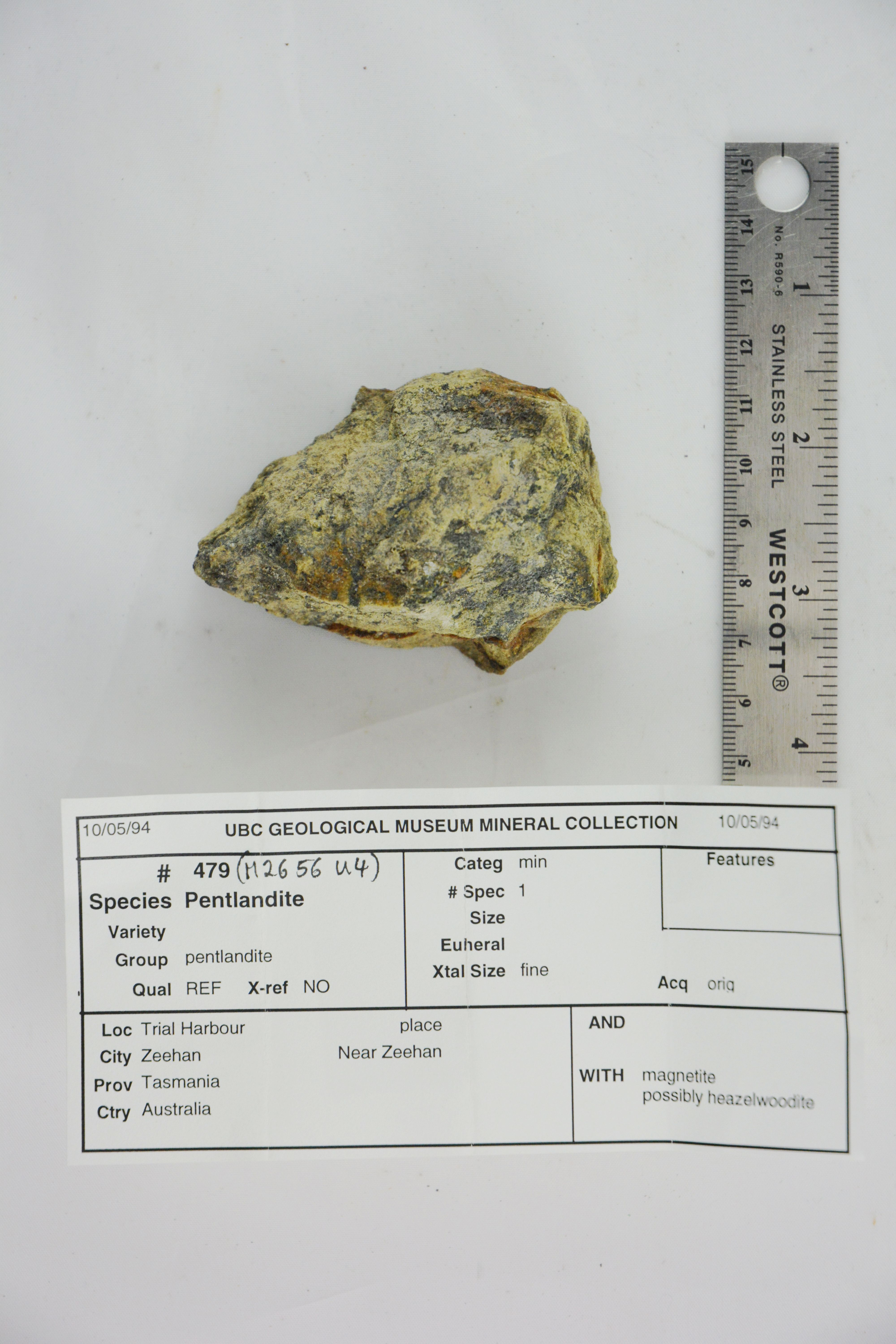
Pentlandite occurring with heazlewoodite and magnetite. Specimen from Trial Harbour, Zeehan, Australia

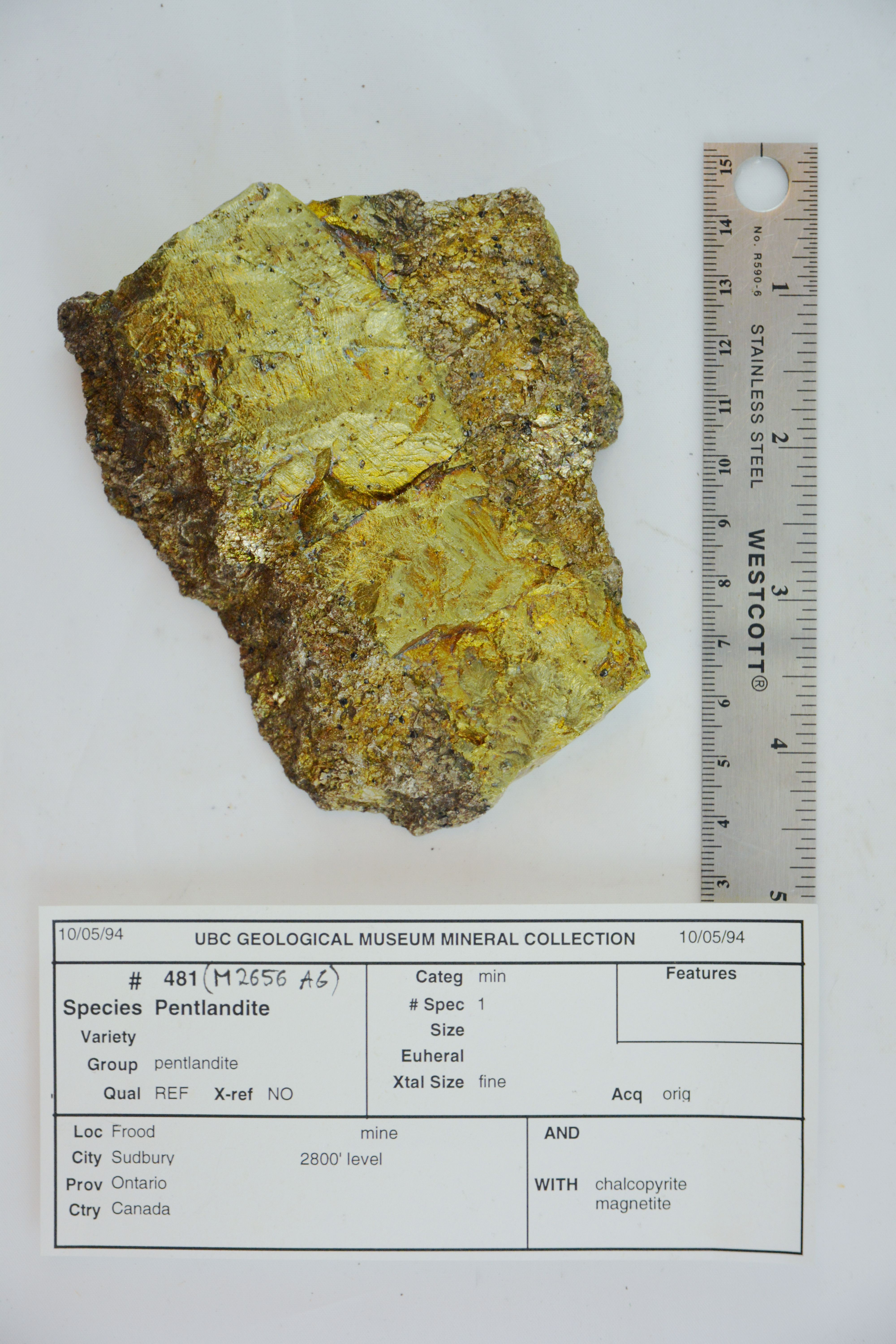
Pentlandite occurring with chalcopyrite and magnetite. Specimen from Sudbury Ontario, Canada

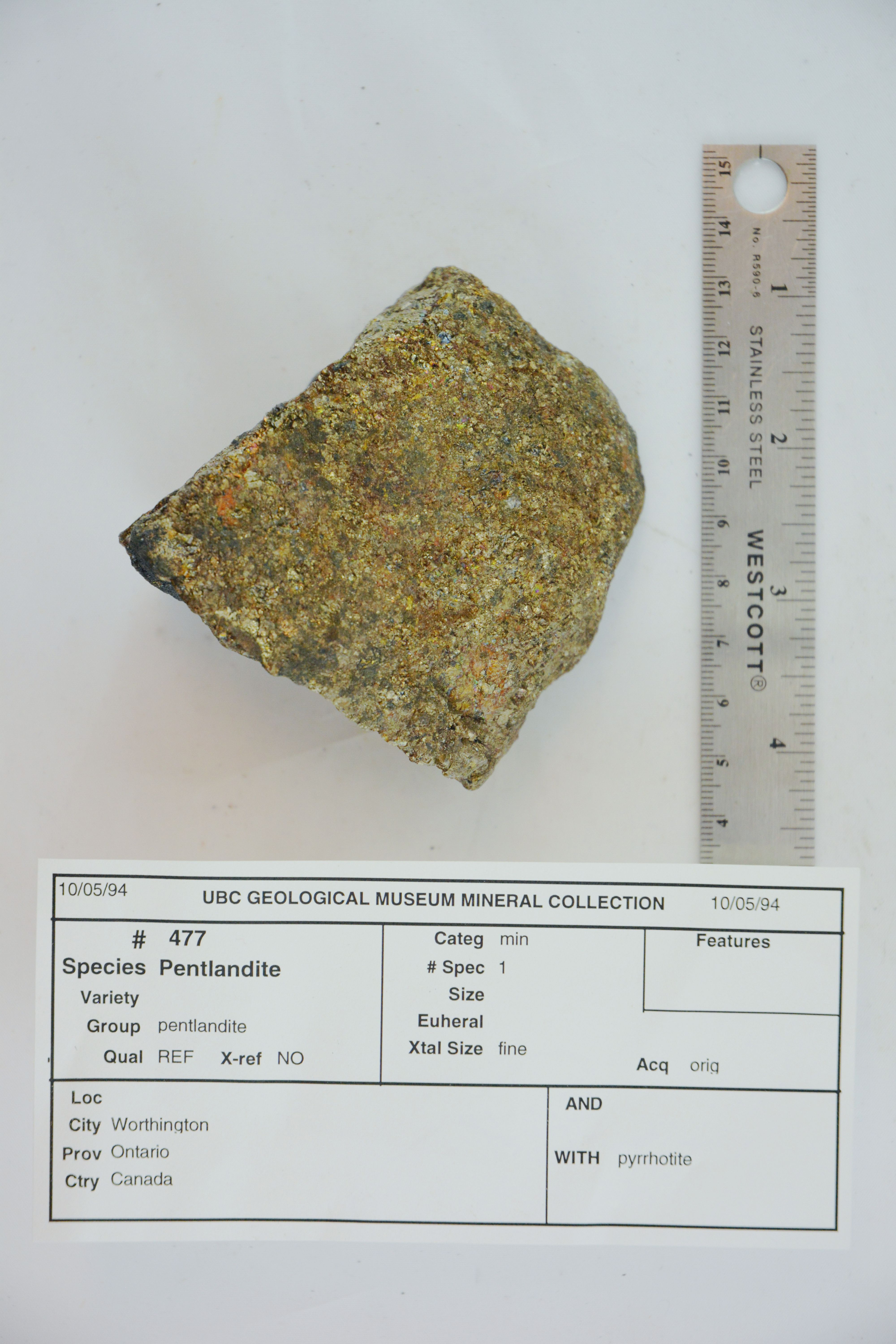
Pentlandite occurring with pyrrhotite. Specimen from Worthington, Ontario, Canada

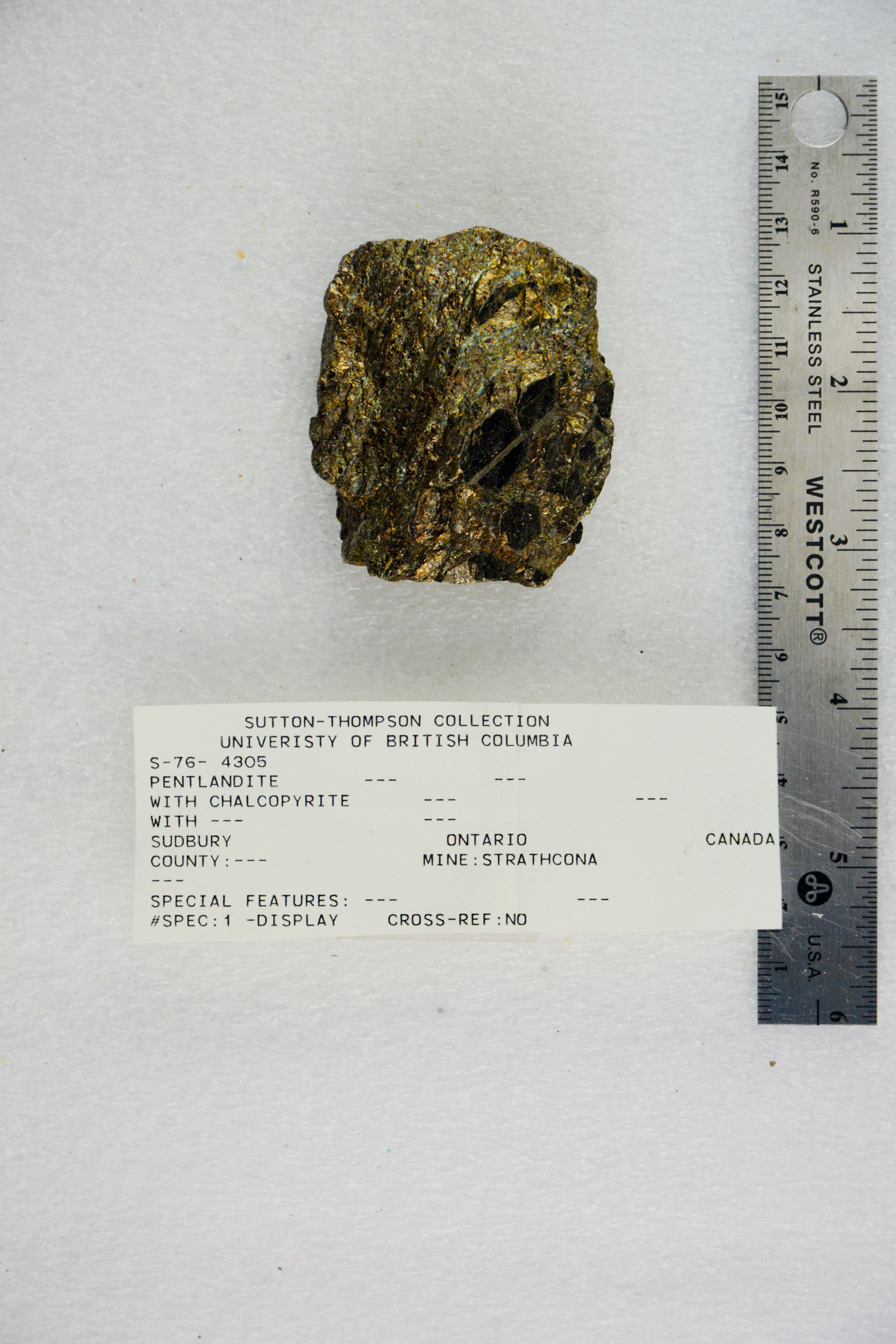
Pentlandite occurring with chalcopyrite. Specimen from Sudbury, Ontario, Canada.

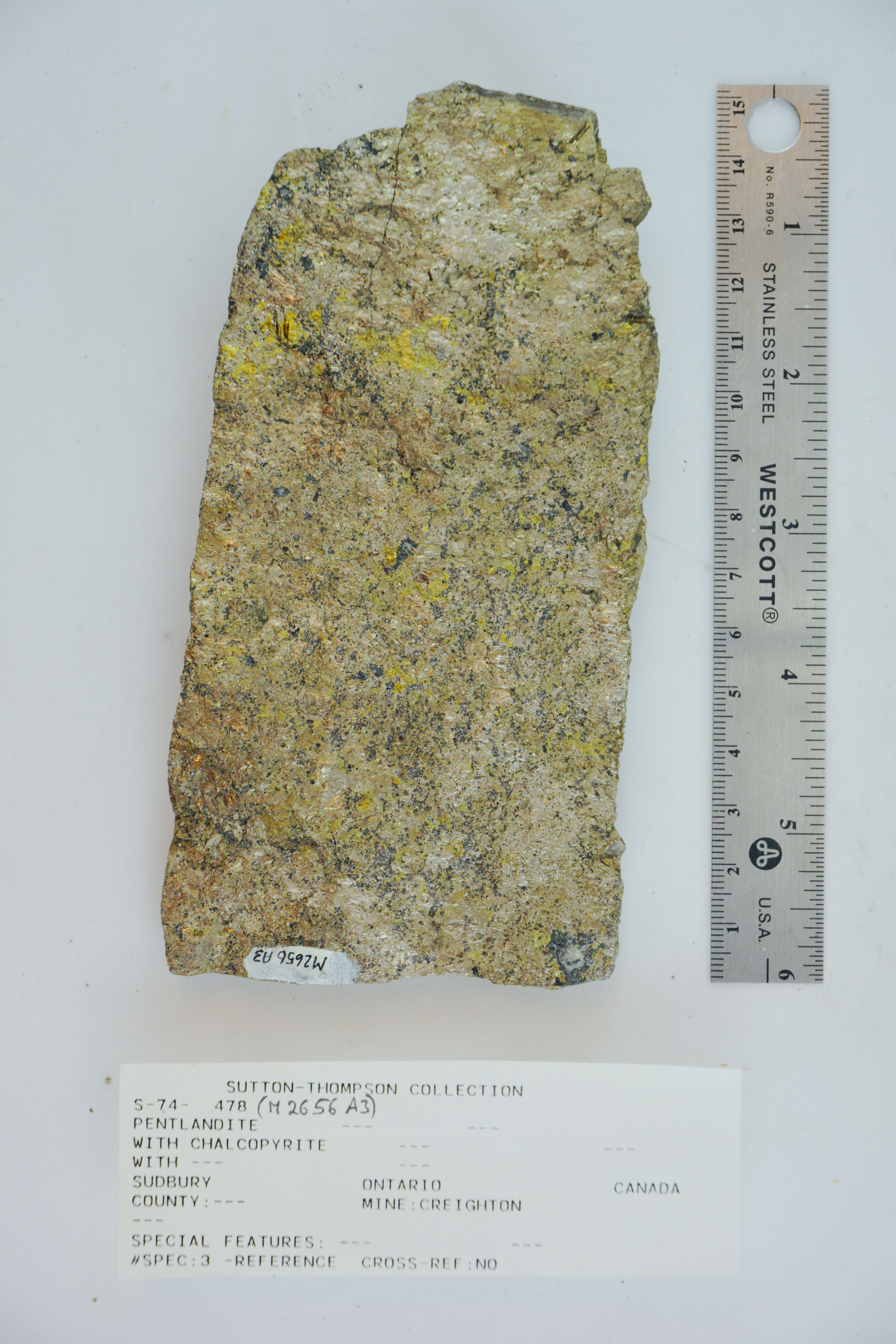
Pentlandite occurring with chalcopyrite. Specimen from Sudbury, Ontario, Canada.

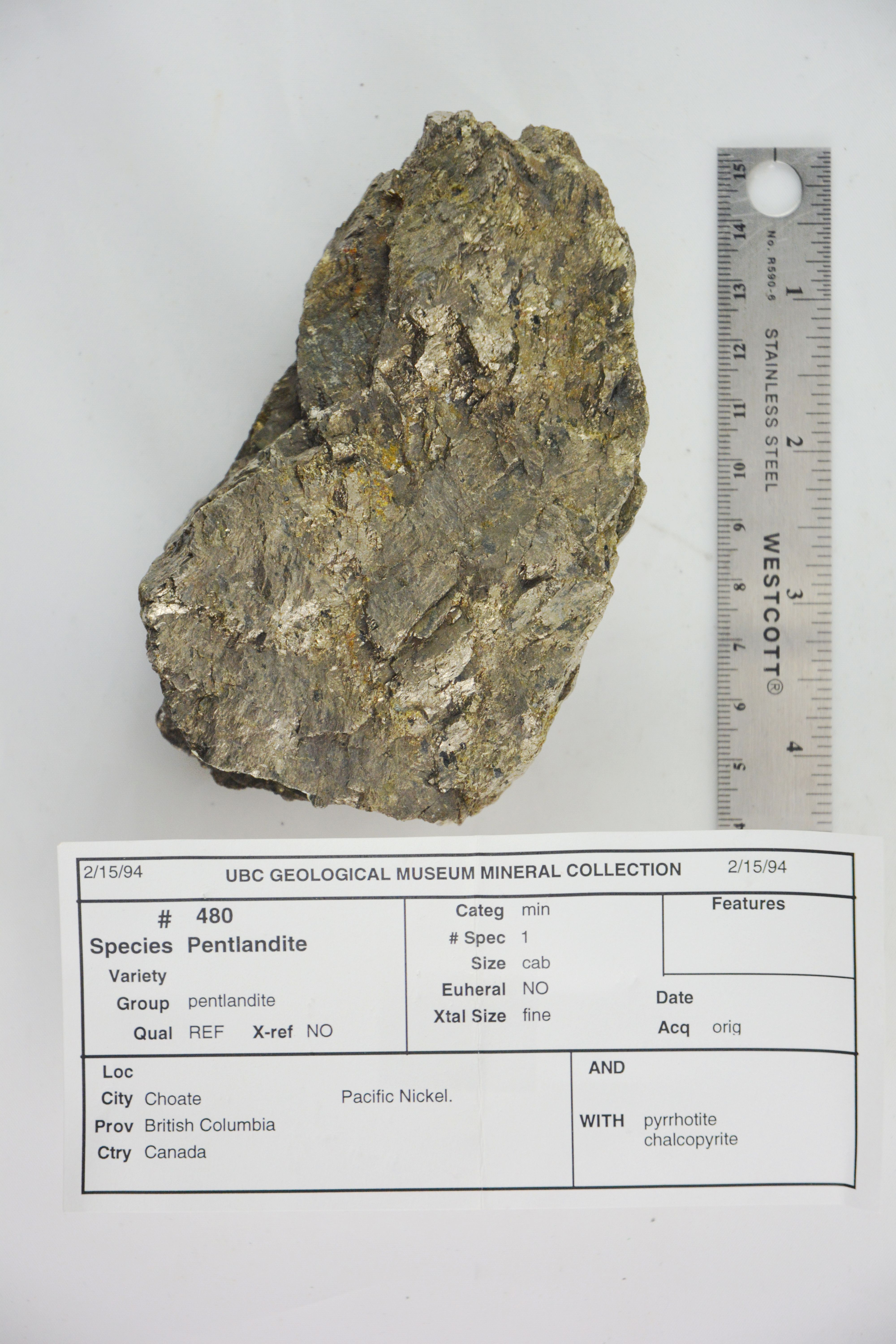
Pentlandite occurring with pyrrhotite and chalcopyrite. Specimen from Choate, British Columbia, Canada

== See also ==
- Glossary of meteoritics
- Ore genesis
- Igneous differentiation
- Rock microstructure
- Ultramafic rocks
- Komatiite
