= Pyrrhotite =

Magnetic iron sulfide mineral

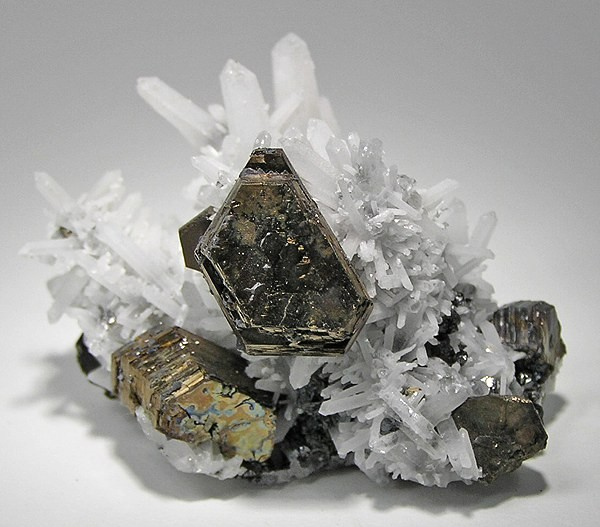
- Brassy, tabular crystals of pyrrhotite, with sphalerite and quartz, from Nikolaevskiy Mine, Primorskiy Kray, Russia. Specimen size: 5.3 × 4.1 × 3.8 cm

General
- Category: Sulfide mineral
- Formula: Fe_{1−x}S (x = 0 to 0.125)
- IMA symbol: Pyh
- Strunz classification: 2.CC.10
- Crystal system: Monoclinic, with hexagonal polytypes
- Crystal class: Prismatic (2/m) (same H-M symbol)
- Space group: A2/a
- Unit cell: a = 11.88 Å, b = 6.87 Å, c = 22.79 Å; β = 90.47°; Z = 26

Identification
- Color: Bronze, dark brown
- Crystal habit: Tabular or prismatic in hexagonal prisms; massive to granular
- Cleavage: Absent
- Fracture: Uneven
- Mohs scale hardness: 3.5 – 4.5
- Luster: Metallic
- Streak: Dark grey – black
- Specific gravity: 4.58 – 4.65, average = 4.61
- Refractive index: Opaque
- Fusibility: 3
- Solubility: Soluble in hydrochloric acid
- Other characteristics: Weakly magnetic, strongly magnetic on heating; non-luminescent, non-radioactive

Pyrrhotite (pyrrhos in Greek meaning "flame-coloured") is an iron sulfide mineral with the formula Fe_{(1−x)}S (x = 0 to 0.125). It is an iron-deficient nonstoichiometric variant of FeS, the mineral known as troilite. Pyrrhotite is also called magnetic pyrite, because the color is similar to pyrite and it is weakly magnetic. The magnetism decreases as the iron content increases, and troilite is non-magnetic. Pyrrhotite is generally tabular and brassy/bronze in color with a metallic luster. The mineral occurs with mafic igneous rocks like norites, and may form from pyrite during metamorphic processes. Pyrrhotite is associated and mined with other sulfide minerals like pentlandite, pyrite, chalcopyrite, and magnetite, and has been found globally.

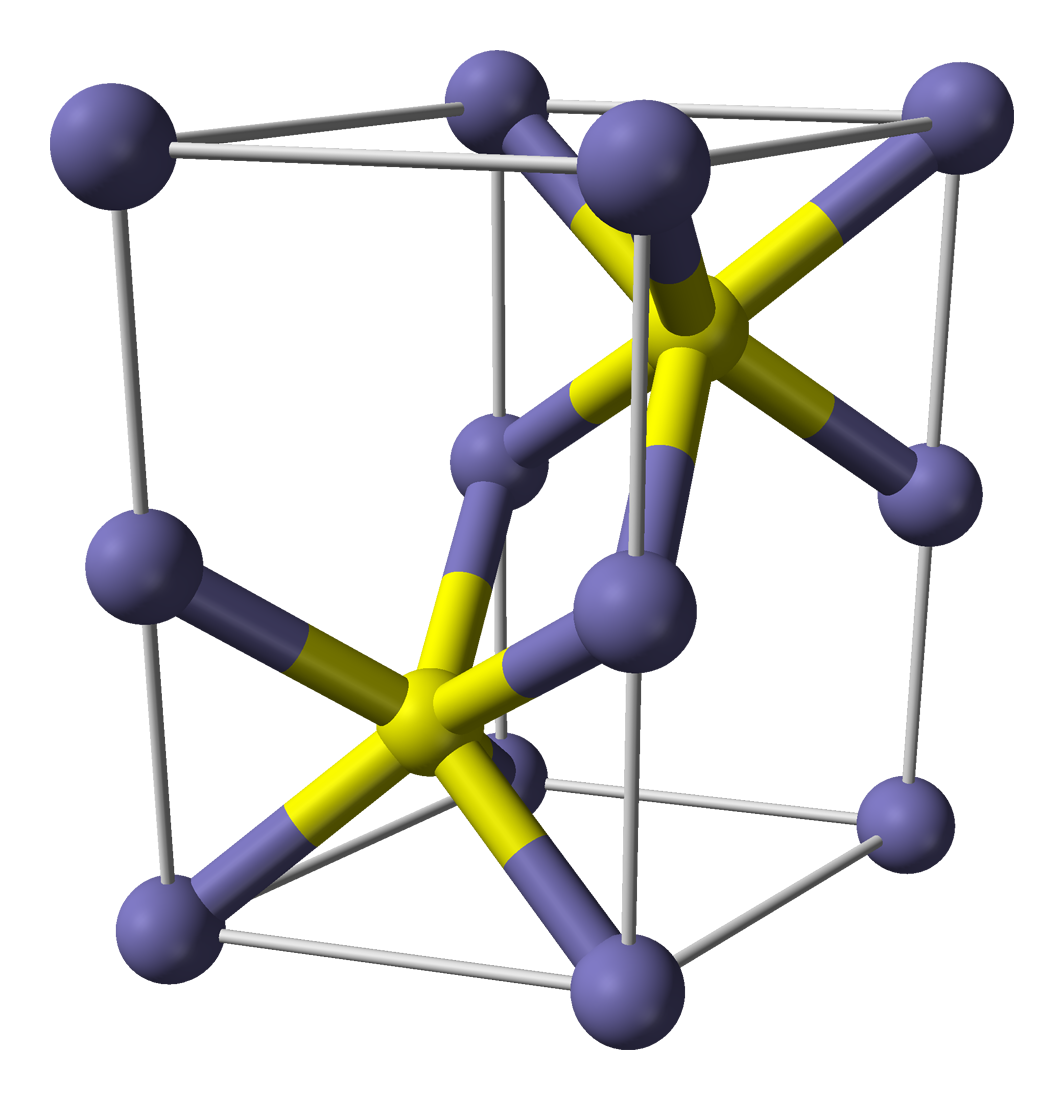
NiAs structure of basic pyrrhotite-1C.

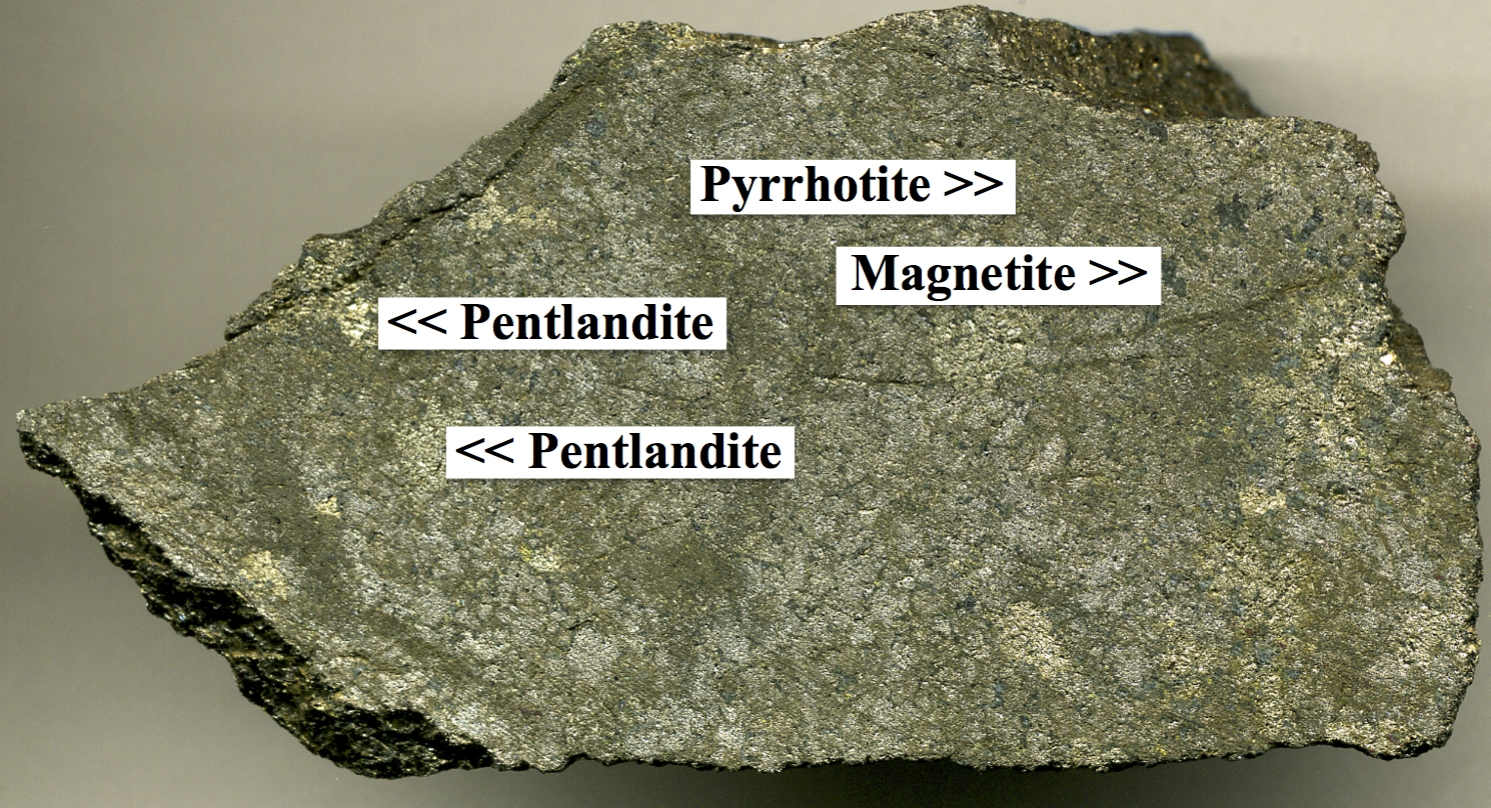
Pyrrhotite with pentlandite (late Paleoproterozoic, 1.85 G… | Flickr

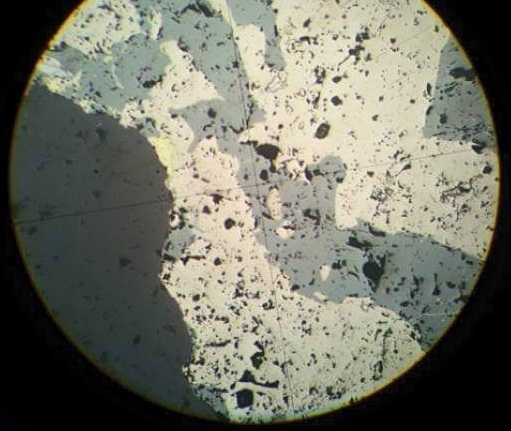
Microscopic image of pyrrhotite under reflected light

== Structure ==
Pyrrhotite exists as a number of polytypes of hexagonal or monoclinic crystal symmetry; several polytypes often occur within the same specimen. Their structure is based on the NiAs unit cell. As such, Fe occupies an octahedral site and the sulfide centers occupy trigonal prismatic sites.

Materials with the NiAs structure often are non-stoichiometric because they lack up to 1/8th fraction of the metal ions, creating vacancies. One of such structures is pyrrhotite-4C (Fe_{7}S_{8}). Here "4" indicates that iron vacancies define a superlattice that is 4 times larger than the unit cell in the "C" direction. The C direction is conventionally chosen parallel to the main symmetry axis of the crystal; this direction usually corresponds to the largest lattice spacing. Other polytypes include: pyrrhotite-5C (Fe_{9}S_{10}), 6C (Fe_{11}S_{12}), 7C (Fe_{9}S_{10}) and 11C (Fe_{10}S_{11}). Every polytype can have monoclinic (M) or hexagonal (H) symmetry, and therefore some sources label them, for example, not as 6C, but 6H or 6M depending on the symmetry. The monoclinic forms are stable at temperatures below 254 °C, whereas the hexagonal forms are stable above that temperature. The exception is for those with high iron content, close to the troilite composition (47 to 50% atomic percent iron) which exhibit hexagonal symmetry.

== Magnetic properties ==
The ideal FeS lattice, such as that of troilite, is non-magnetic. Magnetic properties vary with Fe content. More Fe-rich, hexagonal pyrrhotites are antiferromagnetic. However, the Fe-deficient, monoclinic Fe_{7}S_{8} is ferrimagnetic. The ferromagnetism which is widely observed in pyrrhotite is therefore attributed to the presence of relatively large concentrations of iron vacancies (up to 20%) in the crystal structure. Vacancies lower the crystal symmetry. Therefore, monoclinic forms of pyrrhotite are in general more defect-rich than the more symmetrical hexagonal forms, and thus are more magnetic. Monoclinic pyrrhotite undergoes a magnetic transition known as the Besnus transition at 30 K that leads to a loss of magnetic remanence. The saturation magnetization of pyrrhotite is 0.12 tesla.

== Identification ==
=== Physical properties ===
Pyrrhotite is brassy, bronze, or dark brown in color with a metallic luster and uneven or subconchoidal fracture. Pyrrhotite may be confused with other brassy sulfide minerals like pyrite, chalcopyrite, or pentlandite. Certain diagnostic characteristics can be used for identification in hand samples. Unlike other common brassy-colored sulfide minerals, pyrrhotite is typically magnetic (varies inversely with iron content). On the Mohs hardness scale, pyrrhotite ranges from 3.5 to 4, compared to 6 to 6.5 for pyrite. Streak can be used when properties between pyrrhotite and other sulfide minerals are similar. Pyrrhotite displays a dark grey to black streak. Pyrite will display a greenish black to brownish black streak, chalcopyrite will display a greenish black streak, and pentlandite leaves a pale bronze-brown streak. Pyrrhotite generally displays massive to granular crystal habit, and may show tabular/prismatic or hexagonal crystals which are sometimes iridescent.

Diagnostic characteristics in hand sample include: brassy/bronze color with a grey/black streak, tabular or hexagonal crystals which show iridescence, subconchoidal fracture, metallic luster, and magnetic.

=== Optical properties ===
Pyrrhotite is an opaque mineral and will therefore not transmit light. As a result, pyrrhotite will display extinction when viewed under plane polarized light and cross polarized light, making identification with petrographic polarizing light microscopes difficult. Pyrrhotite, and other opaque minerals can be identified optically using a reflected light ore microscope. The following optical properties are representative of polished/puck sections using ore microscopy:

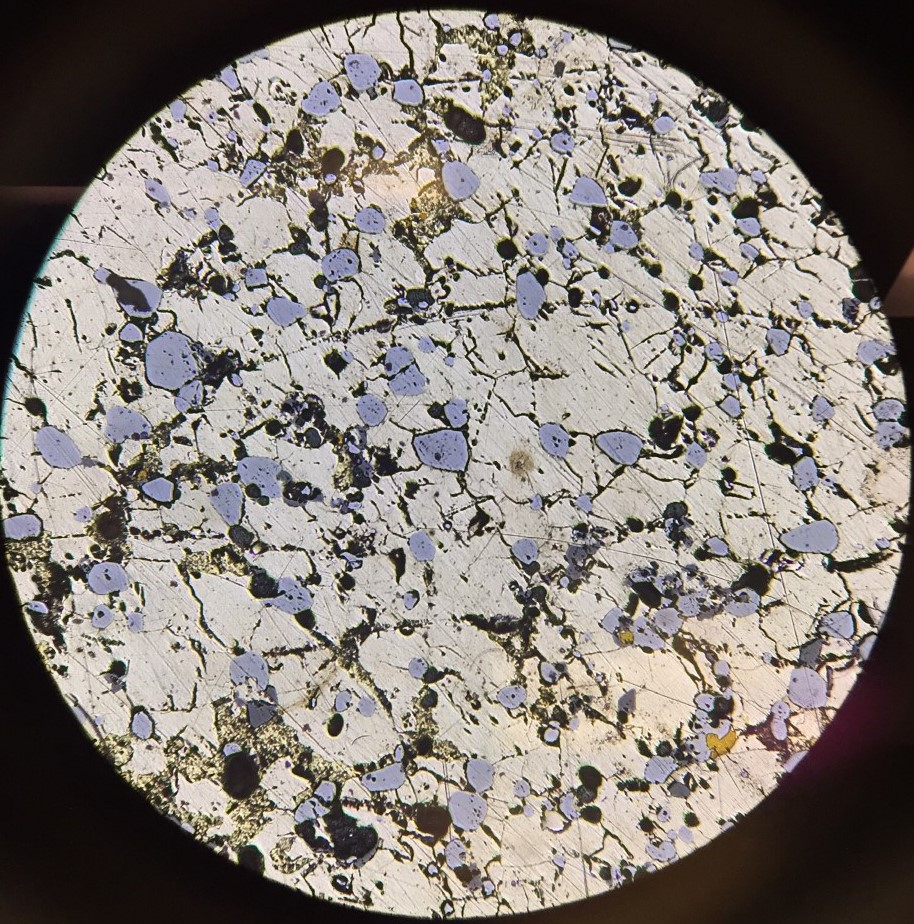
Photomicrograph of pyrrhotite under reflected light appearing as cream-pink to beige irregular anhedral masses (5x/0.12 POL).

Pyrrhotite typically appears as anhedral, granular aggregates and is cream-pink to brownish in color. Weak to strong reflection pleochroism which may be seen along grain boundaries. Pyrrhotite has similar polishing hardness to pentlandite (medium), is softer than pyrite, and harder than chalcopyrite. Pyrrhotite will not display twinning or internal reflections, and its strong anisotropy from yellow to greenish-gray or grayish-blue is characteristic.

Diagnostic characteristics in polished section include: anhedral aggregates, cream-pink to brown in color and strong anisotropy.

== Occurrence ==
Pyrrhotite is a rather common trace constituent of mafic igneous rocks especially norites. It occurs as segregation deposits in layered intrusions associated with pentlandite, chalcopyrite and other sulfides. It is an important constituent of the Sudbury intrusion (1.85 Ga old meteorite impact crater in Ontario, Canada) where it occurs in masses associated with copper and nickel mineralisation. It also occurs in pegmatites and in contact metamorphic zones. Pyrrhotite is often accompanied by pyrite, marcasite and magnetite.

== Formation ==
Pyrrhotite requires both iron and sulfur to form. Iron is the fourth most abundant element in the Earth's continental crust (average abundance of 5.63% or 56,300 mg/kg in the crust), and so the majority of rocks have sufficient iron abundance to form pyrrhotite. However, because sulfur is less abundant (average abundance of 0.035% or 350 mg/kg in the crust), the formation of pyrrhotite is generally controlled by sulfur abundance. Also, the mineral pyrite is both the most common and most abundant sulfide mineral in the Earth's crust. If rocks containing pyrite undergo metamorphism, there is a gradual release of volatile components like water and sulfur from pyrite. The loss of sulfur causes pyrite to recrystallize into pyrrhotite.

Pyrite also decomposes into pyrrhotite in hot reductive technogenic environments, such as blast furnaces and direct coal liquefaction (in which it is an important catalyst).

Pyrrhotite can also form near black smoker hydrothermal vents. Black smokers release high sulfur concentrations onto the sea floor, and when the surrounding rocks are metamorphosed, pyrrhotite can crystallize. Later tectonic processes uplift the metamorphic rocks and expose pyrrhotite to the Earth's surface.

== Distribution ==
=== United States ===
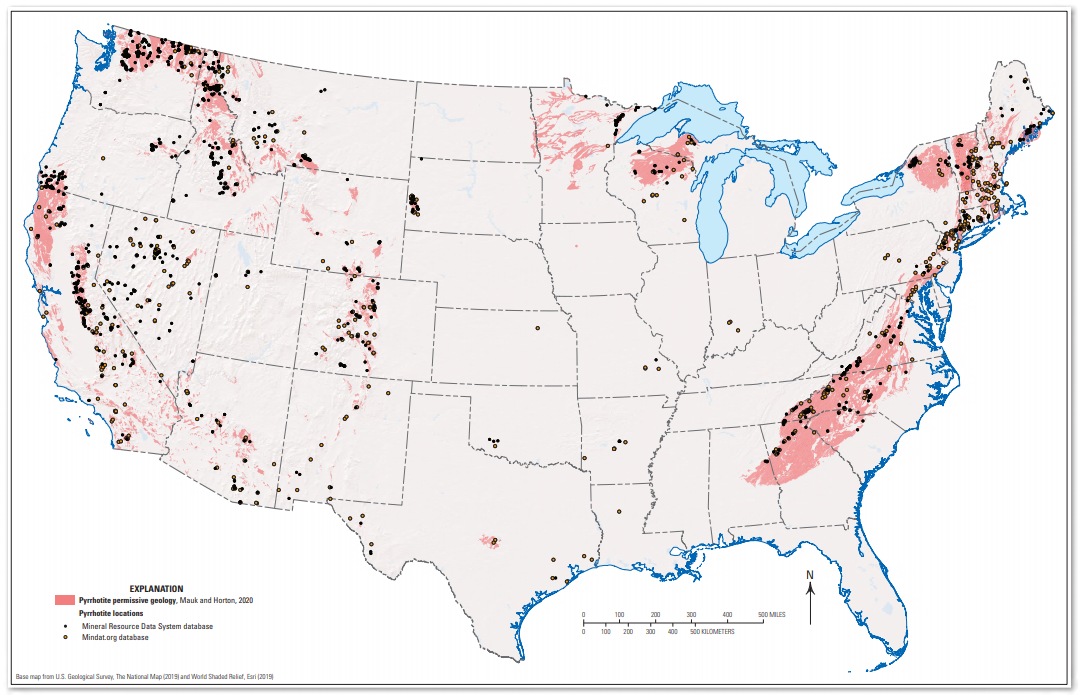
Map of Pyrrhotite Potential Occurrences in the United States (Mauk and Horton, 2020; U.S. Geological Survey, 2019; Mindat.org, 2019).

Pyrrhotite occurs in a variety of locations in the United States. In the eastern United States, pyrrhotite occurs in highly metamorphosed rock that forms a belt along the Appalachian Mountains. Pyrrhotite-bearing rocks are generally unseen in the central United States as the area is unmetamorphosed and underlain by sedimentary rocks which do not contain pyrrhotite. Discontinuous belts that contain pyrrhotite are present in the western United States along the Sierra Nevada mountain range and Cascade Range extending into the northwestern United States. Pyrrhotite may also be found west and south of Lake Superior.

== Mining locations worldwide ==
The following are some of the locations worldwide where pyrrhotite has been reported during mining:

=== Canada ===
| Location | Mine | Main Target Commodities |
|---|---|---|
| British Columbia, Riondel | Bluebell Mine | Cd, Cu, Au, Pb, Ag, Zn |
| Québec | Henderson No. 2 mine (Copper Rand mine) | Cu, Au |
| Québec | B&B Quarry, Shawinigan | Crushed rock (Gabbro) for construction |
| Québec | Maskimo Quarry, Shawinigan | Crushed rock (Gabbro) for construction |

=== US ===
| Location | Mine | Main Target Commodities |
|---|---|---|
| Connecticut | Becker Quarry (Becker's Quarry) | Not given, but abundant quartz, kyanite, and garnet are worthy of mentioning. Note: This was a quarry producing crushed rock aggregate for use in construction |

=== Australia ===
| Location | Mine | Main Target Commodities |
|---|---|---|
| Tasmania | Renison Bell Mine (Renison Mine) | Sn |

=== Brazil ===
| Location | Mine | Main Target Commodities |
|---|---|---|
| Minas Gerais | Morro Velho mine | Au, iron-ore |

=== Italy ===
| Location | Mine | Main Target Commodities |
|---|---|---|
| Tuscany | Bottino Mine | Ag, sulfides |

=== Kosovo ===
| Location | Mine | Main Target Commodities |
|---|---|---|
| Mitrovica District | Trepça Mine | Pb, Ag, Zn |

== Etymology and history ==
Named in 1847 by Ours-Pierre-Armand Petit-Dufrénoy. "Pyrrhotite" is derived from the Greek word πυρρός, "pyrrhos", meaning flame-colored.

== Sulfide oxidation in construction aggregates leading to concrete degradation ==
Pyrrhotite-containing rocks cannot be used as aggregates for concrete, because sulfate ions released by pyrrhotite oxidation readily cause an internal sulfate attack (ISA) in concrete. This is an insidious and severe form of concrete degradation. Pyrrhotite has been linked to crumbling concrete basements in Quebec, Massachusetts and Connecticut where local quarries extracted insufficiently characterised aggregates for making concrete. Many houses in Ireland, particularly in County Donegal, have also been affected by pyrrhotite inclusions present in aggregates improperly selected for making concrete. The iron sulfide it contains can naturally react with oxygen and water, and over time pyrrhotite breaks down into sulfuric acid and forms secondary minerals such as ettringite, thaumasite and gypsum. These newly formed alteration products occupy a larger volume than pyrrhotite. Their expansion induces tensile stress in the concrete matrix, causing the concrete to crack and leading to the failure of home foundations or concrete structures.

== Uses ==
Other than a source of sulfur, pyrrhotite does not have specific applications. It is generally not a valuable mineral unless significant nickel, copper, or other metals are present. Iron is seldom extracted from pyrrhotite due to a complicated metallurgical process. It is mined primarily because it is associated with pentlandite, (Fe,Ni)_{9}S_{8}, a sulfide mineral that can contain significant amounts of nickel and cobalt. When found in mafic and ultramafic rocks, pyrrhotite can be a good indicator of economic nickel deposits.

== Mineral abbreviations ==
Table of pyrrhotite mineral abbreviations. Note: only use official IMA-CNMNC symbol listed in bold text.
| Abbreviation | Source |
|---|---|
| **Pyh** | **IMA-CNMNC** |
| Po | Whitney and Evans, 2010; The Canadian Mineralogist, 2019. |

== Synonyms ==
Synonyms of the mineral pyrrhotite.
| Magnetic pyrite | Magnetopyrite | Magnetic pyrites |
| Pyrrhotine | Pyrrohotite | Magnetic iron pyrites |
| Dipyrite | Kroeberite | Vattenkies |
