= Nonmagmatic meteorite =

Deprecated term formerly used in meteoritics

- — Class —
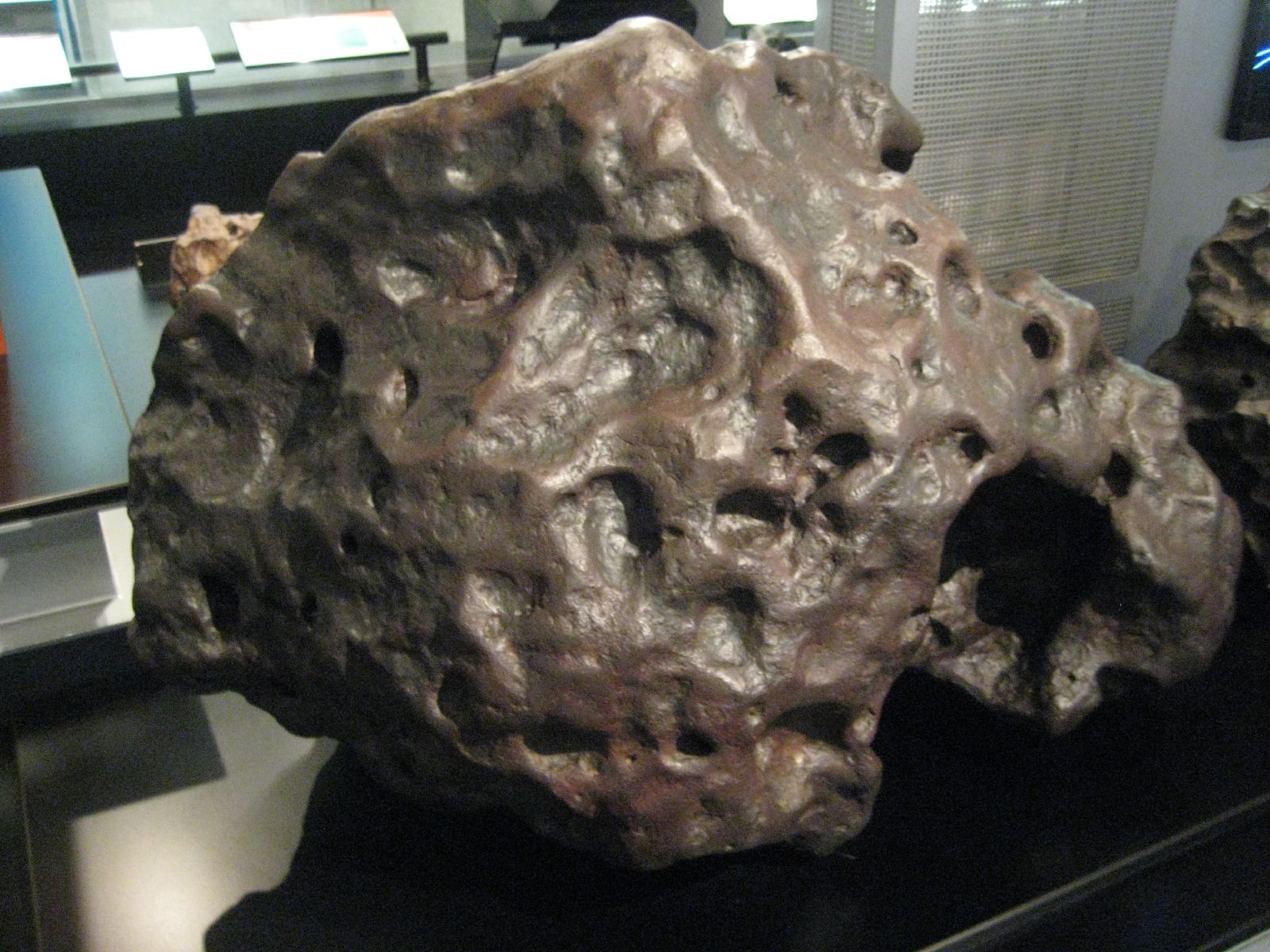
- Goose Lake Meteorite is an IAB meteorite in the sLL subgroup (low-Au, low-Ni)
- Compositional type: Iron
- Type: Iron
- Subgroups: IAB; IIE; IIICD
- Alternative names: Nonmagmatic iron meteorites

Nonmagmatic meteorite (also nonmagmatic iron meteorite) is a deprecated term formerly used in meteoritics to describe iron meteorites that were originally thought to have not formed by igneous processes, to differentiate them from the magmatic meteorites, produced by the crystallization of a metal melt. The concept behind this was developed in the 1970s, but it was quickly realized that igneous processes actually play a vital role in the formation of the so-called "nonmagmatic" meteorites. Today, the terms are still sometimes used, but usage is discouraged because of the ambiguous meanings of the terms magmatic and nonmagmatic. The meteorites that were described to be nonmagmatic are now understood to be the product of partial melting and impact events and are grouped with the primitive achondrites and the achondrites.

== Description ==
Iron meteorites are derived from planetary cores of asteroids and planetesimals. The formation of metallic cores depends on the heat of radionuclides that lead to melting and differentiation into a core and a silicate mantle. While the parent body of the meteorites cools off, the metallic core crystallizes into meteoric iron, an iron-nickel alloy.

In the 1970s, it was realized that some of the iron meteorite groups had properties that were incompatible with this formation mechanism, leading some scientists to posit that they were not formed through this mechanism.

Today, the processes that lead to these unusual properties are described as partial melting and subsequent fast cooling, which prevented melt migration. The most likely cause for this to happen are impact events.

The term "nonmagmatic" is still sometimes used to refer to this grouping of meteorites, although its use is now deprecated.

== Subdivision ==
Three iron meteorite groups are described as being part of the nonmagmatic meteorites. They share a number of similarities, the most easily recognizable is that they contain many silicate inclusions composed of olivine, pyroxene and feldspar. Other iron meteorites can also contain silicate inclusions but with different mineralogy (IVA for example has tridymite and pyroxene). Two of those groups, the IAB and the IIICD meteorites are now classified as primitive achondrites. The IIE meteorites are now classified as regular achondrites.

The following table shows the groups are described as nonmagmatic and their classification:

Group	Currently classified as	Compositional type
IAB	Primitive achondrite	Iron meteorite
IIICD	Primitive achondrite	Iron meteorite
IIE	Achondrite	Iron meteorite

== See also ==
- Glossary of meteoritics
