= Gay Gulch meteorite =

Iron meteorite

Gay Gulch
- Type: Iron
- Structural classification: Nickel-rich ataxite
- Group: IAB-sHH
- Country: Canada
- Region: Yukon, Canada
- Coordinates: 63.91667°N 139.33333°W
- Observed fall: no
- Found date: 1901
- TKW: 0.483 kilograms (1.06 lb)

Gay Gulch is an iron meteorite found in 1901 by miners near Dawson City, Yukon Territory, using a slice box to mine alluvial gold. They were exploiting Pliocene gravel, hence the meteorite may have fallen at that time.

== Classification ==
It is a nickel-rich ataxite, IAB-sHH.

== Fragments ==
The main mass is in the National Meteorite Collection, Ottawa.

== See also ==
- Glossary of meteoritics
- Meteorite find
