= Brachina meteorite =

Meteorite found in Australia

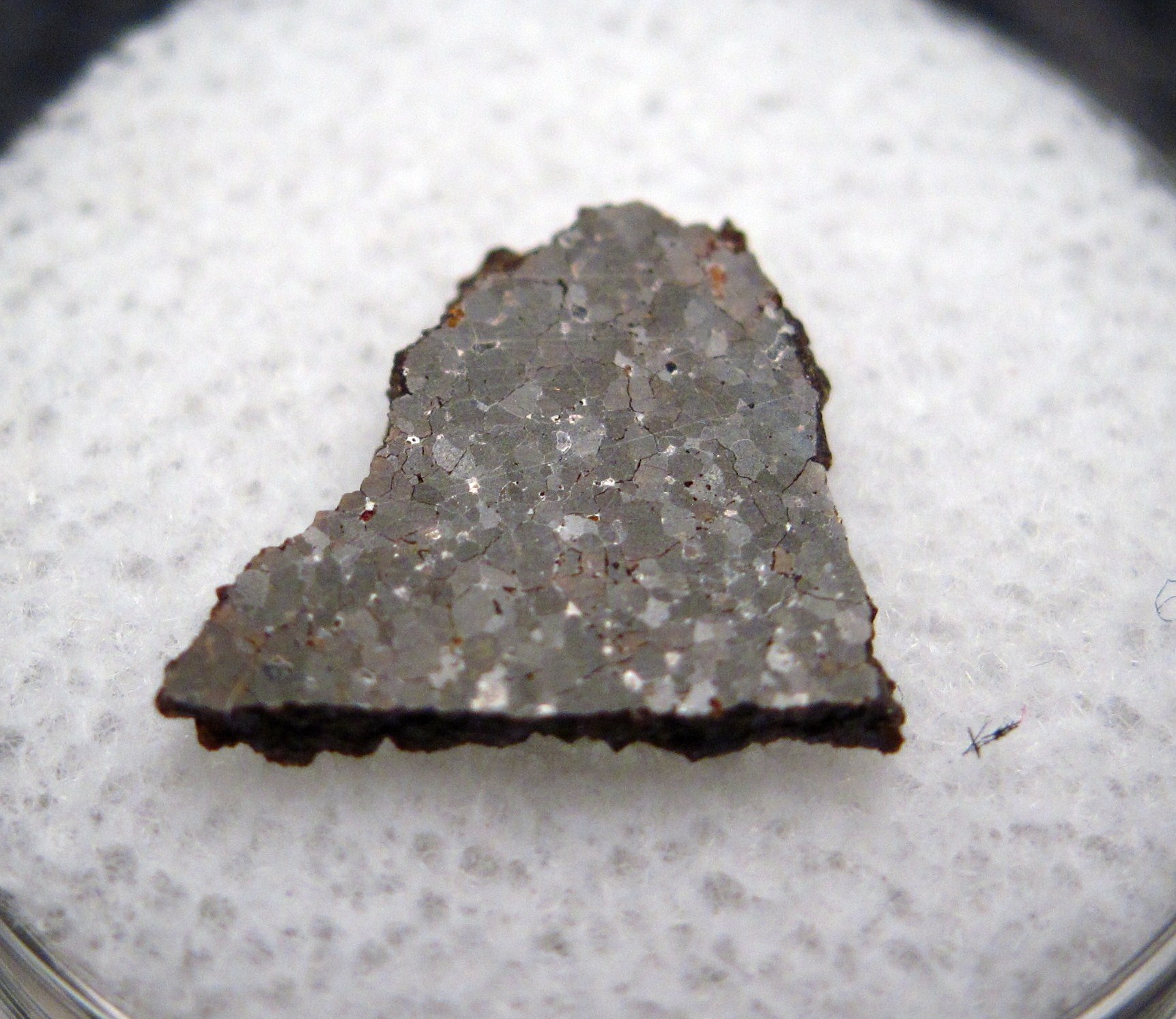
- Partial slice of NWA 3151 brachinite, a rare olivine-rich achondrite weighing 0.410 grams (0.0145 oz)
- Type: Primitive achondrite
- Class: Asteroidal achondrite
- Group: Brachinite
- Composition: olivine, plagioclase, clinopyroxene, iron-sulfide, chromite, chlorapatite, pentlandite, meteoric iron, melt inclusions
- Country: Australia
- Region: South Australia
- Coordinates: 31.300000°S 138.383333°E
- Observed fall: No
- Found date: 26 May 1974
- TKW: 202.85 grams (7.155 oz) (2 fragments)

The Brachina meteorite is the type specimen of the brachinites class of the asteroidal achondrites.

== Naming and discovery ==
The meteorite is named after Brachina in South Australia. Two fragments (total 200 g) were found by B.M. Eves at 31.300000°S 138.383333°E on 26 May 1974.

== Description ==
The mineral composition of the Brachina meteorite is olivine (80%), plagioclase (10%), Clinopyroxene (5.5%), iron-sulfide (3%), chromite (0.5%), chlorapatite (0.5%) and pentlandite (0.3%) and traces of meteoric iron. Melt inclusions consist of glass with orthopyroxene and anorthoclase. The chemical and mineralogical composition is similar to the Chassigny meteorite, but the trace elements are fundamentally different.

== Parent body ==
Melt inclusions indicate that there were melting processes active on the brachinite parent body.

== Classification ==
The meteorite was classified as a chassignite in 1978, but in 1983 trace element analysis showed that the Brachina meteorite was fundamentally different from Chassigny. It was therefore proposed that the meteorite should be the type specimen of a new meteorite class, the brachinites. This classification has remained valid since then.

== See also ==
- Glossary of meteoritics
