= Millbillillie (meteorite) =

Meteorite found in Western Australia

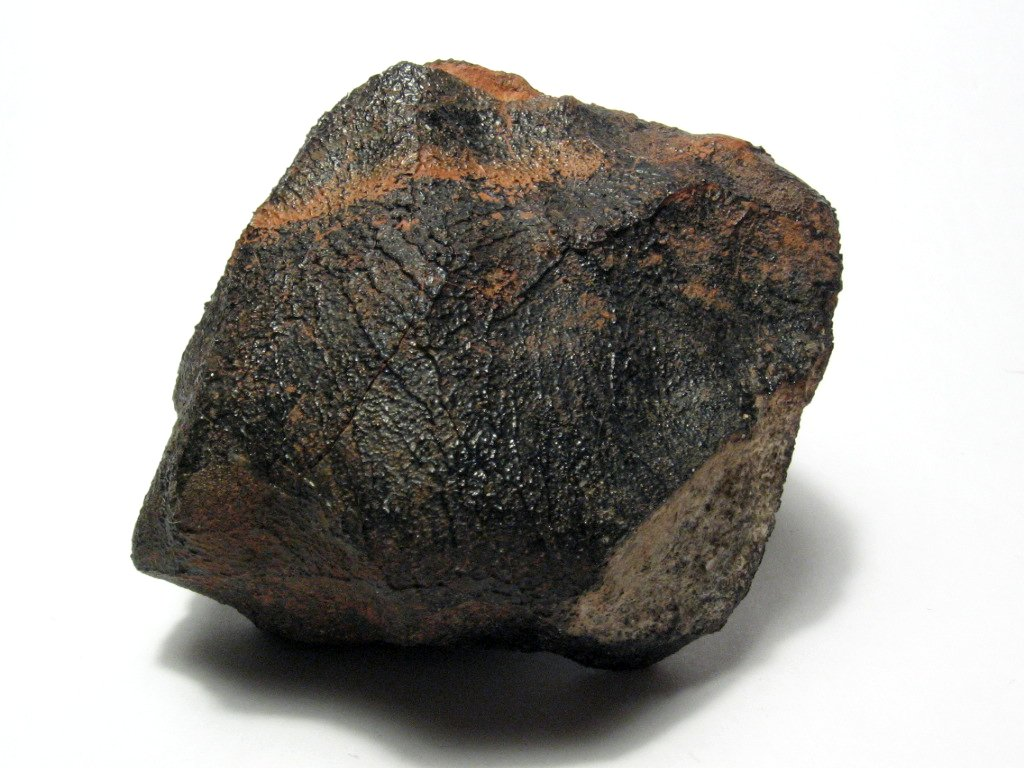
- A 175-gram (6.2 oz) individual of the Millbillillie meteorite shower, a eucrite achondrite that fell in Western Australia in 1960. This specimen is about 6 centimetres (2.4 in) wide. Note the shiny black fusion crust with flow lines. The chip at lower right allows one to see the light-gray interior. The orange staining at top is a result of weathering, as these stones were not recovered until many years after they fell.
- Type: Achondrite
- Clan: HED meteorites
- Group: Eucrite
- Parent body: Possibly 4 Vesta
- Country: Australia
- Region: Millbillillie & Jundee Stations, Wiluna district, Western Australia
- Coordinates: 26°27′S 120°22′E
- Observed fall: Yes
- Fall date: 1960-10
- Found date: 1970
- TKW: 330 kg (730 lb)
- Strewn field: Yes
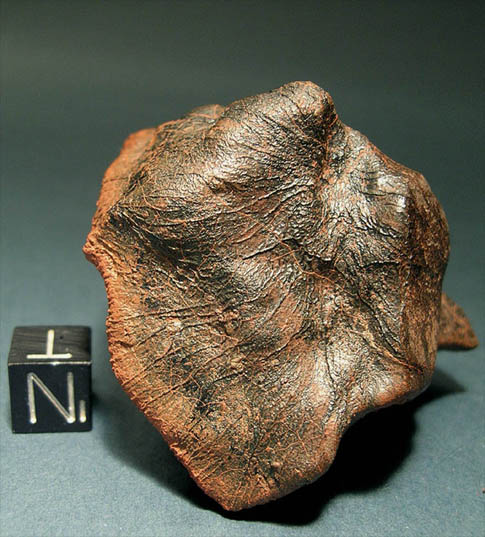
- 77 grams (2.7 oz) oriented specimen of the Millbillillie eucrite meteorite.
- Related media on Wikimedia Commons

Millbillillie is a meteorite named after the cattle station in Western Australia on which it fell in October 1960. It is classified as a eucrite achondrite, a kind of stony meteorite.

== History ==
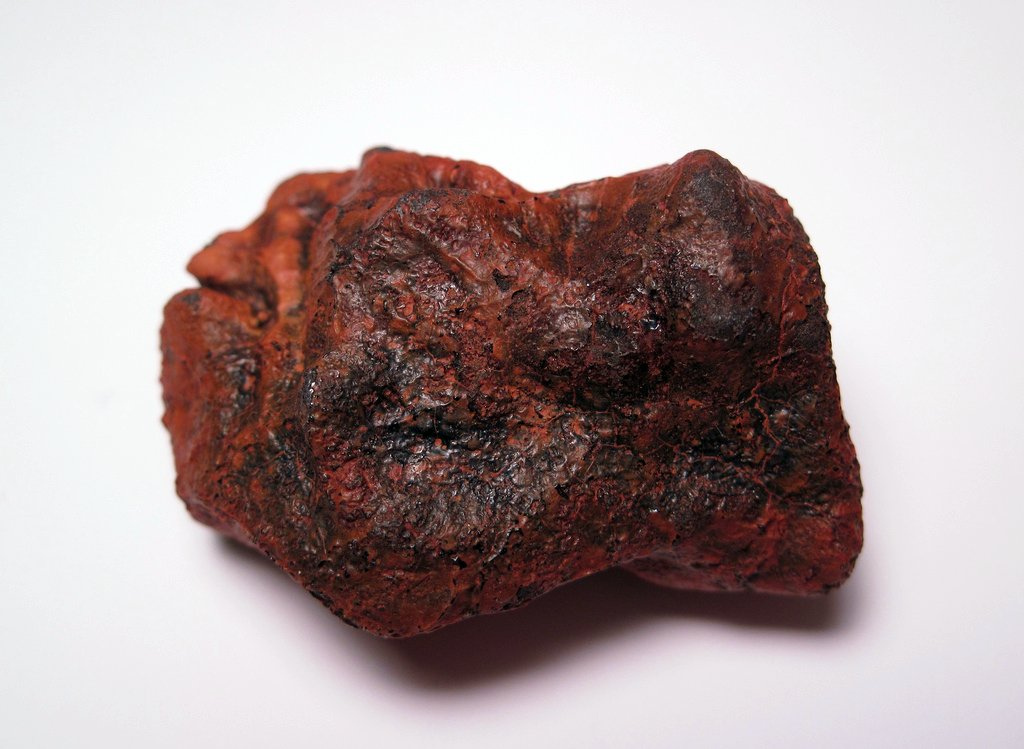
21.78 grams (0.768 oz) complete specimen.

A fireball was observed "with sparks coming off it" by two stationworkers while they were opening a gate in the boundary fence on a track between Millbillillie and Jundee cattle stations. The object fell on a plain to the north. No search was made at the time but in 1970 and 1971 locals found two stones; Aboriginals have found others since. The largest stone weighed 20 kilograms (44 lb). It and a smaller one of 565 grams (19.9 oz) are held by the Western Australian Museum.

== See also ==
- Glossary of meteoritics
