= Osseo meteorite =

Meteorite found in Ontario, Canada

Osseo
- Type: Iron
- Structural classification: coarse octahedrite
- Group: IAB
- Country: Canada
- Region: Ontario, Canada
- Coordinates: 47°39′00″N 80°05′00″W
- Observed fall: no
- Found date: June 1931
- TKW: 46.3 kilograms (102 lb)

Osseo is an iron meteorite found in 1931 by Mr. Frank Johnston about 5 kilometres (3.1 mi) from Osseo, Ontario. It was about 30 centimetres (12 in) long. No fireball was observed and there was no evidence that it was a recent fall.

== Classification ==
It is a coarse octahedrite, IAB complex.

== Fragments ==
The main mass is in the Smithsonian Institution, Washington.

== See also ==
- Glossary of meteoritics
