= Toluca (meteorite) =

Group of meteorites found in Mexico

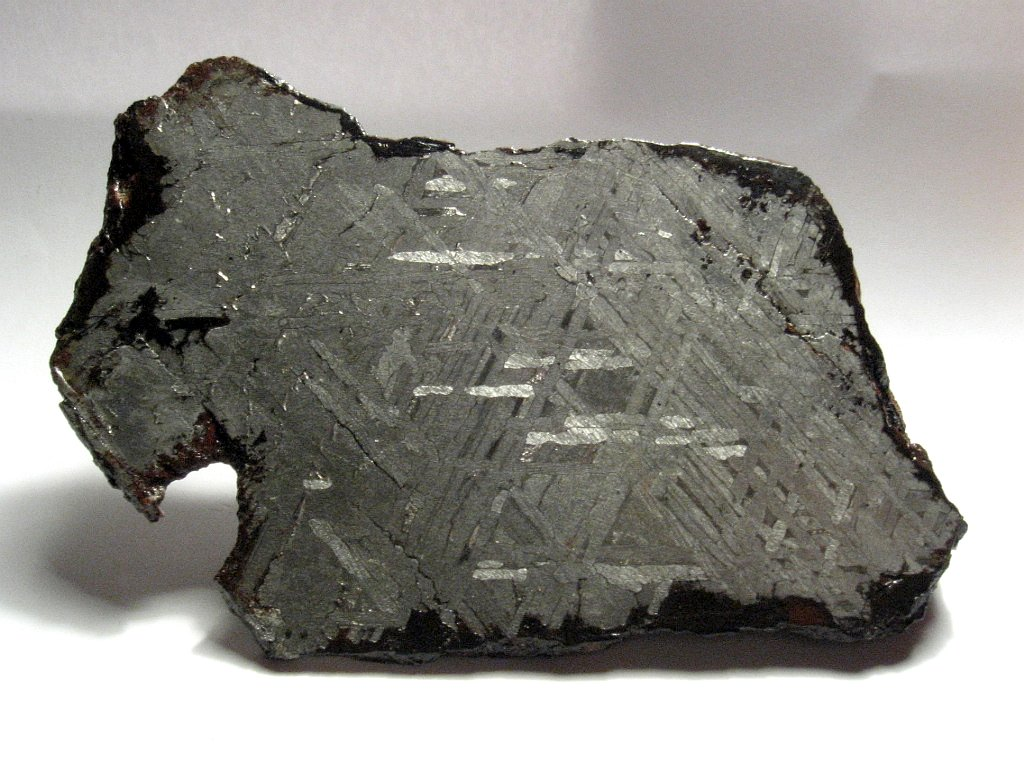
- 500g Toluca slice
- Type: Iron
- Structural classification: Coarse Octahedrite
- Group: IAB-sLL
- Composition: 90.5% Fe; 8.1% Ni
- Country: Mexico
- Region: Toluca Valley, Jiquipilco, Mexico State
- Coordinates: 19°27′N 99°35′W
- Observed fall: No
- Fall date: >10,000 years ago
- Found date: about 1776
- TKW: 3 tonnes
- Related media on Wikimedia Commons

Toluca is a group of iron meteorites found in Jiquipilco, Mexico near Toluca.

== History ==
The meteorites probably crashed into Earth more than 10,000 years ago. For centuries, Mexican people living near the meteorites used them as a source of metal for various tools. They were first described by conquistadores in about 1776.

The total known mass is about 3 tonnes.

== Composition and classification ==
These iron meteorites are a coarse octahedrite, chemical type IAB-sLL. The mean composition is 90.5% Fe and 8.1% Ni. They often contain large troilite inclusions.

== See also ==
- Glossary of meteoritics
