= Winona meteorite =

Meteorite found in the United States

Winona
- Type: Primitive achondrite
- Group: Winonaite
- Parent body: Winonaite-IAB-IIICD
- Composition: Enstatite, olivine, meteoric iron, plagioclase, troilite
- Country: United States
- Region: Arizona
- Coordinates: 35°12′N 111°24′W
- Observed fall: No
- Found date: 1928
- TKW: 24 kilograms (53 lb)

The Winona meteorite is a primitive achondrite meteorite. It is the type specimen and by far the largest meteorite of the winonaite group.

== Discovery and naming ==
The Winona meteorite is named after Winona, Arizona. The meteorite is said to be discovered during an archaeological excavation of the Sinagua village Elden Pueblo in September 1928. The Sinagua lived in the village between 1150 and 1275. The meteorite was said to be retrieved from the cist of one of the rooms. In fact the meteorite was found at another Sinagua site and not in Elden Pueblo

When the meteorite was removed from the cist it fell apart because it was badly weathered. The first description was made in 1929. The authors were of the opinion that the meteorite was too badly weathered to be accurately classified. They estimated that the meteorite was probably a mesosiderite.

== Mineralogy ==
The meteorite consists of enstatite, olivine, meteoric iron, plagioclase, troilite. Accessory minerals include alabandite, apatite, chromite, daubréelite, diopside, graphite.

== See also ==
- Glossary of meteoritics
