= Penouille meteorite =

Iron meteorite found in 1984 in Canada

Penouille
- Type: Iron
- Structural classification: medium octahedrite
- Group: IAB
- Composition: 9.4% Ni; 365 ppm Ge; 63 ppm Ga; 3.66 ppm Ir; 1.98 ppm Au; 5850 ppm Co
- Country: Canada
- Region: Quebec, Canada
- Coordinates: 48°51′00″N 64°26′00″W
- Observed fall: no
- Found date: 1984
- TKW: 0.072 kilograms (0.16 lb)

Penouille is an iron meteorite found in 1984 in Canada.

== History ==
A small ellipsoidal meteorite of 72g was found in summer 1984 by an eight-year-old boy, Christian Couture of Repentigny, Quebec, on a beach to the seaward side of the Presqu'ile de Penouille, a peninsula in the Baie de Gaspé. The site is approximately 1 kilometre (0.62 mi) south of the village of Penouille, historic Comte Gaspe-Est.

== Classification ==
It is a medium octahedrite, IAB complex.

== Fragments ==
Terrestrial oxidation, abrasion and corrosion of this meteorite were not extensive and the fall is thought to have been relatively recent. The main mass is conserved at the Planetarium de Montreal, Canada.

== See also ==
- Glossary of meteoritics

== Bibliography ==
- Meteoritical Bulletin 78
- Meteoritics 30
