= Tamdakht meteorite =

Meteorite that fell in Morocco in 2008

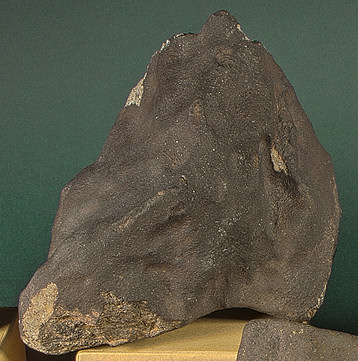
- Type: Ordinary chondrite
- Class: H5
- Shock stage: S3
- Weathering grade: W0
- Country: Morocco
- Region: Ouarzazate
- Coordinates: 31°09.8′N 7°00.9′W
- Observed fall: Yes
- Fall date: 2008-12-20
- Found date: 2009-01-03 ff
- TKW: ~100 kilograms (220 lb)
- Strewn field: Yes

The Tamdakht meteorite fell near Ouarzazate, Morocco on 20 December 2008 producing a strewn field of approximately 25 kilometres (16 mi) by 2 kilometres (1.2 mi) and two small impact craters, one of about 1.1 metres (3 ft 7 in) diameter and 70 centimetres (28 in) depth at 31°09.8′N 7°00.9′W and the other of about 20 centimetres (7.9 in) diameter and 10 centimetres (3.9 in) depth at 31°09.9′N 07°02.3′W.

The meteorite is named after a village close to the fall.

On April 22, 2017, small bits of the meteorite were handed out to children at the Boston March for Science.

== Mineralogy ==
Petrology: (by Albert Jambon, Omar Boudouma, D. Badia UPVI and M. Denise, MNHNP): Abundant chondrules with visible but not well-delimited outlines. Chondrule size is 0.1 to 1.5 mm. Dominant olivine and orthopyroxene. Abundant chromite, rare clinopyroxene and ilmenite. Numerous pockets with chromite, plagioclase and phosphate (merrilite and Cl-apatite). Kamacite, with deformed Neumann bands, and taenite, twinned troilite. Copper. Mode: metal+troilite 10%.

Mineral compositions and geochemistry: log χ = 5.3. Olivine Fa18 ± 0.5 Opx = En83 Fs16 Wo2 Minor calcic pyroxene. Plagioclase is Ab83–86 An5–15 Or7–2. Ca-phosphate (merrillite and Cl-apatite). Chromite: Cr# (100× molar Cr/[Cr + Al]) = 82. Metal: kamacite with 5% Ni and taenite with 36–47% Ni. Oxygen isotopes (C. Suavet, J. Gattacecca CEREGE): δ17O = 3.26‰, δ18O = 5.01‰, and Δ17O = 0.65‰. Magnetic susceptibility is log χ = 5.3 × 10–9 m3/kg.

== Classification ==
Ordinary chondrite (H5), S3, W0.

== Other ==
- In 2016, the Cook Islands issued a collector coin in which a piece of the meteorite is embedded.

== See also ==
- Glossary of meteoritics
