= Nantan meteorite =

Meteorite found in China

Nantan
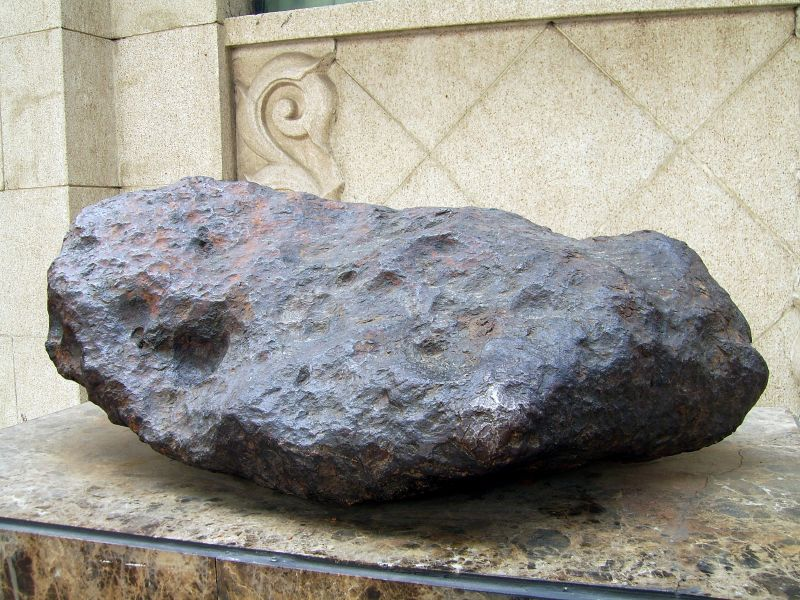
- Group: IIICD (2000), IAB-MG (2006)
- Composition: Meteoric iron: 6.96% Nickel.
- Country: China
- Region: Guangxi
- Coordinates: 25°6′N 107°42′E
- Observed fall: Possible
- Fall date: 1516
- Found date: 1958
- TKW: 9,500 kilograms (20,900 lb)
- Strewn field: Yes
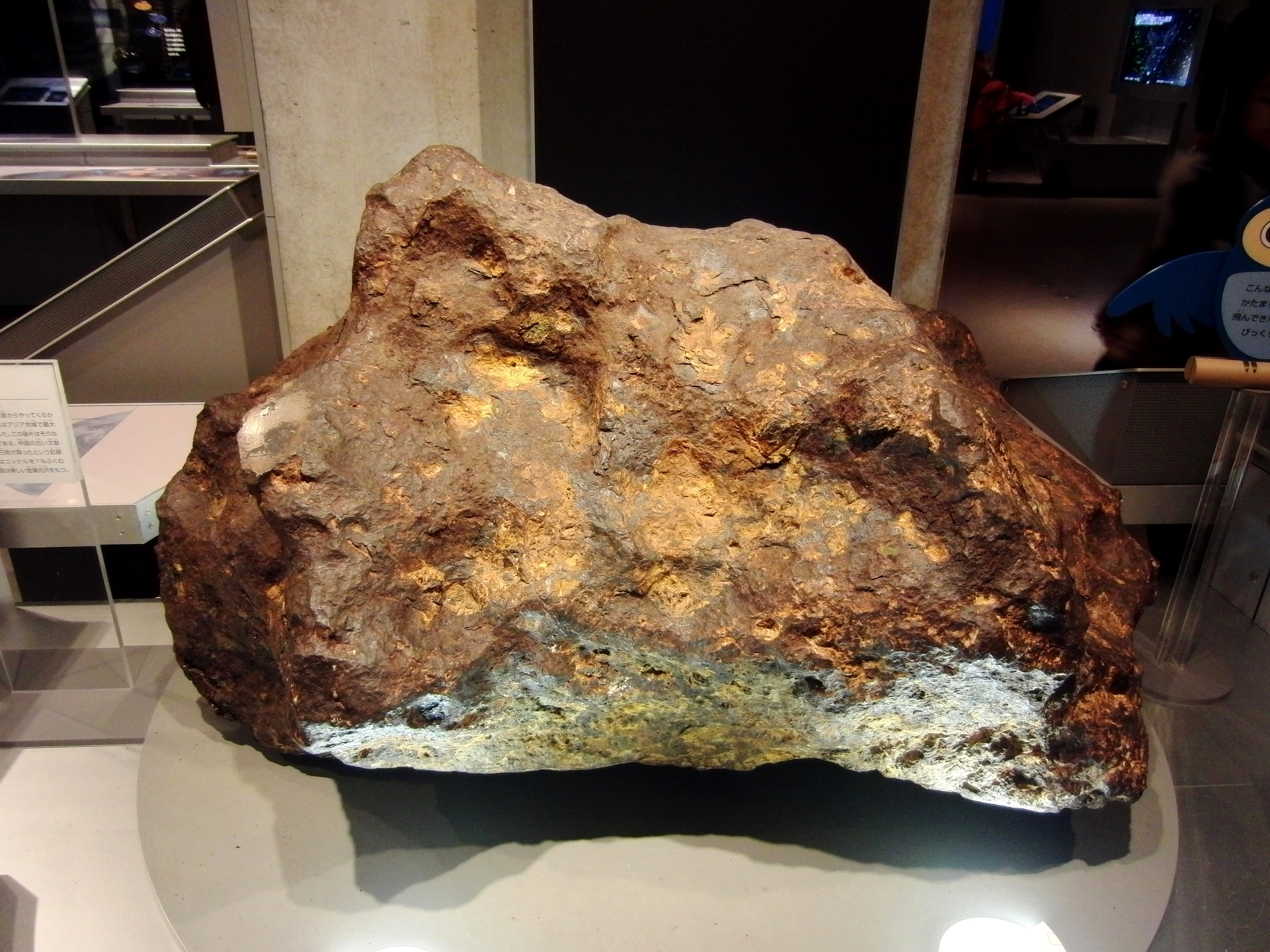
- The largest fragment of Nantan meteorite exhibit in the National Museum of Nature and Science, Tokyo, Japan
- Related media on Wikimedia Commons

The Nantan meteorite is an iron meteorite that belongs to the IAB group and the MG (main group) subgroup.

In 2000, pieces of the meteorite were included in an art installation for The BullRing Shopping Centre in Birmingham, England. A plaque now commemorates the occasion.

As of December 2012, pieces of Nantan meteorite were on sale at US$1/g.

== Discovery ==
The fall of the meteorite might have been observed in 1516, but it is difficult to assess if this event is connected with the pieces that were retrieved in 1958.

The meteorite burst during passage through the atmosphere and the pieces were scattered in a strewn field 28 kilometres (17 mi) long and 8 kilometres (5.0 mi) wide near the city of Nantan, Nandan County, Guangxi (China). The meteorite was named after the city.

The fragments were not retrieved until the 1950s when they were gathered for smelting to make metal for the growing industrialization of China. It was found that the meteoric iron contained too much nickel for smelting.

== Description and Classification ==
The Nantan meteorite was classified as an IIICD in 2000, but was reclassified as an IAB-MG in 2006. 9,500 kilograms (20,900 lb) have been retrieved, the largest fragment having a mass of 2,000 kilograms (4,400 lb). Most fragments show strong signs of weathering, due to the long time it took to retrieve them. The meteoric iron has a Nickel concentration of 6.7%.
