= IIICD meteorite =

Group of primitive achondrites

IIICD meteorites
- — Group —
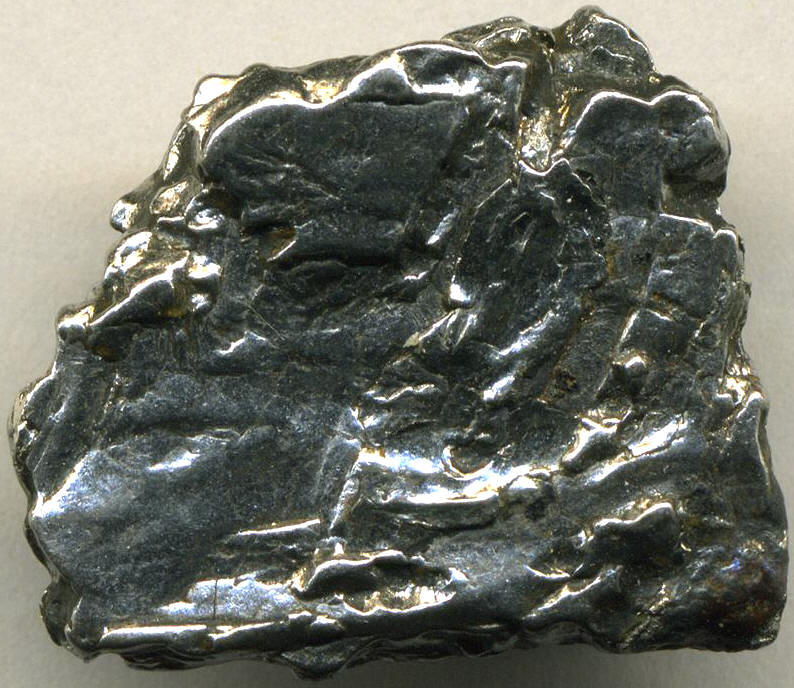
- The Nantan meteorite, an example of an IIICD meteorite
- Type: Achondrite
- Class: Primitive achondrite
- Clan: IAB-IIICD-Winonaite
- Composition: Meteoric iron with silicate inclusions containing low-Ca pyroxene, high-Ca pyroxene, olivine, plagioclase, troilite, graphite, phosphates, meteoric iron, traces of daubréelite & chromite

IIICD meteorites are a group of primitive achondrites. They are classified in a clan together with the IAB meteorites and the winonaites.

== Description ==
IIICD meteorites consists dominantly of meteoric iron with silicate inclusions. The silicate inclusions are almost identical to the IAB meteorite inclusions. They contain low-Ca pyroxene, high-Ca pyroxene, olivine, plagioclase, troilite, graphite, different phosphates, meteoric iron and traces of daubréelite and chromite.

== Parent body ==
It has been established that IAB meteorites and winonaites originated from the same parent body. The same is not yet clear for IIICD meteorites, that originated from the same or a very similar asteroid.

== Classification ==
The IIICD meteorites are classified as primitive achondrites because they have silicate inclusions and show signs of partial melting. The silicate inclusion are almost identical to silicate inclusions in IAB meteorites, and both are very similar to winonaites. For this reason all three are grouped into the IAB-IIICD-Winonaite clan.

== See also ==
- Glossary of meteoritics
