= Winonaite =

Group of primitive achondrite meteorites

Winonaites
- — Group —
- Type: Primitive achondrite
- Subgroups: None
- Parent body: Winonaite-IAB-IIICD
- Total known specimens: 25

Winonaites are a group of primitive achondrite meteorites. Like all primitive achondrites, winonaites share similarities with chondrites and achondrites. They show signs of metamorphism, partial melting, brecciation and relic chondrules. Their chemical and mineralogical composition lies between H and E chondrites.

== Naming and history ==
The winonaite group is named after the type specimen, the Winona meteorite. The name itself derived from Winona, Arizona where the type specimen was said to be found during an archaeological excavation of the Sinagua village Elden Pueblo in September 1928. The Sinagua lived in the village between 1150 and 1275. The meteorite was said to be retrieved from the cist of one of the rooms. However, a later study indicates the meteorite was found at another Sinagua site and not in Elden Pueblo.

As of 2021, 54 meteorites are included in the winonaite group.

== Description ==
Winonaites are achondrites that have a chemical and mineral composition similar to chondrites. Their composition lies between H and E chondrites. Their isotopic ratios are similar to the silicate inclusions in IAB meteorites. In thin section, the mineral grains show microstructures of extensive thermal metamorphism and signs of partial melting. Some winonaite specimen appear to have relics of chondrules (e.g. Pontlyfni and Mount Morris).

== Parent body ==
Winonaites and the two iron meteorite groups IAB and IIICD are thought to be derived from the same parent body. The iron meteorites formed part of the core of the planetesimal and the winonaites were closer to the surface. The reasoning is that the silicate inclusions in IAB meteorites are similar to winonaites, especially in their oxygen isotope ratios. It is less clear whether IIICD meteorites are also part this parent body. The winonaites show that the parent body was affected by impacts that formed breccias of different lithologies. Later these breccias were heated and Ar–Ar radiometric ages have constrained the metamorphism on the parent body to between 4.40 and 4.54 billion years. The parent body also reached temperatures where partial melting took place. Cosmic ray exposure ages show that the meteorites took about 20 to 80 million years to reach earth.

== Notable winonaite meteorites ==
- Hammadah al Hamra 193: Amphibole bearing.
- Pontlyfni: Chondrule relics.
- Mount Morris: Chondrule relics.
- Winona meteorite

== See also ==
- Glossary of meteoritics
