= Lodranite =

Type of meteorites

- — Group —
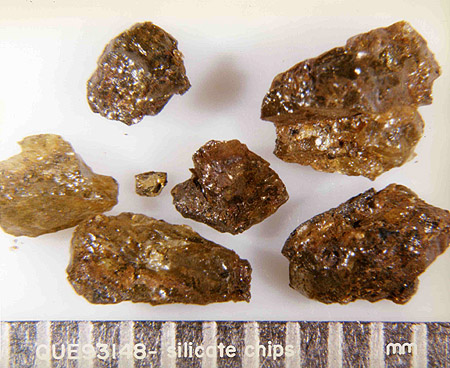
- Lodranite meteorites found at Queen Alexandra Range
- Compositional type: Stony
- Type: Achondrite
- Class: Primitive achondrite
- Composition: Meteoric iron, Olivine, Pyroxene

Lodranites are a small group of primitive achondrite meteorites that consists of meteoric iron and silicate minerals. Olivine and pyroxene make up most of the silicate minerals. Like all primitive achondrites lodranites share similarities with chondrites and achondrites.

== Naming and history ==
The lodranite group is named after Lodhran, Pakistan, where the type specimen fell on 1 October 1868 at 14:00. Eyewitnesses of the fall reported a loud bang accompanied by a rising dust cloud to the east of the city, which led to the discovery and retrieval of the meteorite. The "meteorite from Lodran" was first described by Gustav Tschermak in 1870. He described the meteorite being "apart from the nickel-iron it is an olivine-bronzite aggregates of such outstanding sort, that has never been found in a meteorite before only similar to the terrestrial olivine rock". George Thurland Prior was the first to classify the lodran meteorite as the only member of the lodranite group. He also saw close similarities to the ureilites.

== Description ==
Lodranites are primitive achondrites. They are coarser grained than acapulcoites. The main mineral phases are low calcium pyroxene and olivine with minor amounts of plagioclase and troilite. Because of their composition they are related to the chondrites and H class chondrites. Lodranites can be described as chondrites that were heated to the point where FeNi and FeS reach a eutectic point. At this point partial melting occurred and some of the metal- and silica melt was removed.

The Lodran meteorite is described as having roughly equal amounts of metal, olivine and pyroxene which make up most of the volume. Other minerals include sulphide, chromite, phosphide and chrome-diopside.

== Parent body ==
The lodranites and acapulcoites share the same parent body which was probably similar to an S-type asteroid. The lodranites are coarser grained and yield higher temperatures with isotopic methods and are therefore thought to be from greater depths within the parent body.

The cooling path of the parent body can be reconstructed by using radiometric dating. The Hf-W system in high-Ca pyroxenes has a closing temperature in between 975 and 1025 °C. The parent body cooled under this temperature between 4563.1 and 4562.6 million years ago. This means that the parent body accreted about 1.5 to 2 million years after the CAI formation. Trace elements indicate that the parent body had a complex geologic history with partial melting, melt migration and metasomatism.

== See also ==
- Glossary of meteoritics
