= Goose Lake meteorite =

Meteorite

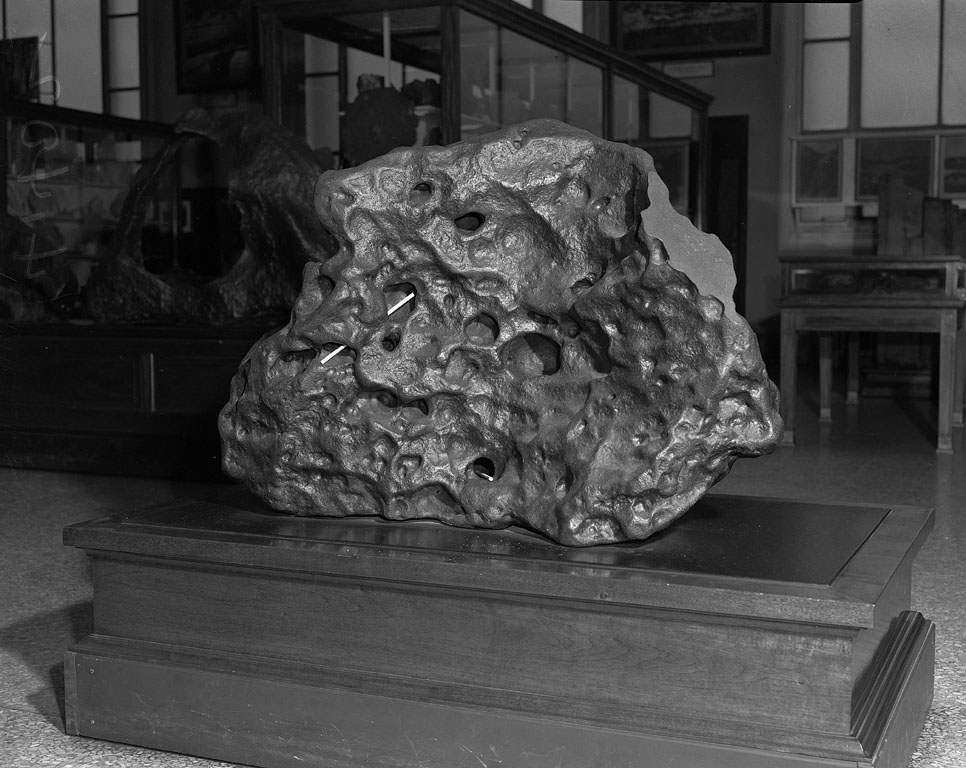
- Goose Lake meteorite on display
- Type: Iron meteorite
- Group: IAB-sLL
- Country: United States
- Coordinates: 41°58′48″N 120°32′30″W
- Observed fall: No
- Found date: 1938-10-13
- TKW: 1,170 kilograms (2,580 lb)
- Related media on Wikimedia Commons

The Goose Lake meteorite is a meteorite that was found at Goose Lake in the United States by two hunters from Oakland, California on October 13, 1938.

In 1939 it was acquired by the United States National Museum. From 1939 until January 14, 1941 it was on exhibition at the Golden Gate International Exposition before moving to Washington, D.C. It was placed on display in the National Museum's meteorite hall until that hall was closed in the 1950s. Today, the meteorite is on display at the National Museum of Natural History.

No crater was left on the ground where it was found, thus meaning that the velocity of the meteorite's impact was minimal.

== See also ==
- Glossary of meteoritics
