= Monturaqui =

Impact crater in Chile

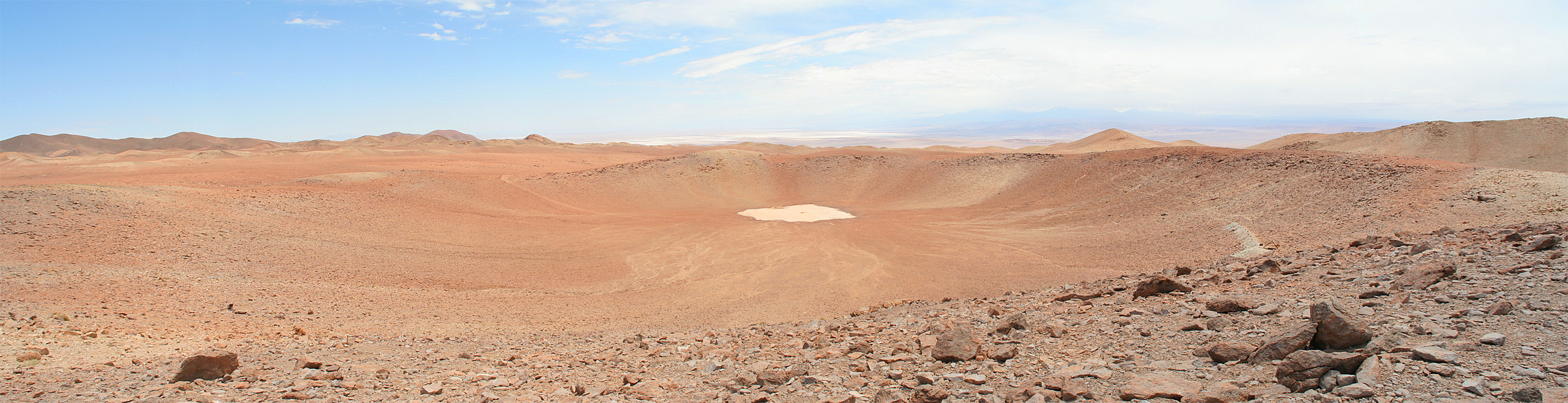

- Location within Chile
- Location: Antofagasta Region, Chile; 23°55′39″S 68°15′42″W

Impact crater structure
- Diameter: 350 m × 370 m (1,150 ft × 1,210 ft)
- Depth: 34 m (112 ft)
- Impactor diameter: 15 m (49 ft)
- Age: 663,000 ± 90,000 years ago
- Exposed: Yes
- Drilled: No
- Bolide type: Group 1 octahedrite

Monturaqui is an impact crater in Chile. It lies south of the Salar de Atacama and was formed 663,000 ± 90,000 years ago by the impact of an IAB meteorite. It is 350 m × 370 m (1,150 ft × 1,210 ft) wide and 34 m (112 ft) deep and contains a salt pan. Only a few remnants of the meteorite that formed the crater have been collected, with most of the rocks being of local origin. The crater was discovered in 1962 and identified as an impact crater in 1966.

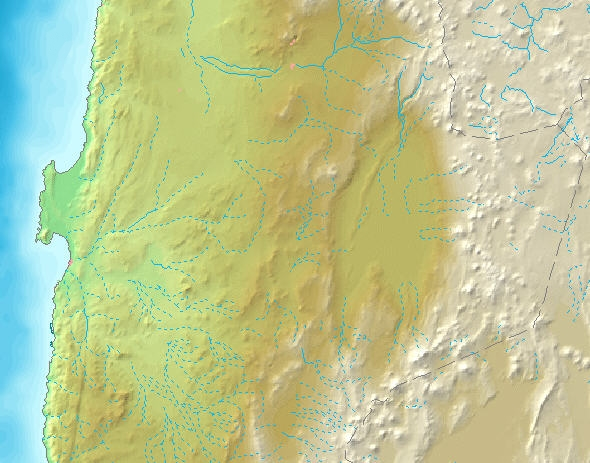
Location of Monturaqui crater

== Human history ==
The crater was first suspected to be an impact crater in 1962, when it was found on aerial images. After geologic research on the site found evidence of the impact event, it was identified as an impact crater in 1966. The crater has not been drilled. Its name is derived from the mountain range where it is located and from the town of Monturaqui 70 km (43 mi). The closest town is Peine, 35 km (22 mi) northeast of the crater.

An old Inca road, which goes from the Pacific Ocean to San Pedro de Atacama and further to Argentina, runs 100–200 m (330–660 ft) from the crater. The crater has been deemed by Stanislav Kaniansky and Kristian Molnár to be one of the "most impressive" in the world and has a high scenic and historical value. The Chilean Geological Society has defined it as one of the geosites of Chile, although such a classification has no legal effect and the crater is threatened by erosion caused by vehicles and the over-collection of rocks. In 2017, several Chilean organizations and the community of Peine petitioned the Chilean government to declare the site a historic monument. Monturaqui crater is a tourist attraction in the area, which has led to the removal of meteoritic rocks and damage to the crater.

== Geography and geomorphology ==
Monturaqui lies in a remote region of the Atacama Desert south of the Salar de Atacama, in the "precordillera". The city of Antofagasta lies 200 km (120 mi) northwest of the crater. Administratively, the crater is in the Antofagasta Region.

Monturaqui is a nearly circular, well-preserved 350 m × 370 m (1,150 ft × 1,210 ft) wide and 34 m (112 ft) deep impact crater. It has the shape of a bowl and is elongated in northwest–southeast direction. The height of its rim ranges between 16–48 m (52–157 ft) with the southern rim being about 10–15 m (33–49 ft) higher than the northern. Sedimentation in rain-fed ponds has left a 40 m^{2} (430 sq ft) playa in the crater, which lies in its northeastern quadrant and is surrounded by lake sediments. Bushes grow close to the salt pan deposits and it could be considered a "salt pan oasis". The dry climate (the annual precipitation is less than 1 mm (0.039 in)) means that water in the crater tends to evaporate. A magnetic anomaly is associated with the crater.

It is located at about 3,015 m (9,892 ft) elevation. The terrain in the area consists of Paleozoic granites that are covered by Pliocene ignimbrites, and slopes northward to the Salar de Atacama, thus explaining the tilt of the crater. Dykes cut through the granitic units, and both ignimbrites and granites are faulted. The impact primarily affected the granitic units but both units are apparent in the crater walls and the ignimbrites cover the rim crest.

== Impact event ==
The impact has been dated with radiometric dating to have occurred about 663,000 ± 28,000 years ago. Various surface exposure dating techniques yield ages of about 500,000–780,000 years. Since then, erosion has altered the crater by depositing fluvial and mass wasting deposits in it, gullying its sides and by lowering the rim. Originally, the Monturaqui crater was connected with the Campo del Cielo or the Rio Cuarto impact structures in Argentina. Some theories have linked the timing of impact to orbital cycles.

The meteorite probably hit from the northwest at an angle of 41° and was travelling at a velocity of about 15 km/s (9.3 mi/s). Because of the elevation at which it hit the ground, the meteorite had traversed only a little more than half the atmosphere and thus had not lost as much mass as it would have had it hit ground at sea level. The impact heated the ground to temperatures exceeding 1,400 °C (2,550 °F), probably reaching 1,500–1,600 °C (2,730–2,910 °F), and had an energy comparable to that of 2.2 Hiroshima bombs. The formation of the crater disrupted the local drainage network, which redeveloped to run around the crater.

=== Impactor ===
The impacting body was a metallic asteroid containing iron and nickel. It has been identified as a group I octahedrite and as an IAB meteorite with a size of about 15 m (49 ft).

=== Impact products ===
The impact has produced rocks such as impact glass, coesite and shocked quartz; some rocks were completely melted during the impact and others were turned to glass. Impact-generated rocks formed mostly from granite and meteorite material. They are mostly found at the east-southeast side of the crater, with lesser amounts on its inside.

Only a few or no fragments of the meteorite have been recovered. Given the proximity of the crater to an old road, this may be due to traders and herdsmen removing meteorite fragments but it may also be due to the metals being oxidized over time. They include rocks called "iron shale", they are magnetic indicating their origin in the meteorite.

The nonoxidized parts consist of cohenite, rabdite, schreibersite and taenite. Other minerals are goethite, lepidocrocite, maghemite, pentlandite and reevesite. Metallic spherules occur. Fragments of the Monturaqui meteorite have been collected in the meteorite collection of "Giorgio Abetti" Astronomical Observatory and Museum, San Giovanni in Persiceto, Bologna, Italy.

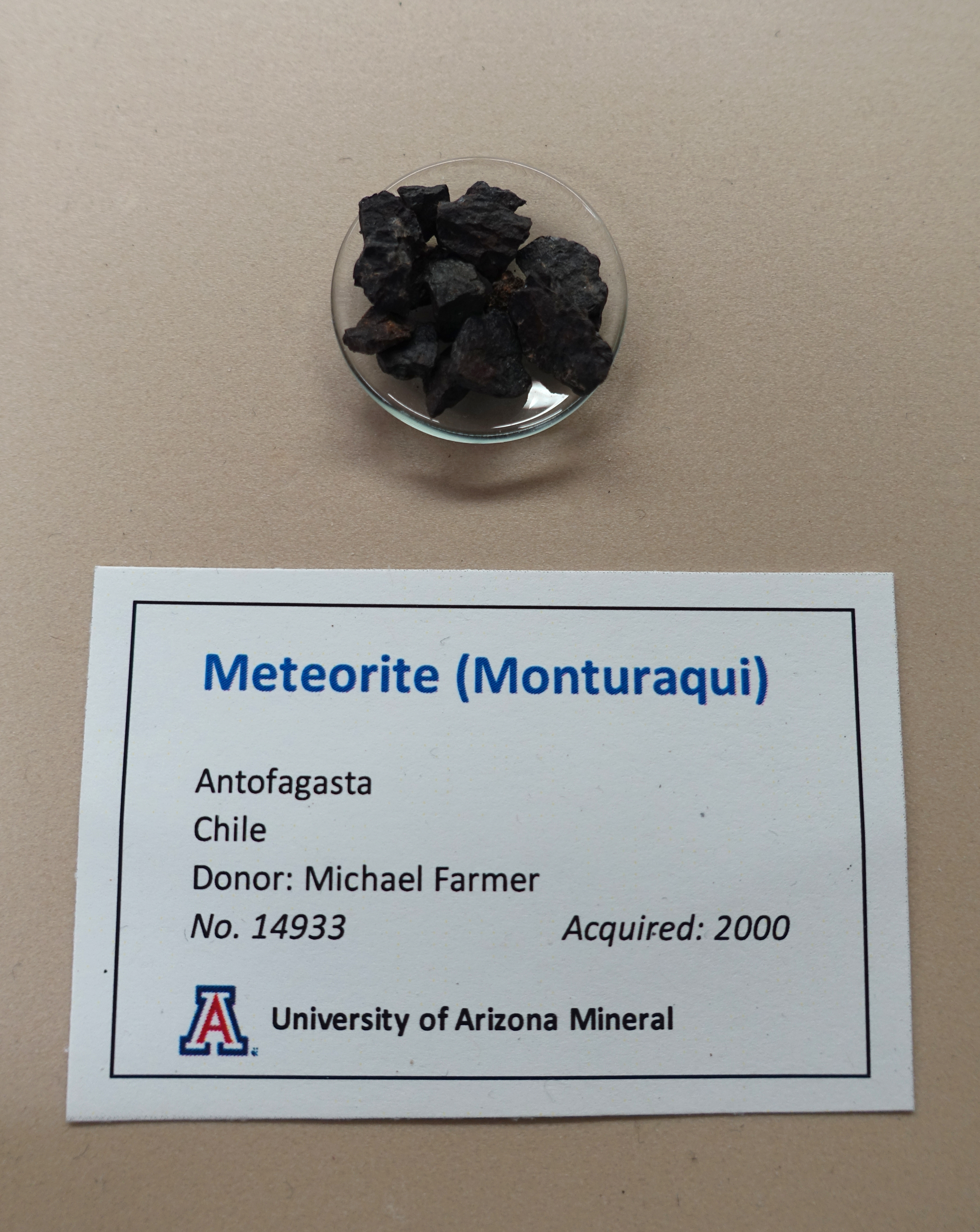

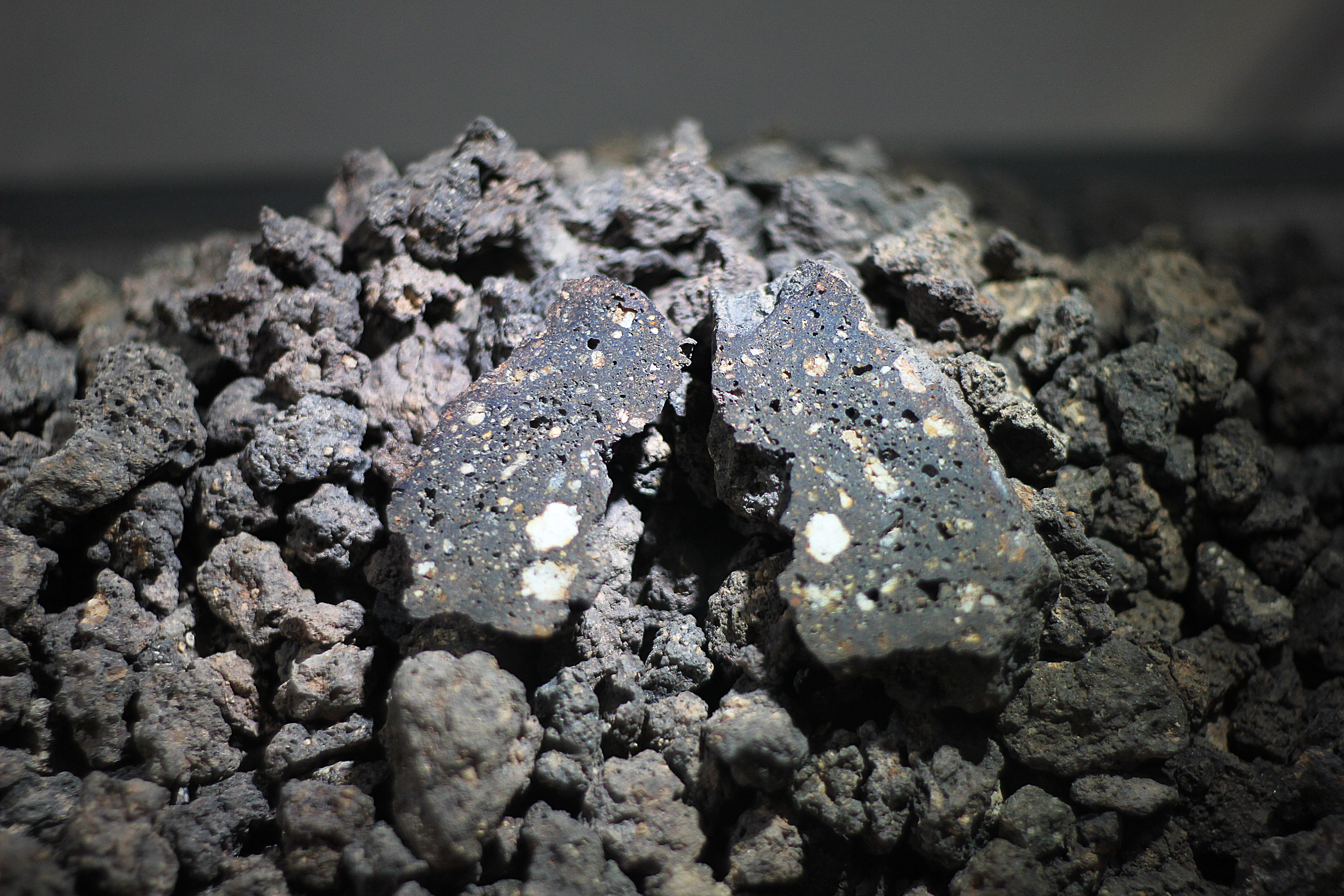
