= Dar al Gani =

Meteorite field in the Libyan Sahara

Coordinates: 27°15′N 16°15′E

The Dar al Gani (also known as DaG) is a meteorite field in the Libyan Sahara. The site is a plateau of limestone, about 200 kilometres (120 mi) long and 60 kilometres (37 mi) at its widest.

Dark-colored meteorites can be easily spotted in this field, where they have also been well preserved due to the arid climate, and favorable geology consisting of basic rocks (clays, dolomites, and limestones) and lacking erosive quartz sand.

As of July 2001, 869 meteorites with a total weight of 687 kilograms (1,515 lb) were retrieved from the site; the largest weighed 95 kilograms (209 lb).

The name Dar al Gani was given by the nomenclature committee of the Meteoritical Society. It does not exist in the National Atlas of Libya. However, the name Dur al Ghani was given to part of the Sarir al Qattusah plateau in the geological map of Libya.

== See also ==
- Glossary of meteoritics
