= Brachinite =

Group of meteorites

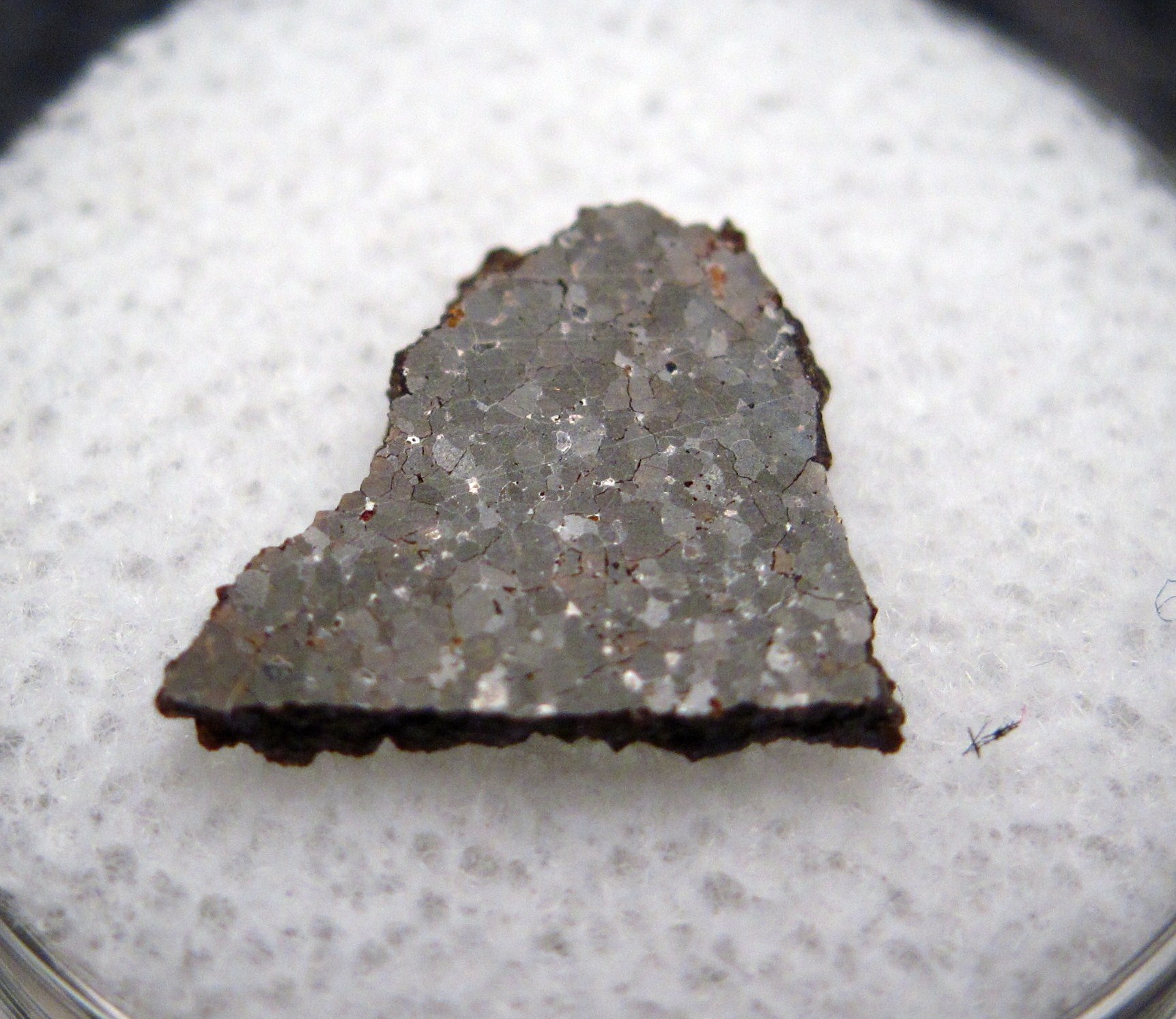
Slice of the Northwest Africa 3151 meteorite.

Brachinites are a group of meteorites that are classified either as primitive achondrites or as asteroidal achondrites. Like all primitive achondrites, they have similarities with chondrites and achondrites. Brachinites contain 74 to 98% (volume) olivine. They are a type of peridotite belonging to the wehrlite class.

== Naming and history ==
Brachinites are named after the Brachina meteorite, the type specimen of this group, which in turn is named after Brachina, South Australia.

== Description ==
Brachinites consist almost entirely of olivine (74 to 98% by volume). Other minerals include plagioclase (6.7 to 12.9%), iron sulfides (1.8 to 4.0%), clinopyroxene (1.5 to 8.2%) and orthopyroxene (0 to 2.4%). Trace minerals include phosphates and meteoritic iron. The only deviation from chondrites is the very high olivine/orthopyroxene ratio.

== Specimens ==
As of 2022, there were 56 meteorites classified as brachinites. A notable example is the type specimen, the Brachina meteorite.

== See also ==
- Glossary of meteoritics
