= Acapulcoite =

Group of the primitive achondrite class of meteorites

- — Group —
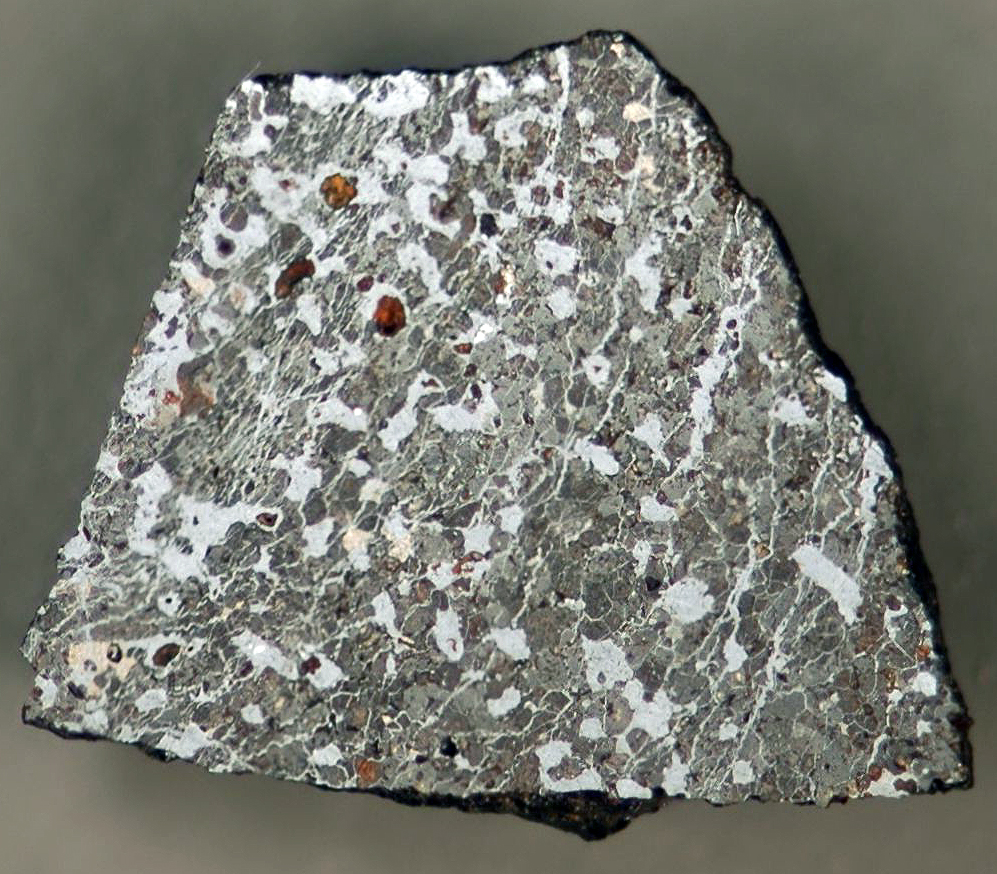
- NWA 2989, an example of an acapulcoite meteorite
- Type: Achondrite
- Structural classification: ?
- Class: Primitive achondrite
- Subgroups: None?
- Parent body: Unknown
- Composition: Olivine, orthopyroxene, plagioclase, meteoric iron, troilite
- Total known specimens: Fifty two
- Alternative names: Acapulcoites, Acapulcoite group, Acapulcoite meteorites

Acapulcoites are a group of the primitive achondrite class of stony meteorites.

== Naming and history ==
The acapulcoites are named after the only specimen of the group that was a witnessed fall. The Acapulco meteorite fell on 11 August 1976 at 11:00 near El Quemado Colony (16.883°N 99.9°W), outside Acapulco, Guerrero, Mexico. The stone was retrieved 15 minutes afterwards from a 30 centimetres (12 in) deep crater and was cool to the touch. It had a mass of 1,914 grams (67.5 oz). Following that discovery, more than 90 meteorite specimens have been classified as acapulcoites.

== Chemical composition ==
Acapulcoites are primarily composed of olivine, orthopyroxene, plagioclase, meteoric iron, and troilite.

Like all primitive achondrites, acapulcoites have chemical composition and mineralogical similarities with chondrites, and some specimens even show relict chondrules. Their mineral composition lies between H and E chondrites.

== See also ==
- Glossary of meteoritics
