= Elden Pueblo =

Prehistoric feature in Coconino County, Arizona

Coordinates: 35°14′33″N 111°34′05″W

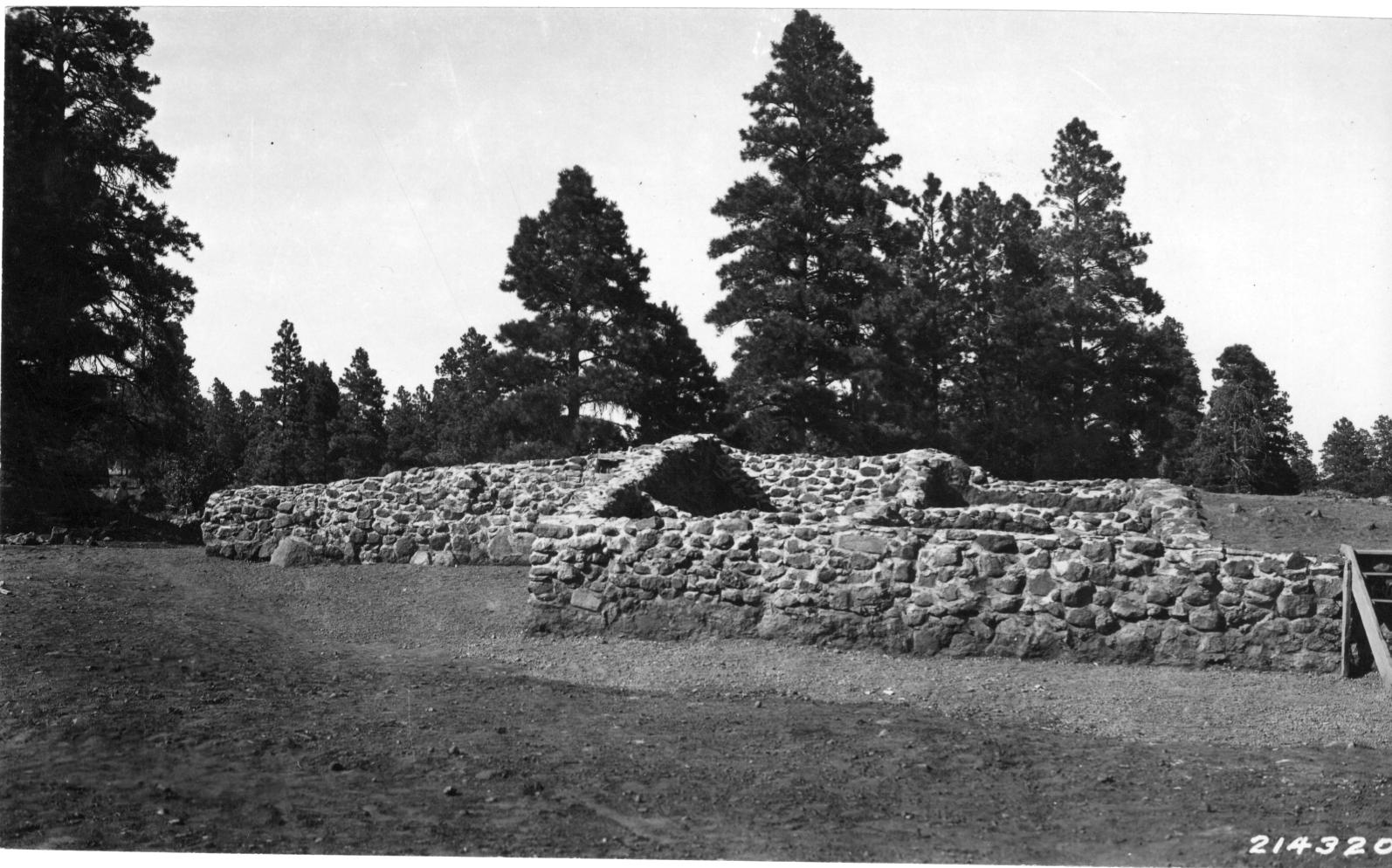
Ruins of Elden Pueblo, 1926. Photo courtesy Coconino National Forest.

Elden Pueblo (Hopi: Pasiwvi) was a prehistoric Native American village at the foot of Mount Elden near Flagstaff, Arizona. The pueblo is considered part of a major trading system. Various trade items, such as macaw skeletons from Mexico and shell jewelry from the coast of California, have been found throughout the site. The area is now protected and is used for research and educational purposes.

== History ==
The area was settled by the Sinagua people from approximately 1070 to 1275. The site was believed to be home to 200–300 people within 60–70 rooms. Aside from the structures constructed of compacted stones, a burial mound was discovered near the site. Two individual burials were found under the site.

The site was discovered by Mary-Russell Ferrell Colton. Her husband Harold Colton originally named it Sheep Hill Pueblo. When Jesse Walter Fewkes excavated it in 1926 and shipped the recovered skeletons and pots to the Smithsonian, it created a controversy among Arizona's archaeologists, including Colton and Byron Cummings of the University of Arizona. Colton and Fewkes sparred in Science and various outraged Arizona newspapers. The controversy was part of the impetus for the 1927 Arizona Antiquities Act and the creation of the Northern Arizona Society of Science and Art.

There is some controversy about the burial mound; some say the mound is simply a dirt pile from the nearby Fewkes' excavation. Ruins from another structure were also found underneath the mound, leading to questions about its authenticity.

Archaeological studies have uncovered information regarding architectural design and the social hierarchy of the Sinagua people Social hierarchy can be deduced from the variations in burial techniques as well as the decorative features of the grave.

Although it has been stated that the Winona meteorite was found at Elden Pueblo, it was found at another Sinagua site miles away.
