= Aristides Brezina =

Austrian mineralogist (1848–1909)

- Born: 4 May 1848
- Died: 25 May 1909 (aged 61)
- Citizenship: Austrian
- Education: University of Tübingen (1872)
- Occupation: Mineralogist
- Known for: Co-architect of the "Rose-Tschermak-Brezina classification" system for meteorites

Aristides Brezina (4 May 1848 – 25 May 1909) was an Austrian mineralogist born in Vienna.

In 1872 he graduated from the University of Tübingen, and afterwards taught crystallography at the University of Vienna. In 1878 he succeeded Austrian mineralogist Gustav Tschermak (1836-1927) as custodian of the meteorite collection at Vienna, and from 1889 until 1896 he was director of the Mineralogisch-Petrographische Abteilung (Department of Mineralogy-Petrography). In 1886, he was elected as a member to the American Philosophical Society.

Brezina is known for his study of meteorites, and with German mineralogist Gustav Rose (1798-1873) and Tschermak, he was co-architect of the "Rose-Tschermak-Brezina classification" system for meteorites. It was largely based on criteria such as texture and color, and was widely used from the mid-1880s to around 1920 when a simpler method of classification was proposed by George Thurland Prior.

Brezinaite, a mineral found in meteorites, is named after him.

== Bibliography ==
- Brezina, Aristides (1882). Meteoritenstudien II.: Über die Orientierung der Schnittflächen an Eisenmeteroriten mittelst der Widmannstädten'schen Figuren, Band 44 (in German). p. 158.
- Brezina, Aristides (1882). Über die Reichenbach'schen Lamellen in Meteoreisen. K.K. Hof- und Staatsdruckerei. p. 4.
- Brezina, Aristides (1885). Die Meteoritensammlung des K. K. Mineralogischen Hofkabinetes in Wien: am 1. Mai 1885; mit vier Tafeln (in German). Hölder. pp. 126.
- Brezina, Aristides (1886). Die Struktur und Zusammensetzung der Meteoreisen: erläutert durch photographische Abbildungen geätzter Schnittflächen (in German). E. Schweizerbart'sche Verlagshandlung.
- Brezina, Aristides (1892). Die zwei hochorientirten Meteoreisen: von Hraschina bei Agram (gefallen 26. Mai 1791) und Cabin Creek, Arkansas (gefallen 27. März 1886) (in German). p. 4.
- Brezina, Aristides; Emil Wilhelm Cohen (1886). Lithosiderite und Oktaedrite mit feinsten und feinen Lamellen (in German). p. 18.
- Aristides, Brezina (1895). Über Gefüge und Zusammensetzung der Meteoriten: Vortrag, gehalten den 19. December 1894 (in German). Selbstverlag des Vereines zur Verbreitung naturwissenschaftlicher Kenntnisse. p. 36.
- Brezina, Aristides; José A. y Bonilla (1896). Die Meteoritensammlung des K. K. Naturhistorischen Hofmuseums am 1. Mai 1895: Mit zwei Anhängen (in German). Wien: A. Hölder, K. und K. Hof- und Universitäts-Buchändler. p. 370.
- Brezina, Aristides (1896). Die Meteoritensammlung der Universität Tübingen (in German).
- Brezina, A. (1904), "The Arrangement of Collections of Meteorites", Proceedings of the American Philosophical Society, Vol.43, No.176, (April 1904), pp.211-247. JSTOR 983506
- Brezina, Aristides (1909). Der Meteorsteinfall zu Mern, von Dr. Aristides Brezina (in German). B. Lunos Bogtrykkeri. p. 15.

== See also ==
- Glossary of meteoritics
- "The New Museum Idea"
