= Desert glass =

Desert glass may refer to:

- Libyan desert glass, in Egypt and Libya
- Atacama desert glass, in Chile
- Edeowie glass, in South Australia
- Darwin glass, in West Coast, Tasmania
- Fulgurite, lumps of glass formed by lightning
- Trinitite, a more specialised subclass is that formed during a nuclear explosion
