= Ataxite =

Structural class of iron meteorites

- — Structural class —
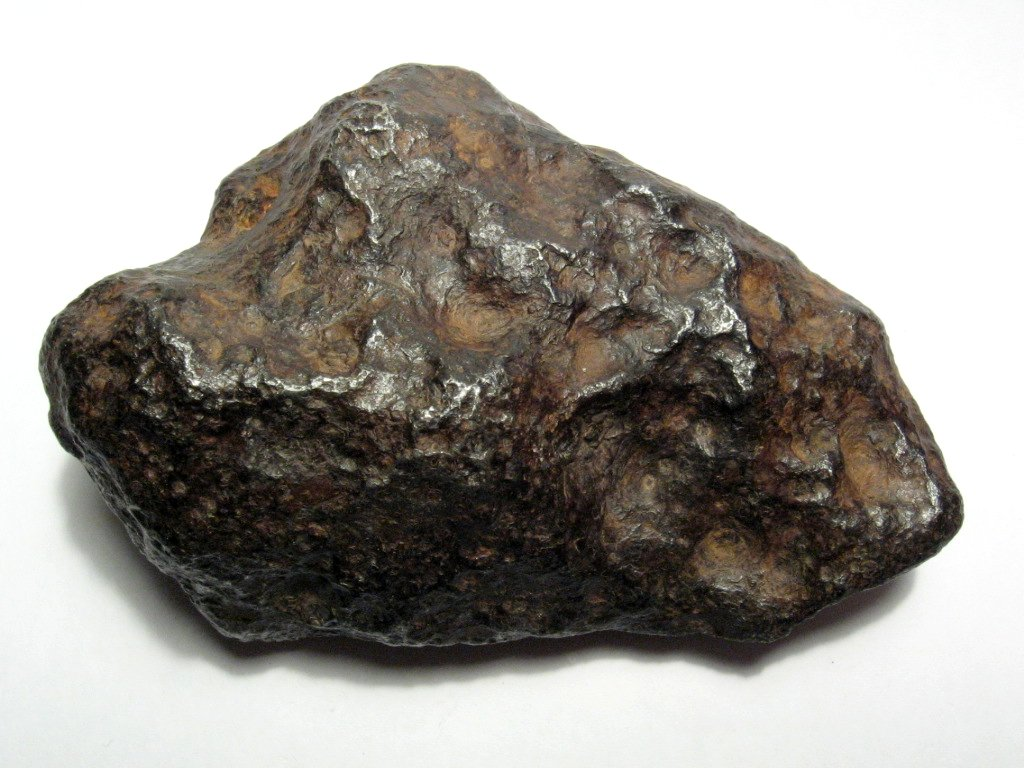
- The Chinga meteorite is an ataxite.
- Group: IVB or "Iron, ungrouped", occasionally IAB or others
- Composition: Mainly Meteoric iron, nickel (>18%), no Widmanstätten patterns
- A phase diagram showing the link between structural and chemical classification.

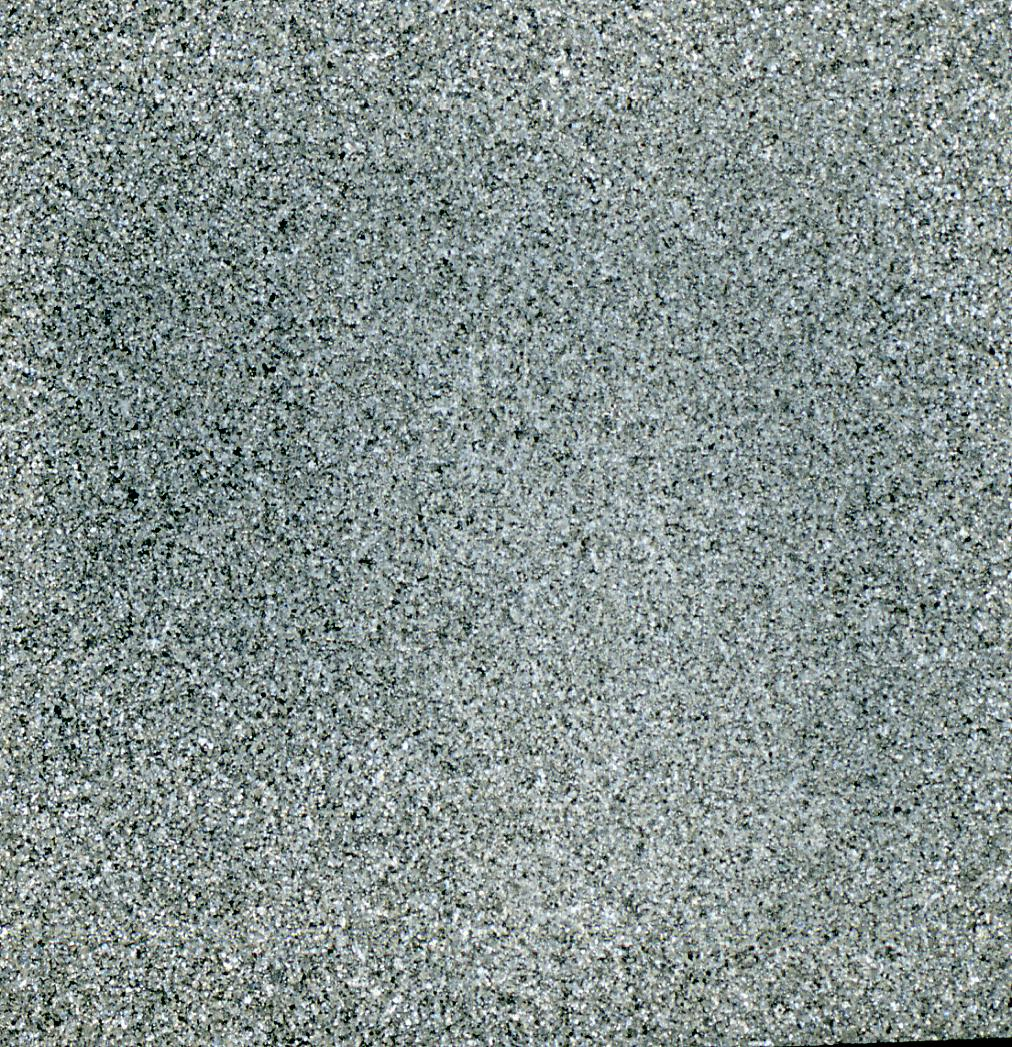
The Santiago Papasquiero meteorite, an ataxite found in 1958 in Durango, Mexico. It consists of a finely crystalline mix of kamacite & taenite, plus other minor minerals. Santiago Papasquiero is a strange ataxite that appears to be a completely metamorphosed and recrystallized octahedrite. Field of view ~2.5 cm across. This is a cut, polished, nitric acid-etched surface.

Ataxites (from Greek meaning "without structure") are a structural class of iron meteorites with a high nickel content and show no Widmanstätten patterns upon etching.

== Characteristics ==
Ataxites are composed mainly of meteoric iron, a native metal found in meteorites that consists of the mineral taenite with minor amounts of plessite, troilite, and microscopic lamellae of kamacite. Ataxites are the most nickel-rich meteorites known; they usually contain over 18% nickel. The high nickel content is the reason that they do not develop a Widmanstätten structure, because in this case kamacite can be exsolved from taenite only at such a low temperature (below about 600°C) where diffusion is already too slow.

== Classification ==
Most ataxites belong to the IVB group or are classified as "Iron, ungrouped" because they do not fit in any of the groups currently recognized by meteorite classification. Some ataxites belong to the IAB group and fall into the sHL (high-Au, low-Ni subgroup), sLH (low-Au, high-Ni subgroup), sHH (high-Au, high-Ni subgroup) and "ung" subgroup (does not fit any subgroup of IAB). Only a couple of ataxites have been classified into the IAB complex and the IIF, IVA, IIAB, IIIAB groups.

== Abundance ==
They are a rare class, with none of the about 50 observed iron meteorite falls being an ataxite; however, the largest meteorite ever found, the 60-ton Hoba meteorite (discovered 1920 in Namibia), belongs to this class. A Tibetan Buddhist statue, the Iron Man, was likely carved from an ataxite meteorite, and may have been made from a fragment of the Chinga meteorite. Other examples of ataxites are the Dronino meteorite and pieces of the Gebel Kamil.

== See also ==
- Glossary of meteoritics
