= Ureilite =

Rare type of stony meteorite

- — Group —
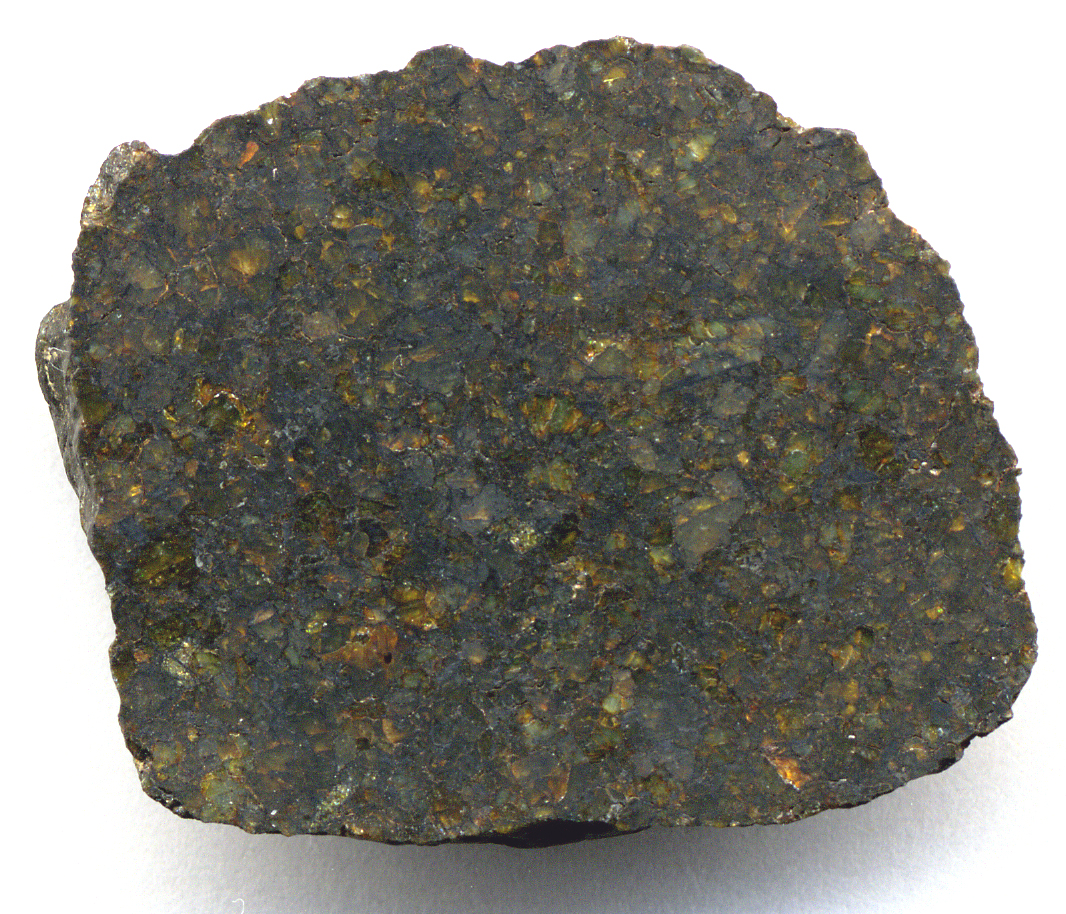
- NWA 4231, an example of an ureilite meteorite
- Compositional type: Stony
- Type: Achondrite
- Class: Primitive achondrite
- Subgroups: monomict; polymict
- Parent body: Unknown (F-type?)
- Composition: Olivine-pigeonite

Ureilite is a rare type of stony meteorite that has a unique mineralogical composition very different from that of other stony meteorites. This dark grey or brownish meteorite type is named after the village Novy Urey (Cyrillic: Новый Урей), Mordovia Republic of Russia, where a meteorite of this type fell on 4 September 1886. Notable ureilites are the Novo Urei and the Goalpara, also named for the town in which it landed (Goalpara, Assam India). On 7 October 2008, tiny asteroid 2008 TC_{3} entered Earth's atmosphere and exploded an estimated 37 kilometres (23 mi) above the Nubian Desert in Sudan. Fragments of this asteroid were recovered the following December and were found to be ureilite. Scientists have discovered amino acids in meteorite 2008 TC_{3} where none were expected, taking into account high temperatures reached in the explosion of about 1000 °C.

== Composition ==
Ureilites are achondrite meteorites rich in olivine and pigeonite. Ureilites can be divided into two subcategories: monomict and polymict. Monomict ureilites are coarse-grained, with olivine usually more abundant than pyroxene. Polymict ureilites are a mixture of clasts of dissimilar composition.

Compared to most other meteorites, ureilites have a high abundance of carbon (average 3% by weight), which is in the form of graphite and nanodiamonds. The nanodiamonds, which are rarely more than a few micrometres in diameter, are probably the result of high pressure shockwaves produced by collisions of the ureilite parent body with other asteroids.

== Origin ==
Unknown. Some groups of meteorites come from a single object (i.e. Mars, Moon, 4 Vesta), but no parent body has been found for the ureilites. Before impacting Earth 2008 TC_{3} was identified as an F-type asteroid.

One theory suggests that ureilites were formed in the interior of a parent body with cumulate crystals that formed crystal layers. Support for this comes from some ureilites in which the grains are aligned in a preferred orientation. Another suggestion is that ureilites represent a residuum of unmelted material after a partial melt liquid was drawn off. Yet other ideas are that they are unprocessed materials which never melted or that they are mixtures of carbonaceous chondrite and basaltic rock melts. It remains unclear whether ureilites originated on different parent bodies or in different regions of a single body. The presence of diamonds, which can form from graphite as a result of severe shock metamorphism, hints at a violent impact history. By contrast, a 2018 study of the diamond inclusions in 2008 TC_{3} concluded that they could only have formed over a relatively long period of time at high pressure, suggesting that "the ureilite parent body was a Mercury- to Mars-sized planetary embryo."

== See also ==
- Glossary of meteoritics
- Meteorite classification
