= Meteorite find =

Meteorite that was found by people, but whose fall was not observed

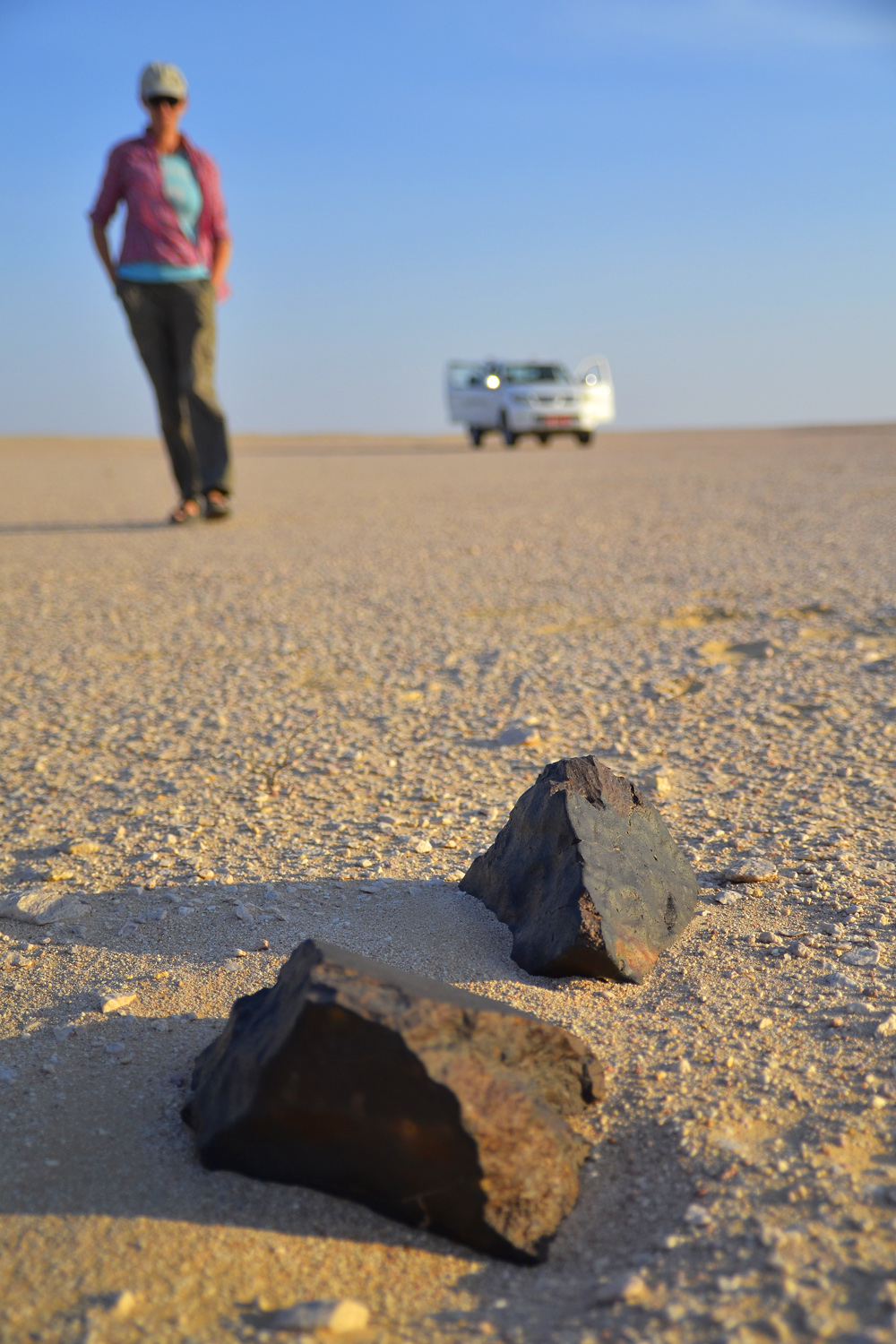
A search for meteorites in the Dhofar Desert in the Arabian Peninsula (Dhofar Governorate, Oman, November 2012)

A meteorite find is a meteorite that was found by people, but whose fall was not observed. They may have been on Earth's surface for thousands of years and therefore could have been subject to varying amounts of weathering.

Finds are distinguished from "meteorite falls", which were observed during their descent and collected shortly afterwards.

All officially recognized meteorites are listed in databases such as the Meteoritical Bulletin Database, and most have specimens in modern collections.

== See also ==
- Glossary of meteoritics
- Category:Meteorites by find location
