= Strewn field =

Area where meteorites from a single fall, or tektites, are dispersed

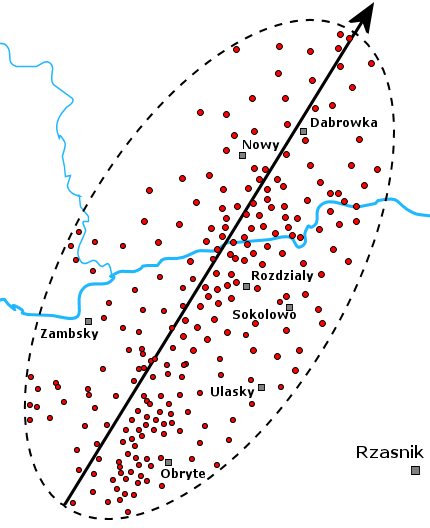
Example of meteorite strewnfield: distribution ellipse of Pultusk meteorite

A strewn field is the area where meteorites from a single fall are dispersed. It is also often used for the area containing tektites produced by a large meteorite impact.

== Formation ==
There are two strewnfield formation mechanisms:

1. Mid-air fragmentation: when a large meteoroid enters the atmosphere it often fragments into many pieces before touching the ground due to thermal shock. This mid-air explosion disperses material over a large oval-shaped area. The long axis of this oval is along the flight path of the meteoroid. When multiple-explosions occur, the material can be found in several overlapping ovals.
2. Impact fragmentation: when there is almost no mid-air fragmentation the fragmentation can occur upon impact. In this case the strewnfield shape can be different, usually circular. Examples include the strewn fields of the Canyon Diablo meteorite which formed Meteor Crater in Arizona, and the Australasian strewnfield.

== Fragment distribution ==
In the case of mid-air fragmentation, smaller fragments tend to fall shorter and the biggest fragments are usually found at the far end of the oval. In order to get an idea of the original flight direction it is necessary to analyze the size pattern of the material over the strewnfield. Fragments of about 1 to 5 grams can be picked up on weather radar as they fall at terminal velocity.

== See also ==
- Glossary of meteoritics
