= Primitive achondrite =

Subdivision of meteorites

Primitive achondrites
- — Class —
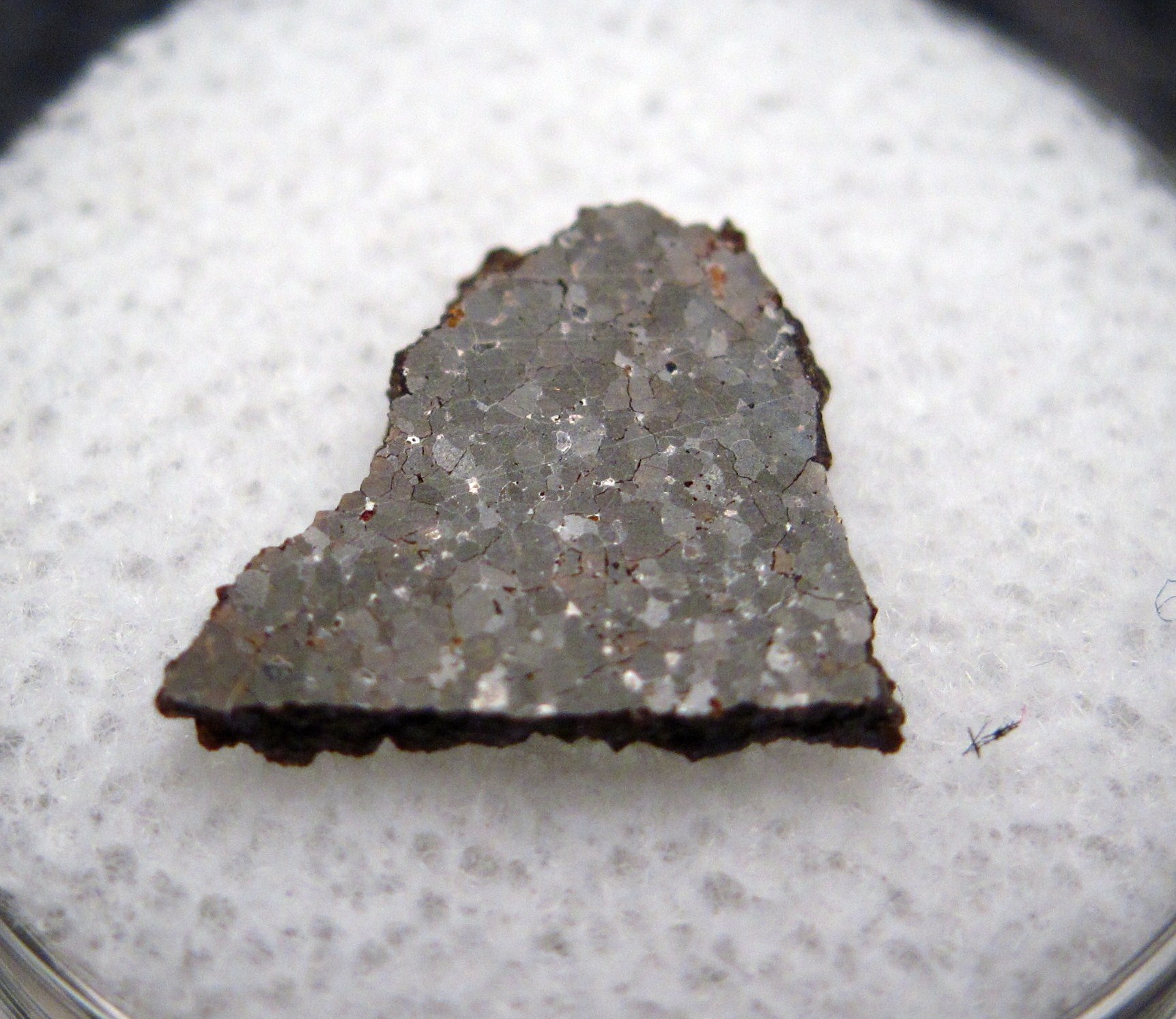
- Slice of a brachinite meteorite (Northwest Africa 3151)
- Type: Achondrite
- Subgroups: Ureilite; Brachinite; Acapulcoite; Lodranite; Winonaite; IAB; IIICD
- Parent body: Various
- Composition: Heterogeneous

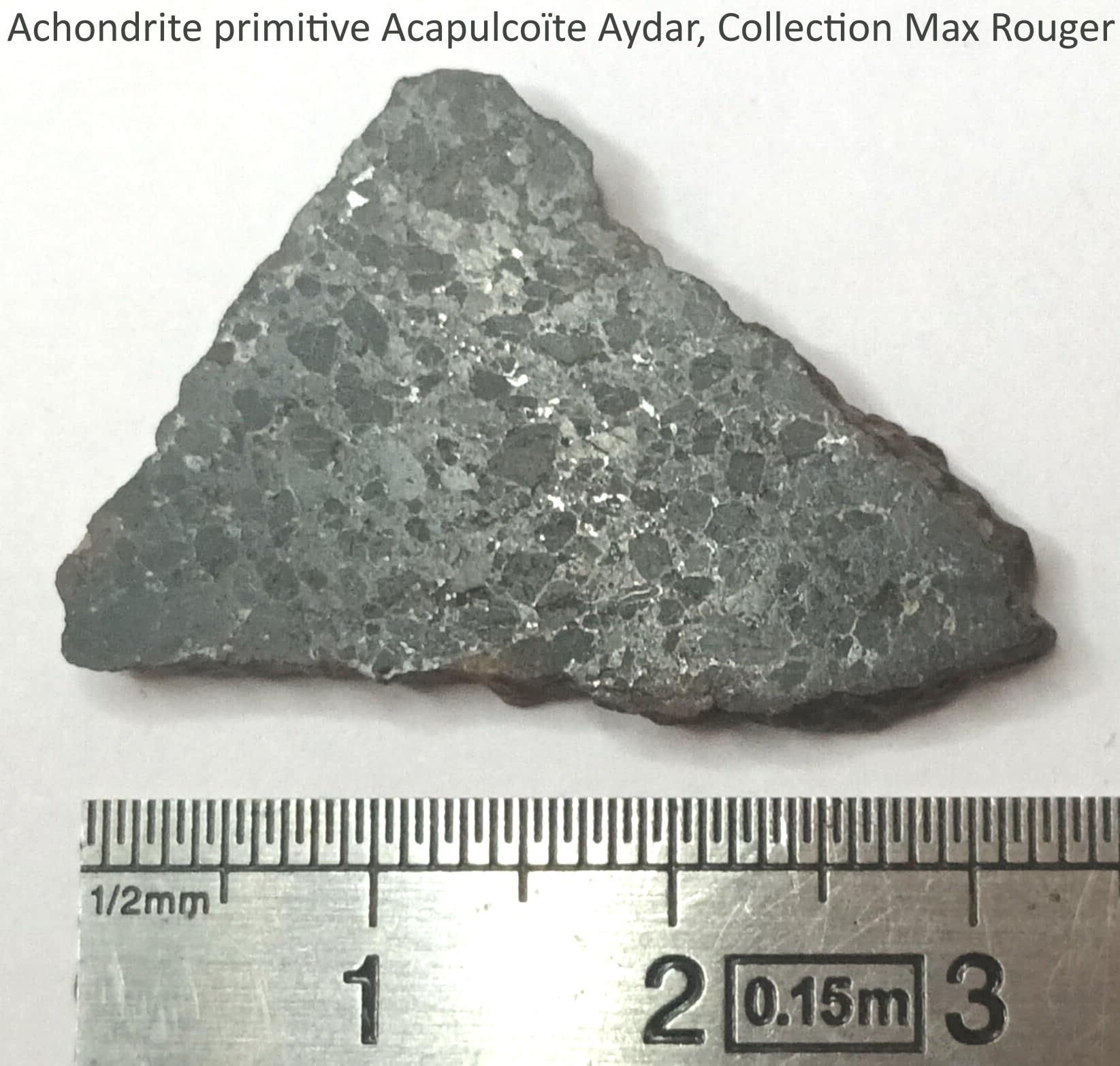
Slice of 4.41 grams of the Aydar meteorite, an acapulcoite.

Primitive achondrites are a subdivision of meteorites. They are classified on the same rank (historically called "Class") and lying between chondrites and achondrites. They are called primitive because they are achondrites that have retained much of their original chondritic properties. Very characteristic are relic chondrules and chemical compositions close to the composition of chondrites. These observations are explained as melt residues, partial melting, or extensive recrystallization.

== History ==
The concept of primitive achondrites was first summarized in 1983.

In 2006 a classification was published that assigned 7 groups to the primitive achondrites, but the classification remains controversial. The authors define primitive achondrites as meteorites "that exceeded their solidus temperature on the parent body" and thus would partially melt. Meteorites that have been fully melted are included if they did not reach isotopic equilibrium on their parent body.

== Description ==
There are many indicators why some achondrites are deemed primitive. Some contain relic chondrules (e.g. Acapulcoite, Lodranite) and some have oxygen isotope ratios that are similar to chondrites. There are similarities in trace element concentrations between primitive achondrites and chondrites. A textural indicator can be observed in petrographic thin sections. If an achondrite is primitive it formed through recrystallization and will have many 120° grain boundaries. Normal achondrites form by crystallizing from a magma and will show magmatic textures.

Lodranites are for example seen as residues of partial melting, while acapulcoites are seen as partial melts, but both were produced by partial melting. Ureileites and brachinites remain uncertain and could either be explained as residues or cumulates.

== Subdivisions ==
The following groups are assigned to the primitive achondrites:

- Ureilite group
- Brachinite group
- Acapulcoite group
- Lodranite group
- Winonaite group
- IAB group
- IIICD group

== See also ==
- Glossary of meteoritics
