= Achondrite =

Stony meteorite that does not contain chondrules

- — Type —
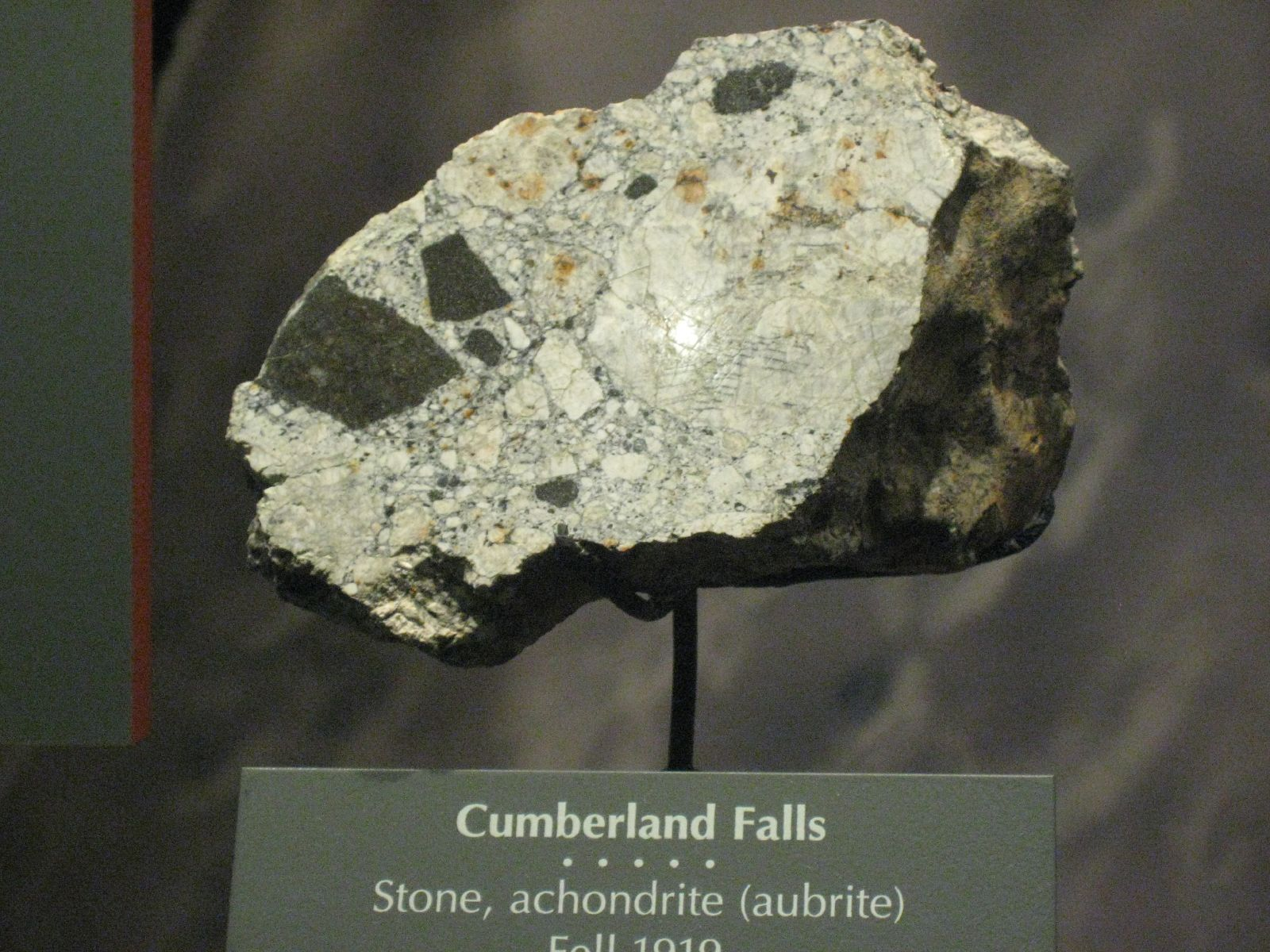
- Cumberland Falls, achondrite (aubrite)
- Compositional type: Stony
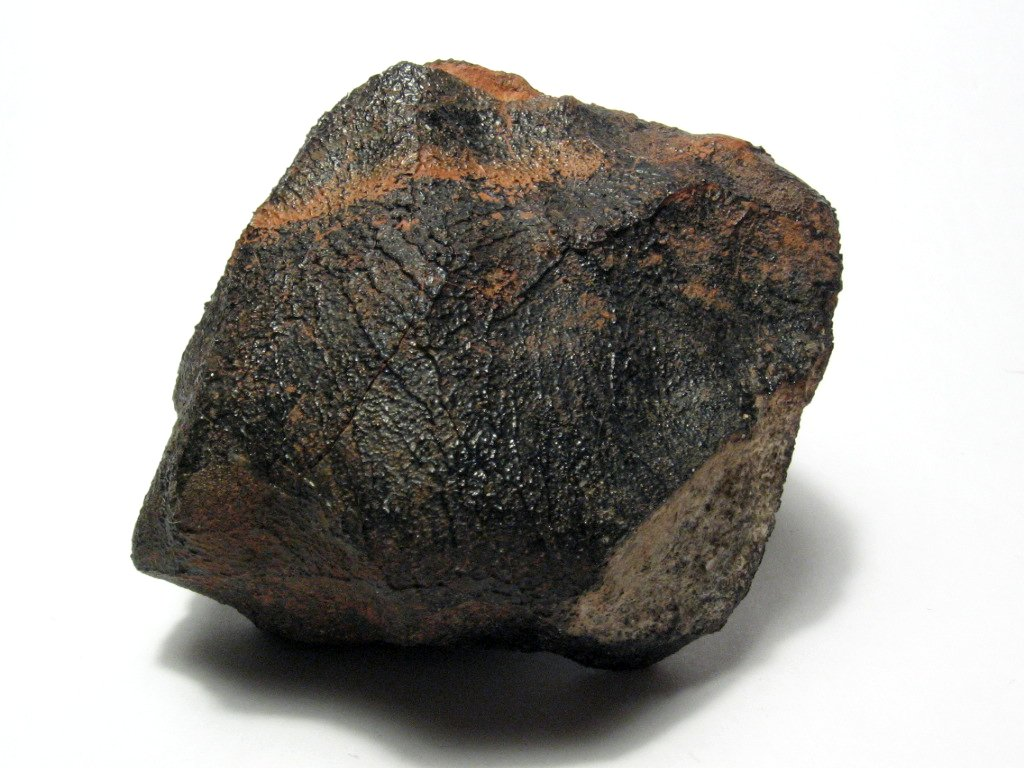
- A eucrite achondrite from the Millbillillie meteorite shower.

An achondrite is a stony meteorite that does not contain chondrules. It consists of material similar to terrestrial basalts or plutonic rocks and has been differentiated and reprocessed to a lesser or greater degree due to melting and recrystallization on or within meteorite parent bodies. As a result, achondrites have distinct textures and mineralogies indicative of igneous processes.

Achondrites account for about 8% of meteorites overall, and the majority (about $2/3$) of them belong to the HED clan, possibly originating from the crust of asteroid Vesta. Other types include Martian, Lunar, and several types thought to originate from as-yet unidentified asteroids. These groups have been determined on the basis of e.g. the Fe/Mn chemical ratio and the ^{17}O/^{18}O oxygen isotope ratios, thought to be characteristic "fingerprints" for each parent body.

== Classification ==
Achondrites are classified into the following groups:

- Primitive achondrites
- Asteroidal achondrites
- Lunar meteorites
- Martian meteorites

=== Primitive achondrites ===
Primitive achondrites, also called PAC group, are so-called because their chemical composition is primitive in the sense that it is similar to the composition of chondrites, but their texture is igneous, indicative of melting processes. To this group belong:

- Acapulcoites (after the meteorite Acapulco, Mexico)
- Lodranites (after the meteorite Lodran)
- Winonaites (after the meteorite Winona)
- Ureilites (after the meteorite Novy Ureii, Russia)
- Brachinites (after the meteorite Brachina)

=== Asteroidal achondrites ===
Asteroidal achondrites, also called evolved achondrites, are so-called because they have been differentiated on a parent body. This means that their mineralogical and chemical composition was changed by melting and crystallization processes. They are divided into several groups:

- HED meteorites (Vesta). They may have originated on the asteroid 4 Vesta, because their reflection spectra are very similar. They are named after the initial letters of the three subgroups:
  - Howardites
  - Eucrites
  - Diogenites
- Angrites
- Aubrites

=== Lunar meteorites ===
Lunar meteorites are meteorites that originated from the Moon.

=== Martian meteorite ===
Martian meteorites are meteorites that originated from Mars. They are divided into three main groups, with two exceptions (see last two entries):

- Shergottites
- Nakhlites
- Chassignites
- OPX martian meteorites (ALH 84001)
- Regolith/Soil samples (NWA 7034 and pairings)

== See also ==
- Glossary of meteoritics
