= IAB meteorite =

Group of iron meteorites

IAB meteorites
- — Group —
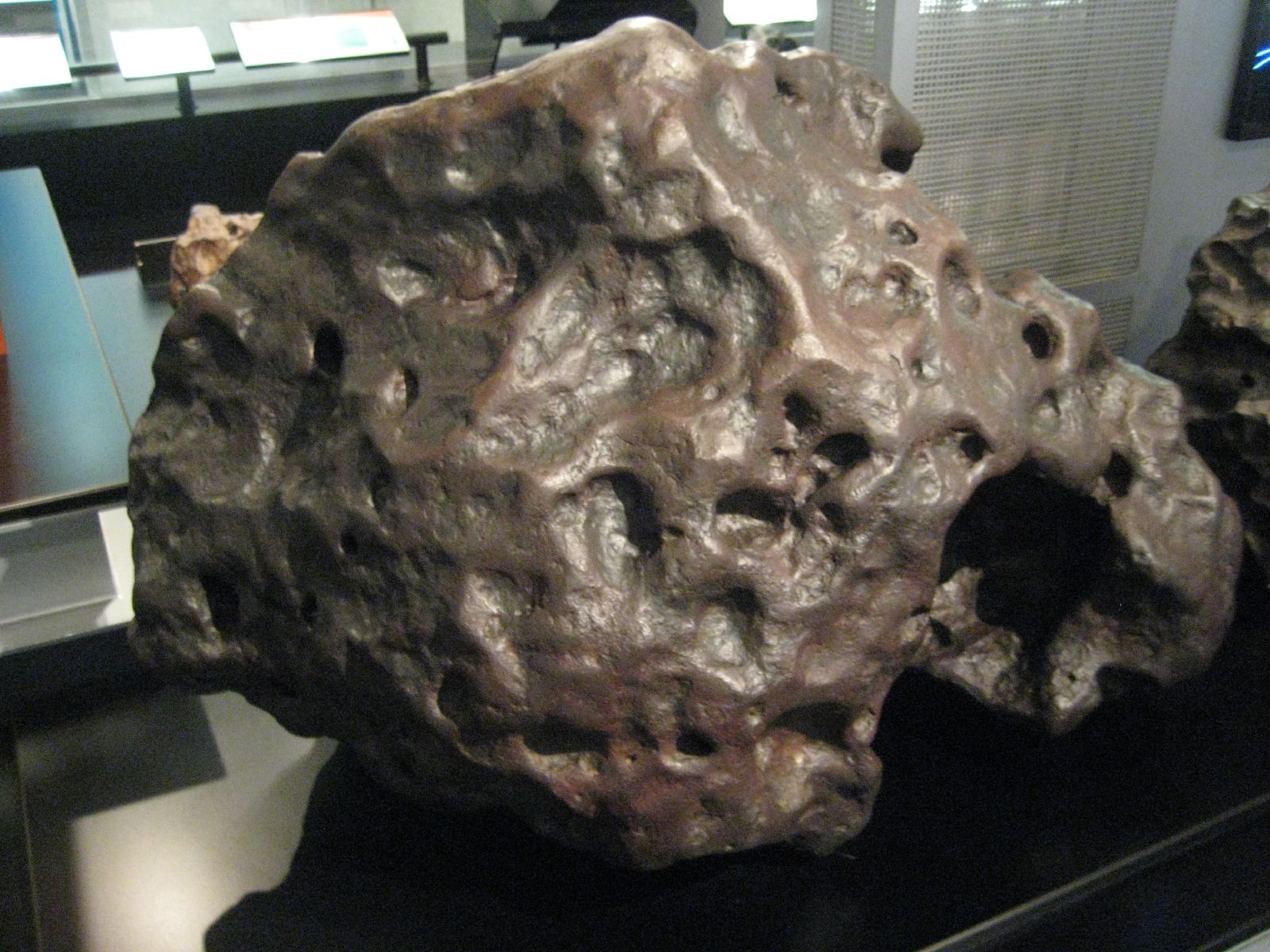
- Goose Lake Meteorite is a IAB meteorite in the sLL subgroup (low-Au, low-Ni)
- Type: Iron
- Structural classification: Hexahedrites, fine to coarse octahedrites, sometimes ataxites
- Class: Primitive achondrite
- Subgroups: sLL; sLM (was IIIC); sLH (was IIID); sHL; sHH (includes Gay Gulch trio); Udei Station grouplet; Pitts grouplet; Algarrabo duo; Mundrabilla duo; Britstown duo; NWA 468 duo; Twin City duo; Solo irons related to IAB
- Parent body: IAB
- Composition: Meteoric iron (kamacite & taenite) & silicate inclusions

IAB meteorites are a group of iron meteorites according to their overall composition and a group of primitive achondrites because of silicate inclusions that show a strong affinity to winonaites and chondrites.

== Description ==
The IAB meteorites are composed of meteoric iron (kamacite and taenite) and silicate inclusions. Structurally they can be hexahedrites, fine to coarse octahedrites, or even ataxites. Most of them are octahedrite with medium to coarse taenite-lamella and distinct Widmanstätten patterning.

The silicate inclusions are composed of low-Ca pyroxene, high-Ca pyroxene, olivine, plagioclase, troilite, graphite, different phosphates, meteoric iron and traces of daubréelite and chromite. This composition is very similar to the composition of winonaites, and it is therefore argued that the two groups share the same parent body. There are also similarities with the IIICD meteorites, but it is not yet clear whether they are also part of that parent body.

== Classification ==
The IAB group was created from the older IA and IB groups. Some authors also prefer to call it IAB complex.

There are numerous subdivisions of the IAB group:

- IAB main group
- sLL subgroup
- sLM subgroup (originally IIIC)
- sLH subgroup (originally IIID)
- sHL subgroup
- sHH subgroup (includes Gay Gulch trio)
- Udei Station grouplet
- Pitts grouplet
- Algarrabo duo
- Mundrabilla duo
- Britstown duo
- NWA 468 duo
- Twin City duo
- solo irons related to IAB
- IAB related?

== Parent body ==
Most scientists believe that the winonaites and the IAB meteorites share the same parent body. It is not yet fully understood whether the IIICD meteorites also belong to that body.

== Notable specimen ==
- Canyon Diablo
- Pitts meteorite (part of Pitts grouplet)
- Udei station meteorite (part of Udei station grouplet)
- Goose Lake Meteorite
- Monturaqui
- Nantan meteorite
- Mörigen Arrowhead

== See also ==
- Glossary of meteoritics
