= Glossary of meteoritics =

This is a glossary of terms used in meteoritics, the science of meteorites.

== # ==
- 2 Pallas – an asteroid from the asteroid belt and one of the likely parent bodies of the CR meteorites.
- 4 Vesta – second-largest asteroid in the asteroid belt and likely source of the HED meteorites and mesosiderites.
- 20 Massalia – likely source of the L type ordinary chondrites.
- 221 Eos – an asteroid from the asteroid belt and one of the likely parent bodies of the CO meteorites.
- 289 Nenetta – an asteroid from the asteroid belt and one of the likely parent bodies of the angrites.
- 3103 Eger – an asteroid from the asteroid belt and one of the likely parent bodies of the aubrites.
- 3819 Robinson – an asteroid from the asteroid belt and one of the likely parent bodies of the angrites.
- IA meteorite – an iron meteorite group now part of the IAB group/complex.
- IAB meteorite – an iron meteorite and primitive achondrite of the IAB group/complex.
- IB meteorite – an iron meteorite group now part of the IAB group/complex.
- IC meteorite – an iron meteorite that is part of the IC group.

== A ==
- Ablation – the process of a meteorite losing mass during the passage through the atmosphere.
- Acapulcoite – a group of primitive achondrites.
- Accretion – the process in which matter of the protoplanetary disk coalesces to form planetesimals.
- Achondrite – a differentiated meteorite (meaning without chondrules).
- Aerolite – an old term for stony meteorites.
- ALH – an abbreviation used for meteorites from Allan Hills.
- Allan Hills 84001 – is an exotic meteorite from Mars that does not fit into any of the SNC groups and was thought to contain evidence for life on Mars.
- Allende meteorite – is the largest carbonaceous chondrite ever found on Earth.
- Amphoterite – an obsolete classification of chondritic meteorites that are now classified as LL.
- Angrite – a basaltic meteorite.
- ANSMET – the Antarctic Search for Meteorites is a scientific program that looks for meteorites in the Transantarctic Mountains.
- Asteroidal achondrite – an achondrite that differentiated on an asteroid or planetesimal (see planetary achondrite)
- Asteroid spectral types – classification of asteroids according to their spectra.
- Ataxite – an iron meteorite that has no visible structures when etched.
- Aubrite – a class of achondrite meteorites composed primarily of the orthopyroxene enstatite

== B ==
- Basalt – mafic igneous rock found on the terrestrial planets and differentiated asteroids, found in meteorites such as shergottites (Mars) and eucrites (Vesta).
- Basaltic achondrite – a grouping of basalt meteorites (HED meteorites + Angrite)
- Brachinite – either a primitive achondrite or an asteroidal achondrite
- Bolide – is an extremely bright meteor, especially one that explodes in the atmosphere

== C ==
- C – can refer to carbonaceous chondrite or to an iron meteorite designation (Roman numeral and letter).
- Carbonaceous chondrite
- CAI – an abbreviation of calcium–aluminium-rich inclusion
- Calcium–aluminium-rich inclusion
- Chassignite
- Chondrite – stony meteorites unmodified by melting or differentiation of the parent body
- Chondrule – millimetre-scale round grains found in chondrites
- Clan – meteorites that are not similar enough to form a group, but are also not too different from each other to be put in separate classes.
- Class – two or more groups that have a similar chemistry and oxygen isotope ratios.
- Compositional type – a classification based on overall composition, for example stony, iron, stony-iron (as introduced by Maskelyne). Can also refer to the composition deduced from spectroscopy of asteroids.
- Condensation – the process of chemicals changing from the gaseous to the solid phase during the cooling of the protoplanetary disk.
- Condensation sequence – the sequence of minerals that changes from the gaseous to the solid state while the protoplanetary disk cools.
- Cosmic dust – small interplanetary and interstellar particles that are similar to meteorites (See Micrometeorite).
- Cosmochemistry – the study of the chemical composition of the universe and its constituents, and the processes that produced those compositions.

== D ==
- Dar al Gani – a meteorite field in the Libyan Sahara.
- Desert glass – natural glass found in deserts formed from the silica in sand as a result of lightning strikes or meteor impacts.
- Differentiated – a meteorite that has undergone igneous differentiation. (See: achondrite)
- Differentiation – usually the process of a planetesimal forming an iron core and silicate mantle.
- Duo – a grouping of two meteorites that share similar characteristics (see Grouplet).

== E ==
- E – can refer to enstatite chondrite or to an iron meteorite designation (Roman numeral and letter).
- Eagle Station grouplet – a set of pallasite meteorite specimen that do not fit into any of the defined pallasite groups.
- Electrophonic bolide – a meteoroid which produces a measurable discharge of electromagnetic energy (EMP) during its passage through the atmosphere.
- Enstatite achondrite – a meteorite that is mostly composed of enstatite. Usually part of the aubrite group.
- Enstatite chondrite – a rare form of meteorite thought to comprise only 2% of chondrites.

== F ==
- Fall – a meteorite that was seen while it fell to Earth and found.
- Find – a meteorite that was found without seeing it fall.
- Fossil meteorite – a meteorite that was buried under layers of sediment before the start of the Quaternary period. Some or all of the original cosmic material has been replaced by diagenetic minerals. (It is, however, not a fossil).
- Fusion crust – a coating on meteorites that forms during their passage through the atmosphere.

== G ==
- Group – a collection of five or more meteorites sharing similar characteristics.
- Grouplet – a collection of fewer than five meteorites sharing similar characteristics.

== H ==
- Hammer Stone – a specific individual meteorite that has hit either a human, man-made object, and/or an animal.
- HED – abbreviation for three basaltic achondrite groups howardite, eucrite and diogenite.
- HED meteorite – a clan of basaltic achondrites.
- Hexahedrite – a structural class of iron meteorites having a relatively low nickel content
- Hunter – a person who searches for meteorites.

== I ==
- Impact breccia – rock composed of fragments of terrestrial, extraterrestrial or mixed origin fused by the energy of impact
- Impactite – informal term for a terrestrial rock resulting from the shocking impact of a meteor.
- Insoluble organic matter – Kerogen-like macromolecule residue from carbonaceous chondrite meteorites after soluble organic matter has been removed.
- Iron–nickel alloy – an alternative expression for meteoric iron.
- Iron meteorite – a meteorite that is mainly composed of meteoric iron.

== K ==
- Kakangari chondrite – a group of chondrite meteorites.
- Kamacite – a native metal (mineral) found in meteorites.

== L ==
- Lherzolite – a variety of olivine rich ultramafic plutonic rock that contains both clino- and ortho- pyroxene. They are usually shergottites and also occur in Earth’s upper mantle.
- Lherzolitic shergottite – an olivine rich, plutonic shergottite that formed as a cumulate rock on Martian magma chambers.
- Lodranite – member of a small group of primitive achondrites thought to derive from deeper within the same parent body as acapulcoites
- Lunaite – a meteorite that originated from the Moon (synonym of Lunar meteorite). Compare Category:Meteorites found on bodies other than Earth.
- Lunar meteorite – a meteorite that originated from the Moon (synonym of Lunaite). Compare Category:Meteorites found on bodies other than Earth.

== M ==
- Main group pallasite – a pallasite belonging to the main group.
- Main mass – the largest/heaviest piece of a fragmented meteorite, typically found in a strewn field.
- Magmatic meteorite - achondrites of magmatic origin and iron meteorites (includes pallasites).
- Martian meteorite – a meteorite that originated from Mars. Compare Category:Meteorites found on bodies other than Earth.
- Maskelynite – a natural glass found in meteorites.
- Matrix – the mineral assemblage surrounding chondrules.
- Mesosiderite – a grouping of stony-iron meteorite that are breccias.
- Meteoric iron – a native metal found in meteorites and a mixture of different mineral phases. Compare telluric iron.
- Meteorite Observation and Recovery Program – a scientific program that was centered in Canada.
- Meteoriticist – a scientist working on meteorites, meteors, and meteoroids.
- Meteoritics – the science of meteorites, meteors, and meteoroids.
- MORP – abbreviation for Meteorite Observation and Recovery Program.
- Micrometeorite – microscopic meteorites derived from Cosmic dust.
- Missing mantle problem – planetary paradox where expected olivine rich silicate mantle debris from early differentiation and impacts is missing from the asteroid belt and meteorite record .

== N ==
- Nakhlite – a group of Martian meteorites
- Neumann lines (or Neumann bands) – a pattern of fine parallel lines seen in some iron meteorites, thought to be due to impact events on the parent body
- Nonmagmatic meteorite – (deprecated) iron meteorites that were thought to have not formed by igneous processes.
- NWA – Northwest Africa, meteorite recovered somewhere in the Sahara or Sahel regions including Morocco, Algeria, Mali, Mauritania, Niger, or Libya without a precise, documented find site or GPS coordinates.

== O ==
- O – usually refers to ordinary chondrite
- Observed fall – a meteorite that was seen when it fell to Earth.
- Octahedrite – the most common structural class of iron meteorites.
- Ordinary chondrite – a chondrite meteorite, where 'ordinary' means that it is the most common found

== P ==
- PAC – abbreviation for primitive achondrite.
- Pallasite – a class of stony–iron meteorite.
- Panspermia – the hypothesis that life could reach other planets by the means of meteorites and/or comets.
- Parent body – the celestial body from which originates a meteorite or a class of meteorites.
- Peridotite – olivine rich plutonic igneous rocks native to mantles, found in certain Martian achondrites (chassignites and lherzolitic shergottites) and as ureilites and brachinites
- Petrologic type – a classification scheme that expresses the degree to which a meteorite has been affected by the secondary processes of thermal metamorphism and aqueous alteration on the parent asteroid.
- Pitts grouplet – a grouplet of meteorites that is part of the IAB meteorites.
- Planetary achondrite – an achondrite that was differentiated on a planet and not a planetesimal or asteroid (See asteroidal achondrite).
- Plessite – a fine grained intergrowth found in meteoric iron consisting of kamacite, taenite and tetrataenite lamella.
- Presolar grains – interstellar solid matter in the form of tiny solid grains from a time before the Sun was formed.
- Primitive meteorite - chondrites and primitive achondrties such as winonaites, lodranites, and acapulcoites.
- Primitive achondrite – a meteorite that has similarities to achondrites and chondrites.
- Protoplanetary disk – a circumstellar disk from which all solids in the Solar System formed.
- Pyroxene pallasite grouplet
- Pyroxenite – pyroxene rich plutonic igneous rocks, found in certain Martian achondrites (nakhlites) and as diogenites

== R ==
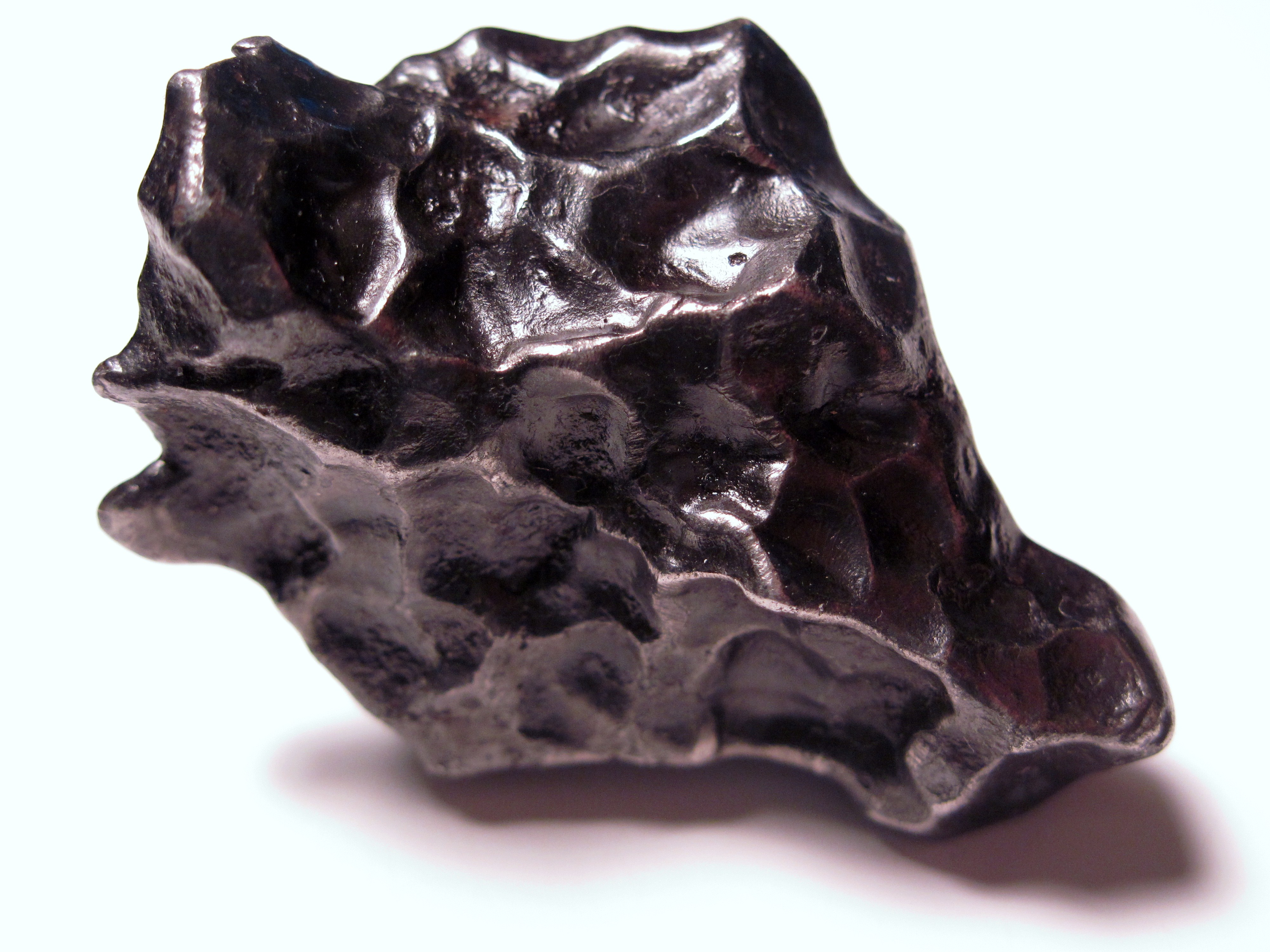
Regmaglypts on Sikhote Alin

- Regmaglypts – thumbprint-sized indentations in the surface of larger meteorites formed by ablation as the meteorite passes through a planet's atmosphere, probably caused by vortices of hot gas.
- Rose-Tschermak-Brezina classification – a classification developed by Gustav Rose, Gustav Tschermak and Aristides Brezina.
- Rumuruti chondrite – a group of chondrites.

== S ==
- Shergottite – igneous rocks of mafic to ultramafic lithology, named after a meteorite that fell at Sherghati, India in 1865.
- Shock stage – a measure of the degree of fracturing of the matrix of a common chondrite meteorite.
- Shock metamorphism – the effects of shock-wave related deformation and heating during impact events.
- Siderite – the old term for iron meteorite.
- Siderolite – the old term for stony-iron meteorites.
- SNC – abbreviation for shergottite, nakhlite and chassignite, the three main types of Martian meteorite.
- Solar nebula – a synonym of the protoplanetary disk.
- Soluble organic matter – compounds that can be extracted from carbonaceous chondrites using water or other solvents. These compounds include amino acids, carboxylic acids, and nucleotide bases.
- Spectral class –
- Stony meteorite – a meteorite composed mostly of silicates.
- Stony-iron meteorite – a meteorite that is a mixture of meteoric iron and silicates.
- Strewn field – a field of fragments from one meteorite fall.
- Structural class – a subdivision of iron meteorites in ataxites, hexahedrites and octahedrites.
- Superbolide – is a bolide that reaches an apparent magnitude of −17 or brighter, which is roughly 100 times brighter than the full moon. Recent examples of superbolides include the Sutter's Mill meteorite and the Chelyabinsk meteor.

== T ==
- Taenite – a native metal (mineral) found in meteorites.
- Tamdakht – a meteorite that fell near Ouarzazate, Morocco on 2008-12-20 producing a strewn field of approximately 25 km (16 mi) by 2 km (1.2 mi) and two small impact craters.
- Tektite – glassy terrestrial debris created by meteorite impacts.
- Thumbprinting – see regmaglypts
- Total known weight (TKW) – total known mass of a meteorite.
- Trio – a grouping of three meteorites that share similar characteristics (see Grouplet).
- Type – subdivision of meteorites. Loosely defined. Usually refers to chondrite, achondrite and sometimes primitive achondrite.

== U ==
- Udei Station grouplet – a grouplet of meteorites that is part of the IAB meteorites.
- Ungrouped – a meteorite that has not been assigned to a group or grouplet.
- Undifferentiated
- Ureilite

== V ==
- Vesta – second largest asteroid in the asteroid belt and likely source of the HED meteorites.
- Volatile elements – are chemical elements that have low boiling and condensation temperatures.

== W ==
- Widmanstätten pattern – a fine interleaving of kamacite and taenite bands/ribbons found in octahedrite irons and some pallasites.
- Willamette meteorite – the largest meteorite discovered in North America, found in the Willamette Valley of Oregon.
- Winonaite – a type of primitive achondrite meteorite.
- Weston meteorite – a meteorite which fell to earth above the town of Weston, Connecticut on December 14, 1807.
