= Meteorite classification =

Systems of grouping meteorites based on shared characteristics

In meteoritics, a meteorite classification system attempts to group similar meteorites and allows scientists to communicate with a standardized terminology when discussing them. Meteorites are classified according to a variety of characteristics, especially mineralogical, petrological, chemical, and isotopic properties.

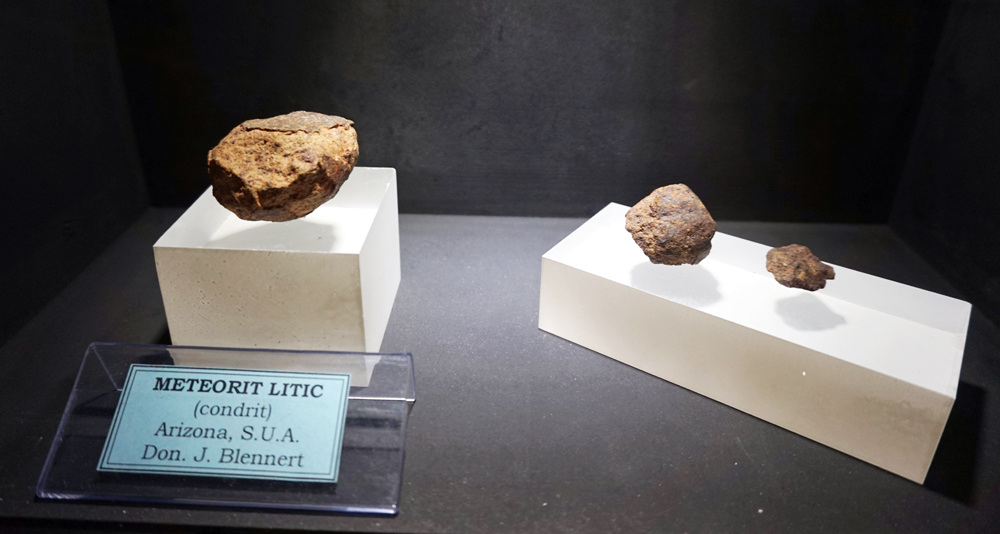
Meteorites

== Terminology ==
There is no single, standardized terminology used in meteorite classification; however, commonly used terms for categories include types, classes, clans, groups, and subgroups. Some researchers hierarchize these terms, but there is no consensus as to which hierarchy is most appropriate. Meteorites that do not fit any known group (though they may fit somewhere within a higher level of classification) are ungrouped.

== Genetic relationships ==
Meteorite classification may indicate that a "genetic" relationship exists between similar meteorite specimens. Similarly classified meteorites may share a common origin, and therefore may come from the same astronomical object (such as a planet, asteroid, or moon) known as a parent body. However, with current scientific knowledge, these types of relationships between meteorites are difficult to prove.

== Traditional classification scheme ==
Meteorites are often divided into three overall categories based on whether they are dominantly composed of rocky material (stony meteorites), metallic material (iron meteorites), or mixtures (stony–iron meteorites). These categories have been in use since at least the early 19th century but do not have much genetic significance; they are simply a traditional and convenient way of grouping specimens. In fact, the term "stony iron" is a misnomer as currently used. One group of chondrites (CB) has over 50% metal by volume and contains meteorites that were called stony irons until their affinities with chondrites were recognized. Some iron meteorites also contain many silicate inclusions but are rarely described as stony irons.

Nevertheless, these three categories sit at the top of the most widely used meteorite classification system. Stony meteorites are then traditionally divided into two other categories: chondrites (groups of meteorites that have undergone little change since their parent bodies originally formed and are characterized by the presence of chondrules), and achondrites (groups of meteorites that have a complex origin involving asteroidal or planetary differentiation). The iron meteorites were traditionally divided into objects with similar internal structures (octahedrites, hexahedrites, and ataxites), but these terms are now used for purely descriptive purposes and have given way to modern chemical groups. Stony–iron meteorites have always been divided into pallasites (which are now known to comprise several distinct groups) and mesosiderites (a textural term that is also synonymous with the name of a modern group).

Below is a representation of how the meteorite groups fit into the more traditional classification hierarchy:

Stony meteorites
- Chondrites
  - Carbonaceous chondrite class
    - CI chondrites (Ivuna-like) group
    - CM-CO chondrite (mini-chondrule) clan
      - CM chondrite (Mighei-like) group
      - CO chondrite (Ornans-like) group
    - CV-CK chondrite clan
      - CV chondrite (Vigarano-like) group
        - CV-oxA chondrite (oxidized, Allende-like) subgroup
        - CV-oxB chondrite (oxidized, Bali-like) subgroup
        - CV-red chondrite (reduced) subgroup
      - CK chondrite (Karoonda-like) group
    - CR chondrite clan
      - CR chondrite (Renazzo-like) group
      - CH chondrite (Allan Hills 85085-like) group
      - CB chondrite (Bencubbin-like) group
        - CBa chondrite subgroup
        - CBb chondrite subgroup
  - Ordinary chondrite class
    - H chondrite group
    - L chondrite group
    - LL chondrite group
  - Enstatite chondrite class
    - EH chondrite group
    - EL chondrite group
  - Other chondrite groups, not in one of the major classes
    - R chondrite (Rumuruti-like) group
    - K chondrite (Kakangari-like) grouplet (a grouplet is a provisional group with <5 members)
- Achondrites
  - Primitive achondrites
    - Acapulcoite group
    - Lodranite group
    - Winonaite group
  - Asteroidal achondrites
    - HED meteorite clan (possibly from asteroid 4 Vesta, also called basaltic achondrites)
      - Howardite group
      - Eucrite group
      - Diogenite group
    - Angrite group
    - Aubrite group (enstatite achondrites)
    - Ureilite group
    - Brachinite group
  - Lunar meteorite group
  - Martian meteorite group (sometimes called "SNC meteorites")
    - Shergottites
    - Nakhlites
    - Chassignites
    - Other Martian meteorites, e.g., ALH84001
Stony-iron meteorites
- Pallasites
  - Main group pallasites
  - Eagle station pallasite grouplet
  - Pyroxene pallasite grouplet
- Mesosiderite group
Iron meteorites
- Magmatic iron meteorite groups
  - IC iron meteorite group
  - IIAB iron meteorite group
  - IIC iron meteorite group
  - IID iron meteorite group
  - IIF iron meteorite group
  - IIG iron meteorite group
  - IIIAB iron meteorite group
  - IIIE iron meteorite group
  - IIIF iron meteorite group
  - IVA iron meteorite group
  - IVB iron meteorite group
- "Non-magmatic" or primitive iron meteorite groups
  - IAB iron meteorite "complex" or clan (formerly groups IAB and IIICD)
    - IAB main group
    - Udei Station grouplet
    - Pitts grouplet
    - sLL (low Au, Low Ni) subgroup
    - sLM (low Au, Medium Ni) subgroup
    - sLH (low Au, high Ni) subgroup
    - sHL (high Au, Low Ni) subgroup
    - sHH (high Au, high Ni) subgroup
  - IIE iron meteorite group

=== Rubin classification ===
A. E. Rubin (2000) classification scheme:

=== Alternative schemes ===
Meteorite classification after Weisberg, McCoy and Krot 2006.

Two alternative general classification schemes were recently published, illustrating the lack of consensus on how to classify meteorites beyond the level of groups. In the Krot et al. scheme (2003) the following hierarchy is used:

- Chondrites
- Nonchondrites
  - Primitive
  - Differentiated
    - Achondrites
    - Stony irons
    - Irons

In the Weisberg et al. (2006) scheme meteorites groups are arranged as follows:

- Chondrites
- Primitive achondrites
- Achondrites

where irons and stony–irons are considered to be achondrites or primitive achondrites, depending on the group.

== History ==
Modern meteorite classification was worked out in the 1860s, based on Gustav Rose's and Nevil Story Maskelyne's classifications. Gustav Rose worked on the meteorite collection of the Museum für Naturkunde, Berlin and Maskelyne on the collection of the British Museum, London. Rose was the first to make different categories for meteorites with chondrules (chondrites) and without (nonchondrites). Story-Maskelyne differentiated between siderites, siderolites and aerolites (now called iron meteorites, stony-iron meteorites and stony meteorite, respectively).

In 1872 Gustav Tschermak published his first meteorite classification based on Gustav Rose's catalog from 1864:

In 1883 Tschermak modified Rose's classification again.

Further modifications were made by Aristides Brezina.

The first chemical classification was published by Oliver C. Farrington, 1907.

George Thurland Prior further improved the classification based on mineralogical and chemical data, introducing the terms mesosiderite, lodranite and enstatite chondrite. In 1923 he published a catalogue of the meteorites in the Natural History Museum (London). He describes his classification as based on Gustav Tschermak and Aristides Brezina with modifications by himself. His main subdivisions were:

1. Meteoric Irons or Siderites
2. Meteoric Stony-irons or Siderolites
3. Meteoric Stones or Aerolites.

He subdivides the "Meteoric Stones" into those that have chondrules (Chondritic Meteoric Stones or Chondrites) and those that don't (Non-chondritic Meteoric Stones or Achondrites). The iron meteorites are subdivided according to their structures as ataxites, hexahedrites and octahedrites. A complete overview of his classification is given in the box below:

Brian Harold Mason published a further revision in the 1960s.

== See also ==
- Glossary of meteoritics
- Asteroid spectral types
