= Lac Dodon =

Iron meteorite

- Type: Iron
- Structural classification: Coarse octahedrite
- Group: IAB complex
- Composition: 91% Fe, 8.64% Ni, 71 ppm Ga, 377 ppm Ge, 3.30 ppm Ir
- Country: Canada
- Region: Quebec, Canada
- Coordinates: 45°57′00″N 73°55′00″W
- Observed fall: no
- Found date: 1993
- TKW: 0.8 kilograms (1.8 lb)

Lac Dodon is an iron meteorite discovered by Roland Octerneau of Montreal on rural private property near Lac Dodon, Saint-Calixte, Quebec.

The recovered fragment measures approximately 10 centimetres (3.9 in) x 5 centimetres (2.0 in) x 6 centimetres (2.4 in). The meteorite was oxidized on its exterior and lying at the surface of the ground.

== Composition and classification ==
The meteorite is a coarse octahedrite (mean bandwidth 1.34mm) with narrow cloudy taenite bands separating the kamacite lamellae. Occasional areas of coarse to fine acicular plessite and net plessite are Neumann lines and rhabdites. Sparsely developed Brezina lamellae and fine-grained globular schreibersite are present. At one exterior surface, a heat-affected zone 0.1mm thick containing unequilibrated alpha(sub)2-kamacite is preserved. Cloudy taenite extending into this zone has developed bainitic texture. The presence of the zone suggests a relatively recent fall.

== See also ==
- Glossary of meteoritics
- Meteorite
