= Bellsbank meteorite =

Meteorite found in South Africa

Bellsbank
- Type: Iron meteorite
- Structural classification: Hexahedrite
- Group: IIG
- Parent body: IIG-IIAB
- Composition: Meteoric iron (Kamacite), Schreibersite
- Country: South Africa
- Coordinates: 28°5′S 24°5′E
- Observed fall: No
- Found date: 1955
- TKW: 38 kilograms (84 lb)

The Bellsbank meteorite is a hexahedrite iron meteorite with abundant schreibersite. It is classified as a member of the IIG group. It was found in Bellsbank, South Africa in 1955.

== Discovery and naming ==
The meteorite was found in 1955 near Bellsbank (28°5′S 24°5′E), northwest of Kimberley (South Africa). Only one specimen with a mass of 38 kilograms (84 lb) was dug out from a field. The meteorite was first described in 1959.

== Description ==
The meteorite is hexahedrite iron meteorite. It consists of meteoric iron (exclusively kamacite) and schreibersite. The surface of the meteorite is pitted and weathered. Upon etching the meteorite shows Neumann lines. The meteoric iron has Nickel concentrations as low as 1.6%.

== Classification ==
The Bellsbank meteorite was the type specimen of the grouplet called "Bellsbank Trio". After 5 meteorites were found the grouplet was renamed IIG group.

== See also ==
- Glossary of meteoritics
