= Allabogdanite =

Phosphide mineral

General
- Category: Phosphide mineral
- Formula: (Fe,Ni)_{2}P
- IMA symbol: Abg
- Strunz classification: 1.BD.15
- Crystal system: Orthorhombic
- Crystal class: Dipyramidal (mmm); H-M symbol: (2/m 2/m 2/m)
- Space group: Pnma
- Unit cell: a = 5.748, b = 3.548 c = 6.661 [Å]; Z = 4

Identification
- Color: Light straw-yellow
- Crystal habit: Minute exolution laminae in plessite
- Tenacity: Brittle
- Mohs scale hardness: 5–6
- Luster: Metallic
- Diaphaneity: Opaque
- Specific gravity: 7.11

Allabogdanite is a very rare phosphide mineral with the chemical formula (Fe,Ni)_{2}P, found in 1994 in a meteorite. It was described for an occurrence in the Onello meteorite in the Onello River basin, Sakha Republic; Yakutia, Russia; associated with taenite, schreibersite, kamacite, graphite and awaruite. It was named for Russian geologist Alla Bogdanova.

In a June 2021 study, scientists reported the discovery of terrestrial allabogdanite in a sedimentary formation. It is located in the Negev desert of Israel, just southwest of the Dead Sea.

== See also ==
- Glossary of meteoritics
- List of minerals
- List of minerals named after people
