= Twannberg meteorite =

Iron meteorite found in Switzerland

Twannberg
- Type: Iron
- Structural classification: Hexahedrite
- Group: IIG
- Parent body: IIG-IIAB
- Composition: Meteoric iron 5.1 % Ni (Kamacite), Schreibersite
- Country: Switzerland
- Region: Canton of Bern
- Coordinates: 47°7′28″N 7°10′44″E
- Observed fall: No
- Found date: 9 May 1984
- TKW: 20.69 kilograms (45.6 lb) (6 fragments)

The Twannberg meteorite is a hexahedrite iron meteorite. It is the only meteorite of the IIG group found in Europe and the largest meteorite ever found in Switzerland.

== Discovery and naming ==
The first fragment (15.91 kilograms (35.1 lb)) was found on 9 May 1984 in a barley field near Twann, after it had been ploughed (Twannberg I). Two additional fragments were found in an unnatural setting. One fragment (II) was found in 2000 in an attic in Twann and another (III) in 2005 in the Naturhistorisches Museum Bern, in a collection received from the Museum Schwab in Biel where it had been labeled as hematite around 1930. Twannberg IV, V and VI were found in the creek Twannbach.

The meteorite is named after Twannberg (from German: Twann mountain), a mountain that lies north of Twann.

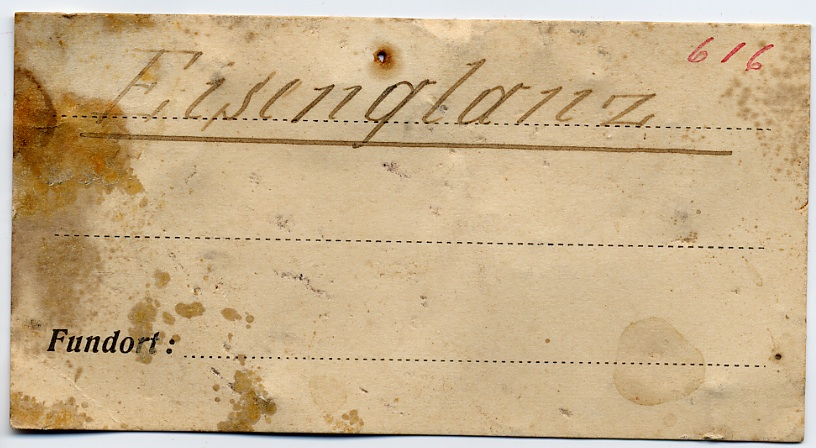
Original label of Twannberg mass III, written by Fritz Antenen (1867-1944). Eisenglanz is a German term for hematite.

The find location is a glacial till deposit. This paired with minerals found in the oxidized surface of the meteorite are an indicator that the meteorite fell on the Rhone glacier and was transported by it to Twann during the Würm ice age and then deposited there.

== Mineralogy ==
The meteorite is composed of meteoric iron and schreibersite. The meteoric iron has 5.1% Nickel, and is all in the form of kamacite. The preatmospheric mass was estimated to be at least 11,000 kilograms (24,000 lb). The surface of the meteorite is covered in an oxidation layer.

== Classification ==
The meteorite is classified as a member of group IIG.

== See also ==
- Glossary of meteoritics
