= Sikhote-Alin meteorite =

1947 meteorite impact in southeastern Russia

Sikhote-Alin
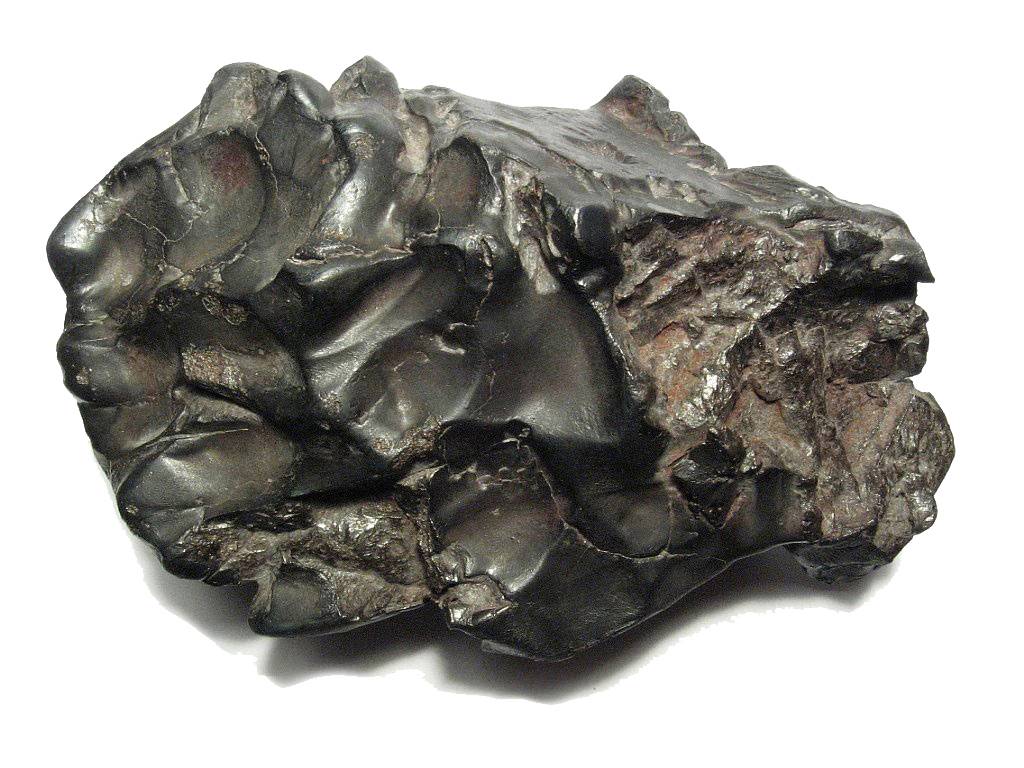
- Thumbprinted Sikhote-Alin sample
- Type: Iron
- Structural classification: Octahedrite, coarsest
- Group: IIAB
- Composition: 93% Fe, 5.9% Ni, 0.42% Co, 0.46% P, 0.28% S
- Country: Russian SFSR
- Region: Sikhote-Alin mountains, Primorsky Krai, Far Eastern Federal District
- Coordinates: 46°09′36″N 134°39′12″E
- Observed fall: Yes
- Fall date: 12 February 1947
- TKW: >23 tonnes (25 short tons)
- Strewn field: Yes
- Related media on Wikimedia Commons

The Sikhote-Alin Meteorite is an iron meteorite that fell in 1947 in the Sikhote-Alin Mountains of what was then the Russian SFSR, a part of the Soviet Union. An estimated 23 tonnes (25 short tons; 51,000 pounds) of fragments survived the fiery passage through the atmosphere and reached the surface of the Earth. Large iron meteorite falls were witnessed, and fragments of the meteorite have been recovered, but never before in recorded history has a fall of this magnitude occurred.

== Impact ==
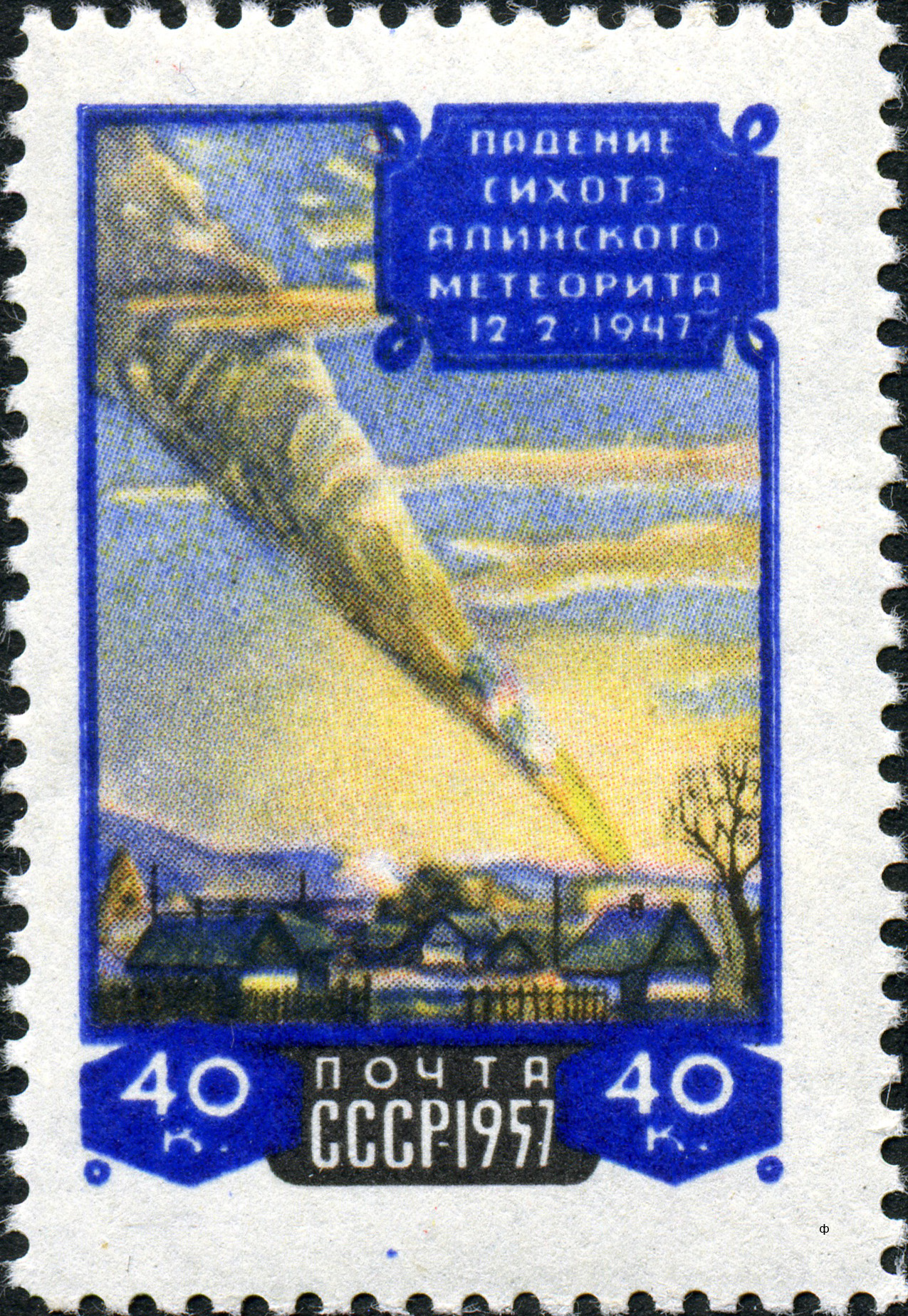
The 10th anniversary stamp. It reproduces a painting by P. J. Medvedev.

At around 10:30 on 12 February 1947, eyewitnesses in the Sikhote-Alin Mountains, Primorye, Soviet Union, observed a large bolide brighter than the sun that came out of the north and descended at an angle of about 41 degrees. The bright flash and the loud sound of the fall were observed for 300 kilometres (190 mi) around the point of impact not far from Luchegorsk and approximately 440 km (270 mi) northeast of Vladivostok. A smoke trail, estimated at 32 km (20 mi) long, remained in the sky for several hours.

As the meteor, travelling at a speed of about 14 km/s (50,400 km/h; 31,300 mph), entered the atmosphere, it began to break apart, and the fragments fell together, some burying themselves 6 metres (20 ft) deep. At an altitude of about 5.6 km (3.5 mi), the largest mass apparently broke up in an explosion called an air burst.

On 20 November 1957 the Soviet Union issued a stamp for the 10th anniversary of the Sikhote-Alin meteorite shower. It reproduced a painting by P. I. Medvedev, a Soviet artist who witnessed the fall: he was sitting in his window starting a sketch when the fireball appeared and immediately began drawing what he saw.

== Orbit ==
Because the meteor fell during the daytime, it was observed by many eyewitnesses. Evaluation of this observational data allowed V. G. Fesenkov, then chairman of the meteorite committee of the USSR Academy of Science, to estimate the meteoroid's orbit before it encountered the Earth. This orbit was ellipse-shaped, with its point of greatest distance from the sun situated within the asteroid belt, similar to many other small bodies crossing the orbit of the Earth. Such an orbit was probably created by collisions within the asteroid belt.

== Mass ==
Sikhote-Alin was a massive fall, with the pre-atmospheric mass of the meteoroid estimated at approximately 90 tonnes (99 short tons; 200,000 pounds). A more recent estimate by Tsvetkov (and others) put the mass at around 100 tonnes (110 short tons; 220,000 pounds).

Krinov estimated the post-atmospheric mass of the meteoroid to be some 23,000 kg (51,000 lb).

== Strewn field and craters ==
The strewn field for this meteorite covered an elliptical area of about 1.3 km^{2} (0.50 sq mi). Some of the fragments made impact craters, the largest of which was about 26 m (85 ft) across and 6 m (20 ft) deep. Fragments of the meteorite were also driven into the surrounding trees, embedding themselves.

== Composition and classification ==
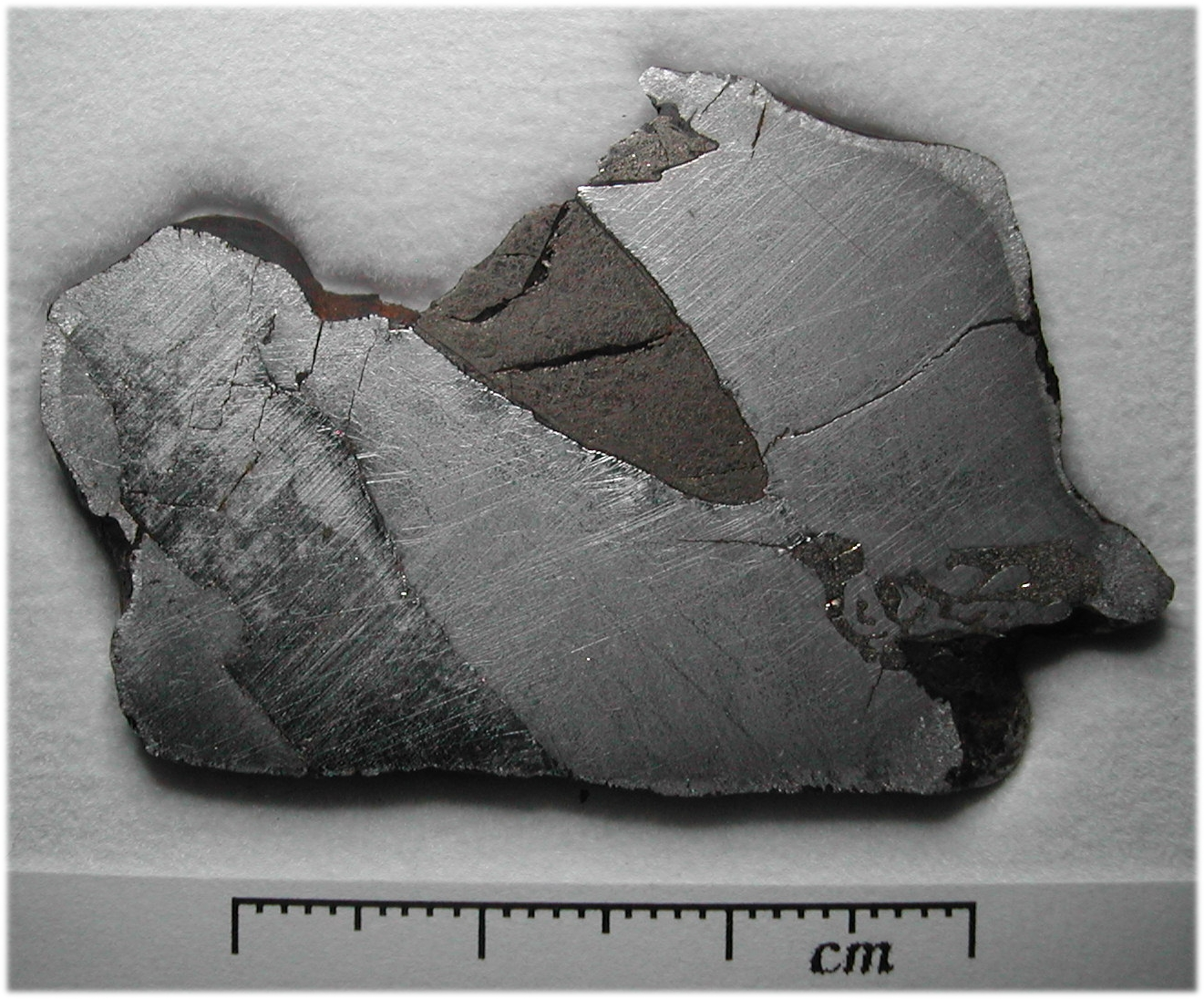
Section

The Sikhote-Alin meteorite is classified as an iron meteorite belonging to the meteorite group IIAB and with a coarse octahedrite structure. It is composed of approximately 93% iron, 5.9% nickel, 0.42% cobalt, 0.46% phosphorus and 0.28% sulfur, with trace amounts of germanium and iridium. Minerals present include taenite, plessite, troilite, chromite, kamacite and schreibersite.

== Specimens ==
Specimens of the Sikhote-Alin Meteorite are basically of two types:

1. individual, thumbprinted or regmaglypted specimens, showing fusion crust and signs of atmospheric ablation
2. shrapnel or fragmented specimens, sharp-edged pieces of torn metal showing evidence of violent fragmentation

The first type probably broke off the main object early in the descent. These pieces are characterized by regmaglypts (cavities resembling thumbprints) on the surface of each specimen. The second type are fragments which were either torn apart during the atmospheric explosions or blasted apart upon impact on the frozen ground. Most resulted from the explosion at 5.6 km (3.5 mi) altitude.

A large specimen is on display in Moscow. Many other specimens are held by Russian Academy of Science and many smaller specimens exist in the collectors' market.

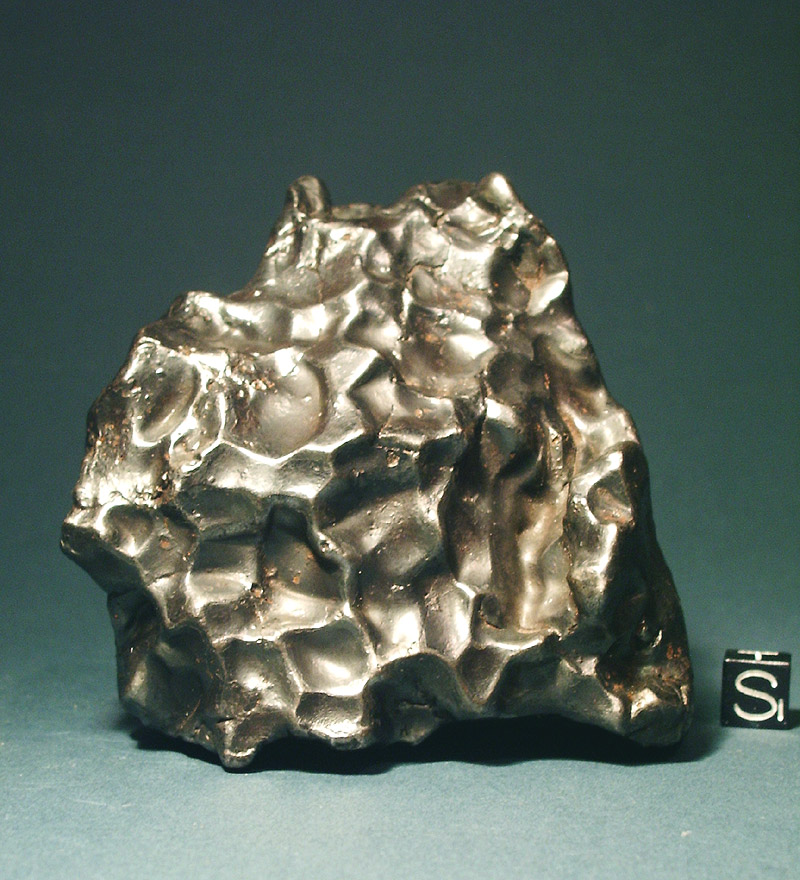
Thumbprinted individual

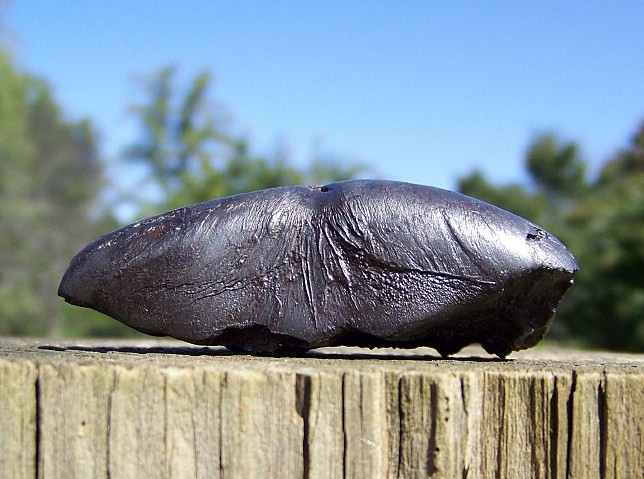
Oriented individual

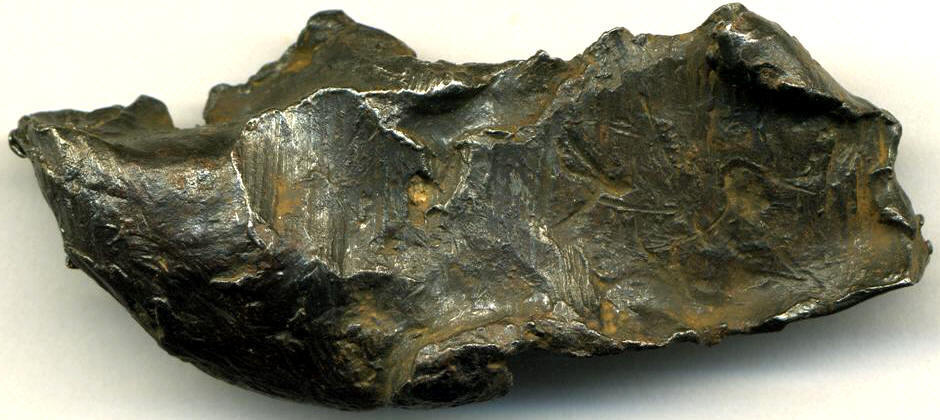
Shrapnel sample

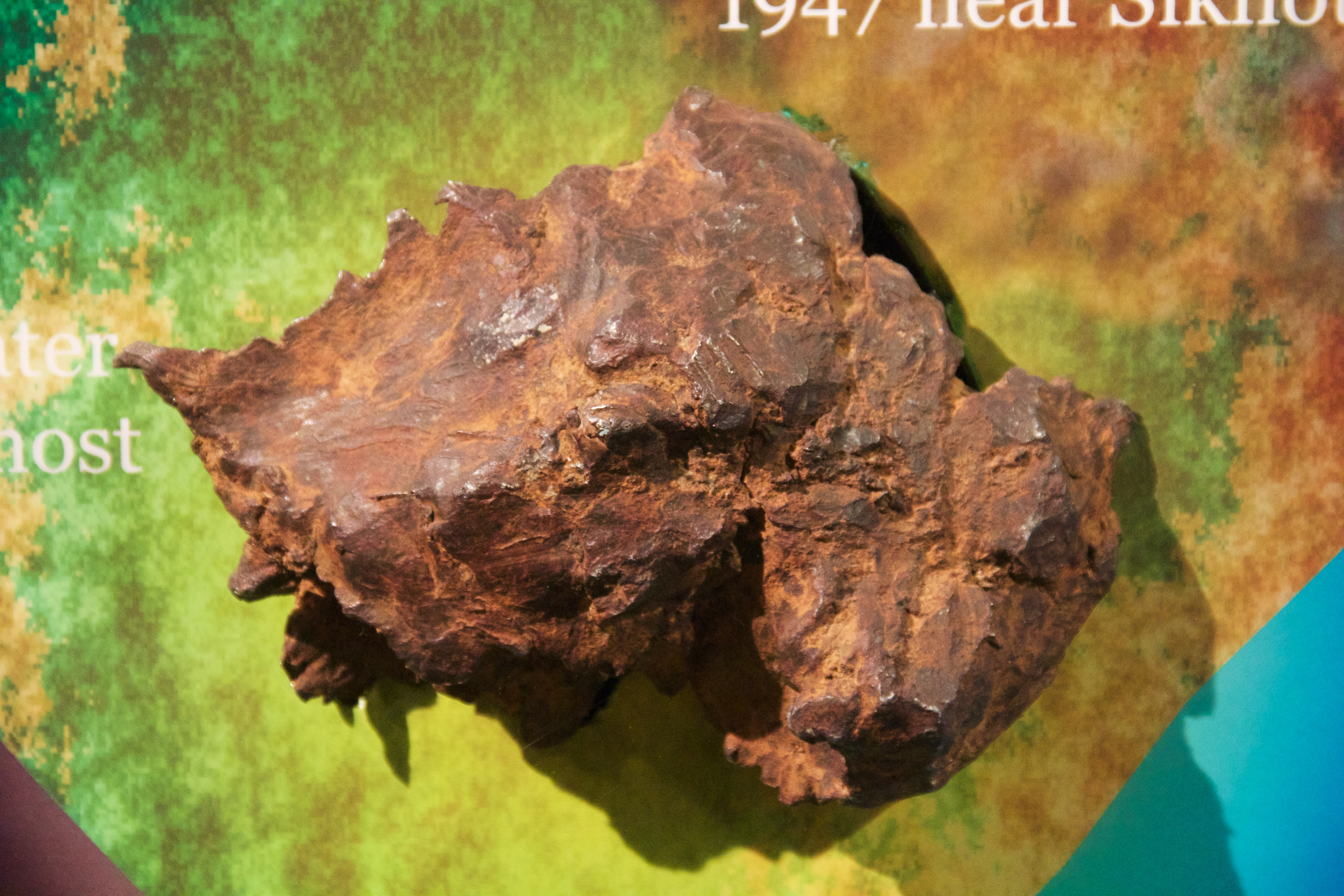
A piece on display at Meteor Crater, Arizona

== See also ==
- Glossary of meteoritics
- Meteorite
- Meteorite fall
- Chelyabinsk Meteor
- List of meteor air bursts
