= IIAB meteorites =

Type of iron meteorite

IIAB
- — Group —
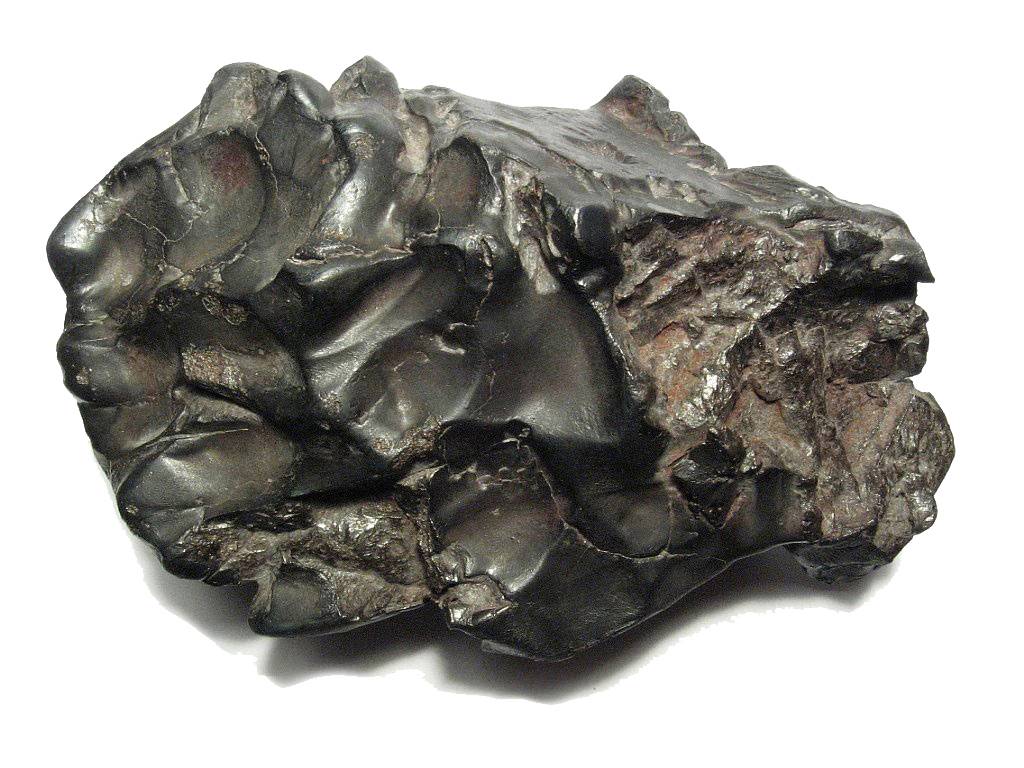
- The Sikhote-Alin is the largest IIAB meteorite.
- Compositional type: Iron
- Structural classification: Hexahedrite to Octahedrite
- Subgroups: IIA; IIB
- Parent body: IIAB-IIG
- Composition: Meteoric iron (Kamacite + Taenite)
- Total known specimens: 117 + 1 anomalous

IIAB meteorites are a group of iron meteorites. Their structural classification ranges from hexahedrites to octahedrites. IIABs have the lowest concentration of nickel of all iron meteorite groups. Most iron meteorites are derived from the metallic planetary cores of their respective parent bodies, but in the case of the IIABs the metallic magma separated to form not only this meteorite group but also the IIG group.

== Naming ==
Iron meteorite groups are designated with a Roman numeral and one or two letters. Classification is based on diagrams in which the nickel content of meteoric iron is plotted against certain trace elements (e.g. gallium, germanium and iridium). Clusters in these diagrams are assigned a row (Roman numeral) and a letter in alphabetical order. The first two clusters of the second row, IIA and IIB, were merged when additional measurements connected the two clusters into one, the IIAB group.

== Description ==
The low concentration of nickel in the IIAB group leads to most of the meteoric iron becoming kamacite.

All iron meteorites are made of a native metal called meteoric iron. The concentration of nickel has an influence on the mineralogy of the meteoric iron. During cooling, kamacite is exsolved from taenite. The lower the concentration of nickel, the more kamacite is formed. IIABs have some of the lowest nickel concentrations of all iron meteorites. They are in the range of 5.3 to 6.6%. For this reason, they mostly consist of kamacite with minor amounts of taenite. The two groups that were merged into the IIAB group had different nickel concentrations and therefore different structural classifications. The IIA group has lower nickel concentrations and forms hexahedrites; the IIB has higher nickel concentrations and forms octahedrites.

== Parent body ==
Phase diagram showing the suspected cooling path of the parent body. While cooling the parent body reached the IIAB field. It then followed the field to the eutectic point where the remaining melt cavities formed the IIG meteorites.

The IIAB meteorites formed the metallic core of their parent body before it was destroyed, and some of the fragments reached earth as iron meteorites.

The planetary core of the IIABs was rich in sulfur and phosphorus. This special chemical composition caused the magma to split into two separate liquids while cooling. The concentration of sulfur is estimated to have been about 5%. For this reason the metallic magma reached the liquidus curve (a point where solids coexist with a liquid) of the iron + liquid field. This led to the crystallization of the IIAB meteorites. The remaining liquid was trapped in cavities of the IIABs and crystallized once the temperature reached the eutectic point. At this temperature the remaining magma crystallized schreibersite and iron, thereby forming the IIG meteorites.

== Notable specimens ==
There are currently 117 meteorites classified as IIAB and 1 as IIAB-anomalous. Of these only three were observed falls.

Seven IIAB meteorites weigh more than 1000 kg. The Sikhote-Alin meteorite is the heaviest of these and was an observed fall, while the Old Woman meteorite is, at 38 × 34 × 30 inches (970 × 860 × 760 mm) and 6,070 pounds (2,750 kg) originally, the largest meteorite found in California and the second largest found in the United States.
