= Mörigen Arrowhead =

Arrowhead made from an iron meteorite

Mörigen
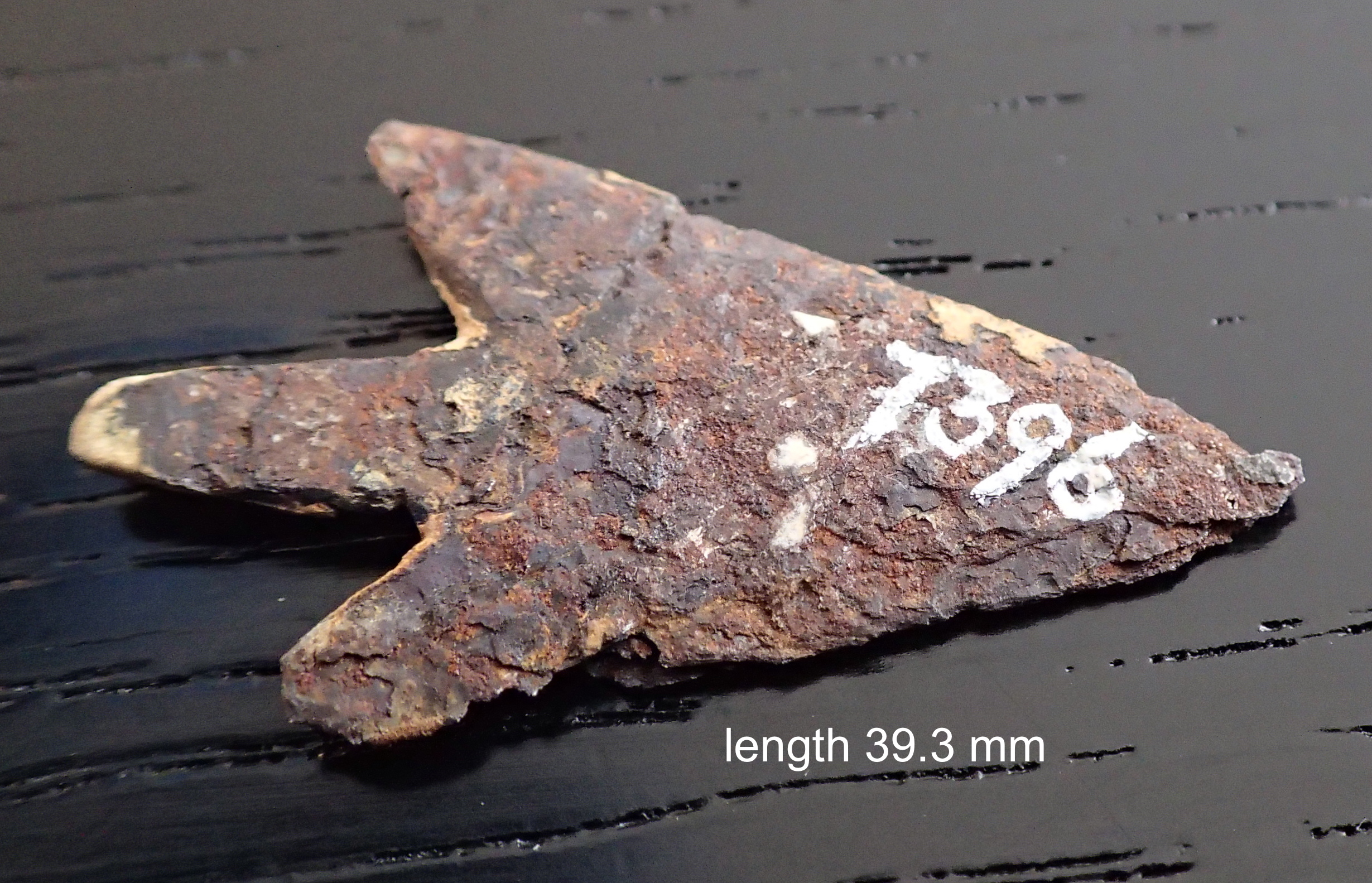
- Type: Iron meteorite
- Parent body: Kaali crater
- Country: Switzerland
- Region: Mörigen
- Observed fall: No
- Fall date: 1530–1450 BC
- Found date: circa 1873, identified 2023
- TKW: 2.9g

The Mörigen Arrowhead is a Bronze Age arrowhead made from an iron meteorite. Discovered in 1873 in Lake Biel during excavations of a settlement dating to 900–800 B.C., the arrowhead is in the collection of the Bern Historical Museum in Switzerland, where a 2023 analysis confirmed its extraterrestrial origins.

It is amongst 56 known ancient artifacts made of meteorites, of which the bulk (19 items) were found in the Tomb of Tutankhamun in Egypt.

== Description ==
The meteorite is catalogued in Bern Historical Museum under accession number A/7396, and it was likely discovered in 1873 during a series of excavations of Bronze Age settlements by Eduard Jenner and Edmund von Fellenberg.

Weighing 2.904 grams (0.1024 oz) and measuring 39.3 by 25 by 2.6 millimetres (1.55 in × 0.98 in × 0.10 in), the arrowhead was stored with other bronze arrowheads in the museum's collection. In 1987, its composition was determined to be iron, but no further analysis was conducted. In February 2021, its meteoritic origins were investigated through a survey and search of the Bern Historical Museum's collection.

== Analysis ==
Many previous archaeological analysis of past iron meteorites utilized invasive and destructive methods, so to preserve the arrowhead, a combination of X-ray fluorescence (XRF), muon-induced X-ray emission (MIXE) and scanning electron microscopy were utilized to determine the composition of the artifact.

Though it looked like a "typical arrowhead covered in rust", the composition of approximately 7.12–8.28% nickel, 0.85% cobalt, 135 ppm of gallium, and 263 ppm of germanium were determined by a combination of XRF and MIXE. The metallic composition's consistency with that of IAB meteorites, with presence of aluminum-26, confirmed its meteoric origins.

Initially, researchers hypothesized the arrowhead's origins to be the Twannberg meteorite, discovered nearby, but that was ruled out, as Twannberg has half the nickel content of the arrowhead. Sample analysis of other identified IAB meteorites determined that the Kaalijarv meteorite in Estonia is the most viable candidate for the origins of the arrowhead.

Given the lack of refined iron before the Iron Age, iron meteorites would be most viable source at the time. As such Möringen may have been the result of trade and, because of the scarcity of material, could have been forged from many fragments and utilized as a "prestige object".

As a result of this discovery, the arrowhead was exhibited by the Bern Historical Museum from February 1, 2024, to April 25, 2025.
