= São Julião de Moreira (meteorite) =

Meteorite discovered in Portugal

- Structural classification: Octahedrite
- Country: Portugal
- Region: Ponte de Lima
- Observed fall: No
- Found date: 1877
- TKW: 162 kg

São Julião de Moreira is a 162 kg meteorite found in Moreira do Lima, Ponte de Lima, Portugal.

== History ==
The meteorite was found in 1877. The fall was not observed, but was dated to 770,000 years ago. It is a single meteorite, with a mass of 162 kg, almost spherical in shape and about 35 cm in diameter, which was later divided into many pieces. It was covered with a thick layer of rust and buried in an agricultural land at Quinta das Cruzes, 1.2 meters deep, when the land was being prepared for planting vines.

== Composition and classification ==
It is a octahedrite.
