= IIAB =

IIAB may refer to:

- IIAB meteorites, a type of meteorite
- Internet-in-a-Box, an electronic device holding a low cost digital library
