= IIG (disambiguation) =

IIG may refer to:

- Independent Investigations Group, a volunteer group based at CFI Los Angeles
- IIG Capital, an American financial institution
- IIG meteorite, a group of iron meteorites
- International University in Geneva, a private business school in Geneva, Switzerland
