= IIE iron meteorite =

Type of meteorite

IIE
- — Group —
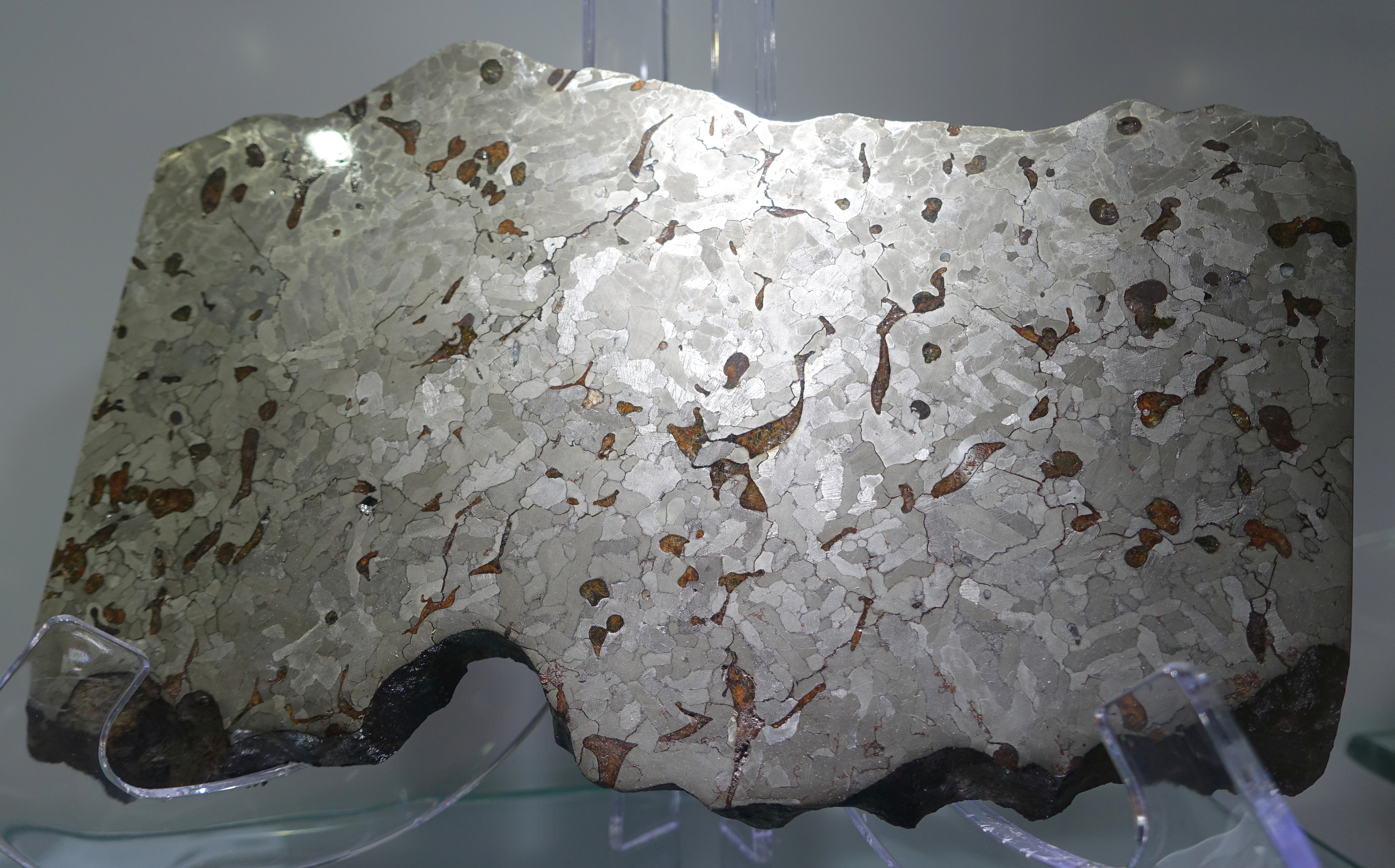
- The Weekeroo Station meteorite, an IIE iron meteorite
- Type: Iron
- Structural classification: Octahedrite
- Class: Nonmagmatic
- Parent body: Probably 6 Hebe
- Total known specimens: 21 as of 2009

The iron meteorites of the IIE chemical type are octahedrites of various coarseness, most of which contain numerous inclusions of recrystallized stony silicates.

== Composition and origin ==
They have mineral compositions and oxygen isotope ratios very similar to the H chondrites, which makes it probable that they originate from the same parent body. The best candidate for this parent body is the S-type asteroid 6 Hebe. Unlike most iron meteorites, the type IIE are thought to have been melted out of the chondritic surface of the parent asteroid by impacts during its early history.

== Rarity ==
It is a rare type with 24 known members as of 2020.

== See also ==
- Glossary of meteoritics
