= IIG meteorite =

Group of iron meteorites

IIG meteorites
- — Group —
- Type: Iron
- Structural classification: Hexahedrite
- Class: Magmatic
- Subgroups: None?
- Parent body: IIG-IIAB
- Composition: Meteoric iron (kamacite), nickel (4.1 to 4.9 %), much schreibersite (phosphorus), little sulfur
- Total known specimens: 6

IIG meteorites are a group of iron meteorites. The group currently has six members. They are hexahedrites with large amounts of schreibersite. The meteoric iron is composed of kamacite.

== Naming and history ==
Iron meteorites are designated with a Roman numeral and one or two letters. Classification is based on diagrams in which nickel content of meteoric iron is plotted against trace elements. Clusters in these diagrams are assigned a row (Roman numeral) and a letter in alphabetical order. IIG meteorites are therefore from the second row, cluster G.

The Bellsbank, La Primitiva and Tombigbee meteorites were iron meteorites that were found to have chemical and structural similarities in 1967. Further descriptions were made in 1973 and in 1974 it was proposed that the three meteorites should be grouped into the "Bellsbank Trio" grouplet. The group status, that requires five specimen was filled in 1984 by the Twannberg meteorite and in 2000 by the Guanaco meteorite.

== Description ==
IIG meteorites are hexahedrites. The meteoric iron has a low concentration of Nickel (4.1 to 4.9%) and is exclusively kamacite. IIGs contain large amounts of phosphorus in the form of schreibersite and very low concentrations of sulfur.

== Parent body ==
Phase diagram showing the suspected cooling path of the parent body. While cooling the parent body reached the IIAB field. It then followed the field to the eutectic point where the remaining melt cavities formed the IIG meteorites.

Trace elements of IIAB and IIG meteorites are offset, which was interpreted as the two groups forming on a separate planetesimal. Other explanations for the offset are melt inmiscibility. This process took place while the planetesimal was cooling off. First meteoric iron crystallized into a network of cavities and channels. Eventually crystallization cut off the channels and made cavities of trapped melt. When the remaining melt reached the eutectic point, the cavities crystallized a mixture of schreibersite and meteoric iron. The matrix of this process would form the IIAB meteorites, while the cavities would form the IIG meteorites.

== Specimen ==
The IIG group currently has 6 meteorites that are assigned to it. The Bellsbank, La Primitiva, Tombigbee, Twannberg, Guanaco and the Auburn meteorite.

== See also ==
- Glossary of meteoritics
