= Hexahedrite =

Structural class of iron meteorite

- — Structural class —
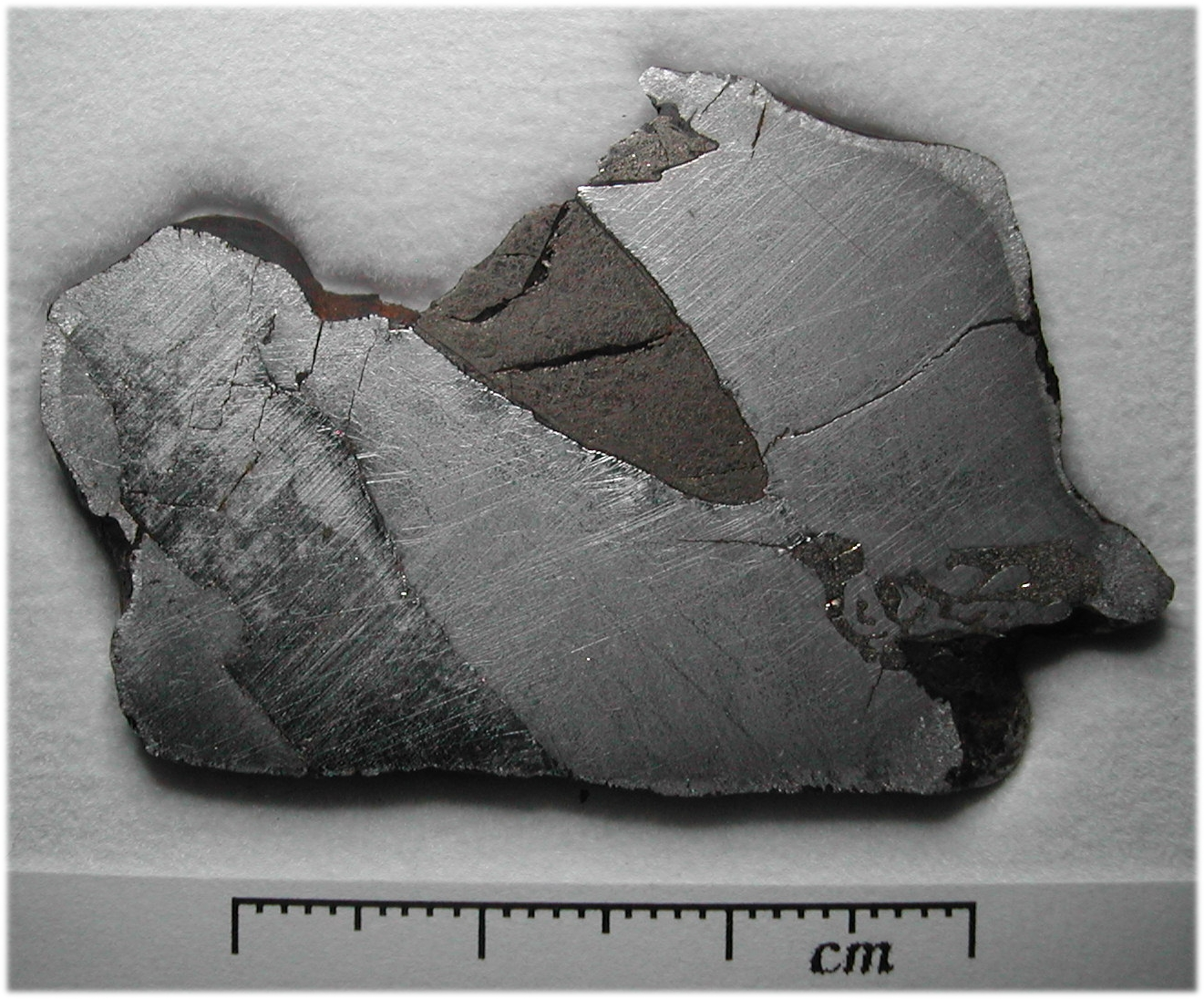
- Neumann bands in the Sikhote-Alin meteorite
- Compositional type: Iron
- Composition: Kamacite
- A phase diagram showing the link between structural and chemical classification. Hexahedrites contain mostly kamacite because their chemistry only allows kamacite as a stable phase.

Hexahedrites are a structural class of iron meteorite. They are composed almost exclusively of the nickel–iron alloy kamacite and are lower in nickel content than the octahedrites. The nickel concentration in hexahedrites is always below 5.8% and only rarely below 5.3%.

The name comes from the cubic (i.e. hexahedron) structure of the kamacite crystal. After etching, hexahedrites do not display a Widmanstätten pattern, but they often do show Neumann lines: parallel lines that cross each other at various angles, and are indicative of impact shock on the parent body. These lines are named after politician Johann Georg Neumann who discovered them in 1848.

== Chemical classification ==
Concentrations of trace elements (germanium, gallium and iridium) are used to separate the iron meteorites into chemical classes, which correspond to separate asteroid parent bodies. Chemical classes that include hexahedrites are:

- IIAB meteorites (includes also some octahedrites)
- IIG meteorites

== See also ==
- Glossary of meteoritics
