= Plessite =

Alloy of iron and nickel found in meteorites

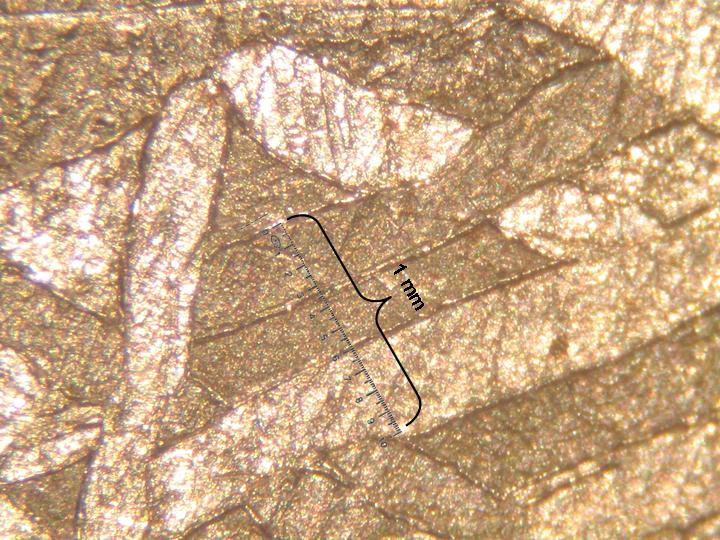
Plessite is the fine-grained material between the lamellae. Kaposfüred iron meteorite, Hungary.

Plessite is a meteorite texture consisting of a fine-grained mixture of the minerals kamacite and taenite found in the octahedrite iron meteorites. It occurs in gaps (its name is derived from the Greek "plythos" meaning "filling") between the larger bands of kamacite and taenite which form Widmanstätten patterns.

Many types of plessite exist and vary in formation mechanism and morphology. Some types of plessite as named by Buchwald's "Iron Meteorites" and Massalski's "Speculations about Plessite" are:

- acicular or type I plessite
- black or type II plessite
- cellular or type III plessite
- comb plessite
- net plessite
- pearlitic plessite
- spheroidized plessite

== See also ==
- Glossary of meteoritics
