= Neumann lines =

Patterns of parallel lines seen in cross-sections of many hexahedrite iron meteorites

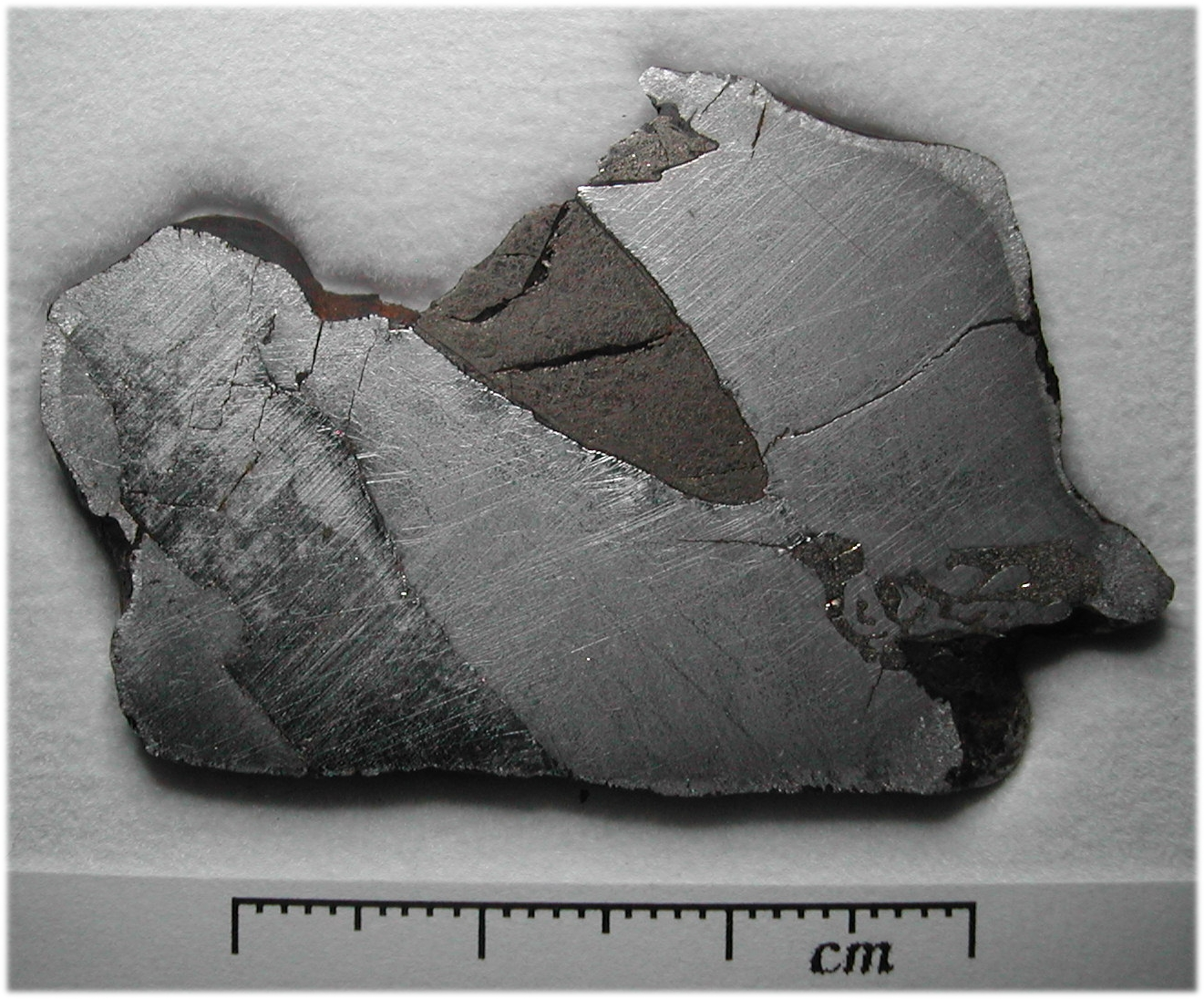
Neumann lines in an iron meteorite

Neumann lines, or Neumann bands, are fine patterns of parallel lines seen in cross-sections of many hexahedrite iron meteorites in the kamacite phase, although they may appear also in octahedrites provided the kamacite phase is about 30 micrometres wide. They can be seen after a polished meteorite cross-section is treated with acid. The lines are indicative of a shock-induced deformation of the kamacite crystal, and are thought to be due to impact events on the parent body of the meteorite.

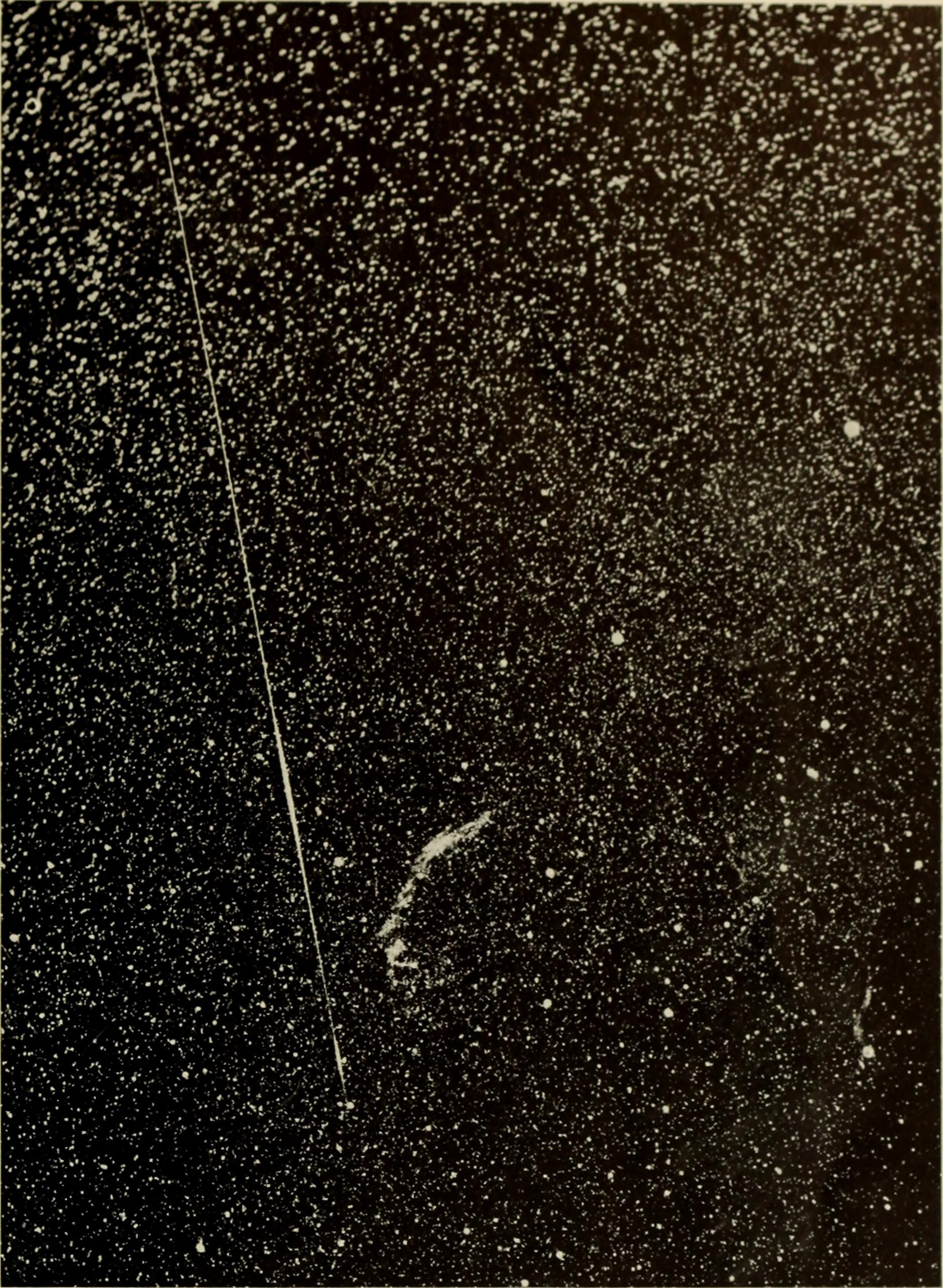
Iron meteorite showing relatively homegenous crystal formation with hexadedrite lamellae line, 1901

Neumann lines are named after Johann Georg Neumann who discovered them in 1848 in the hexahedrite meteorite which had fallen near Braunau (present-day Broumov, Czech Republic) in 1847.

== See also ==
- Glossary of meteoritics
- Widmanstätten pattern
