= Taenite =

Alloy of iron and nickel found in meteorites

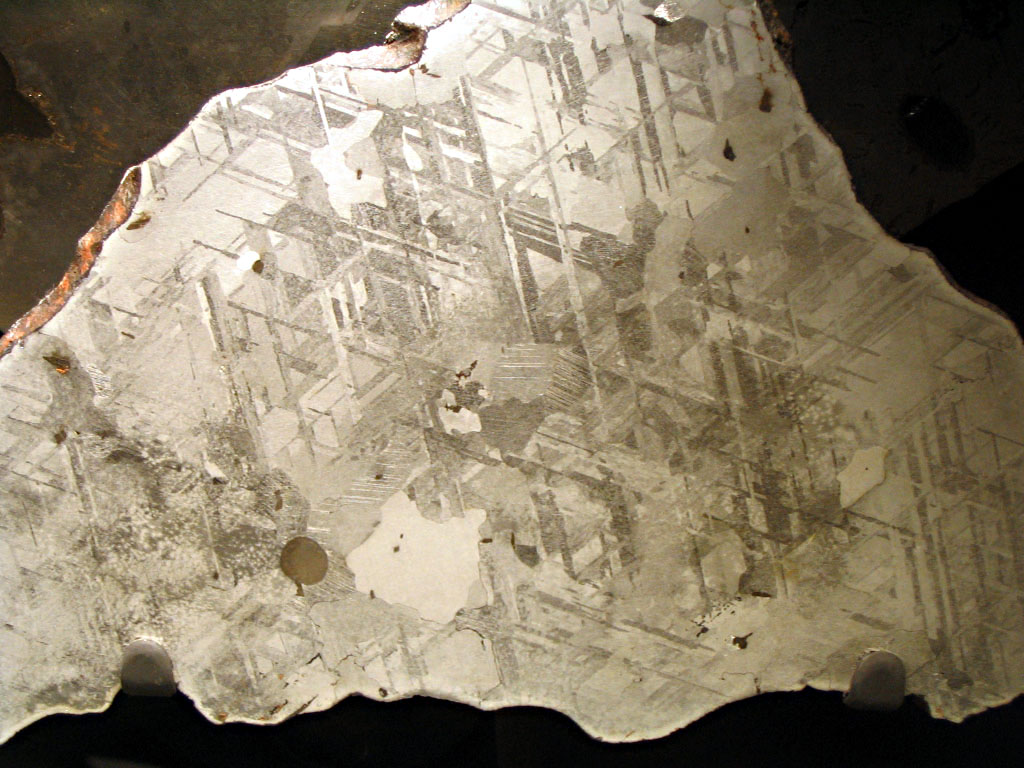
- Widmanstätten patterns of kamacite and taenite, from a meteorite currently in the Natural History Museum, London.

General
- Category: Metals and intermetallic alloys
- Formula: γ-(Ni,Fe)
- IMA symbol: Tae
- Strunz classification: 1.AE.10
- Crystal system: Isometric
- Crystal class: Hexoctahedral (m3̅m); H-M symbol: (4/m 3̅ 2/m)
- Space group: Fm3m

Identification
- Color: Metallic grayish to white
- Cleavage: None
- Fracture: Hackly
- Tenacity: Malleable, flexible
- Mohs scale hardness: 5–5.5
- Luster: Metallic
- Streak: Light gray
- Diaphaneity: Opaque
- Specific gravity: 7.8–8.22
- Other characteristics: Non-radioactive, magnetic.

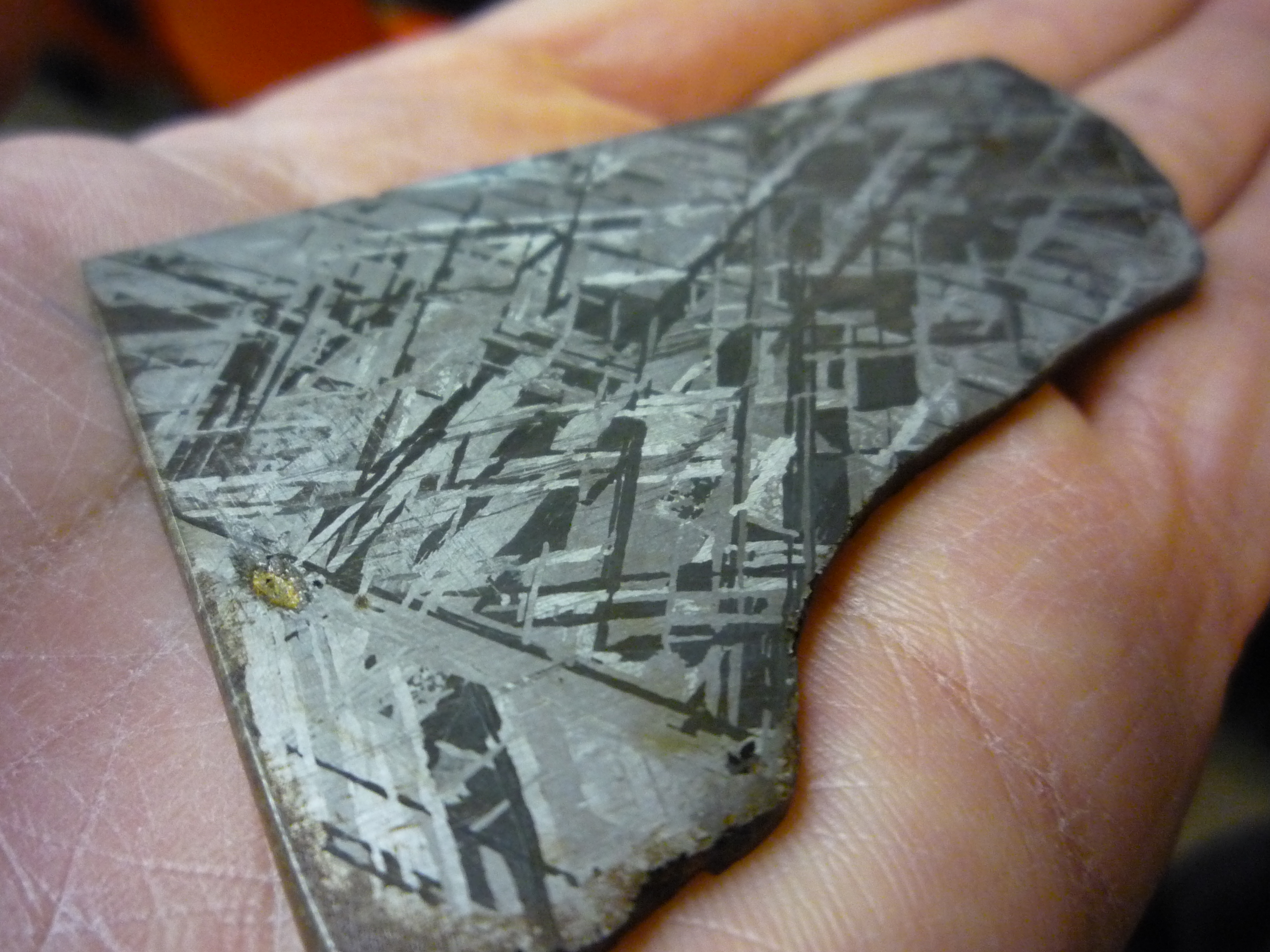
Widmanstätten pattern showing the two forms of Nickel-Iron, Kamacite and Taenite, in an octahedrite meteorite

Taenite is a mineral found naturally on Earth mostly in iron meteorites. It is an alloy of iron and nickel, with a chemical formula of Fe,Ni and nickel proportions of 20% up to 65%.

The name is derived from the Greek ταινία for "band, ribbon". Taenite is a major constituent of iron meteorites. In octahedrites it is found in bands interleaving with kamacite forming Widmanstätten patterns, whereas in ataxites it is the dominant constituent. In octahedrites a fine intermixture with kamacite can occur, which is called plessite.

Taenite is one of four known Fe-Ni meteorite minerals: The others are kamacite, tetrataenite, and antitaenite.

== Properties ==
It is opaque with a metallic grayish to white color. The structure is isometric-hexoctahedral (cubic). Its density is around 8 g/cm^{3} and hardness is 5 to 5.5 on the Mohs scale. Taenite is magnetic, in contrast to antitaenite. The structure is isometric-hexoctahedral (cubic). The crystal lattice has the c≈a=3.582±0.002 Å. The Strunz classification is I/A.08-20, while the Dana classification is 1.1.11.2.

== Meteorite localities with taenite ==
- Campo del Cielo strewn field in Argentina.
- Henbury Meteorites Conservation Reserve in Australia.
- Canyon Diablo in Arizona.

== See also ==
- Glossary of meteoritics
- List of minerals
