= Octahedrite =

Structural class of iron meteorites

- — Structural class —
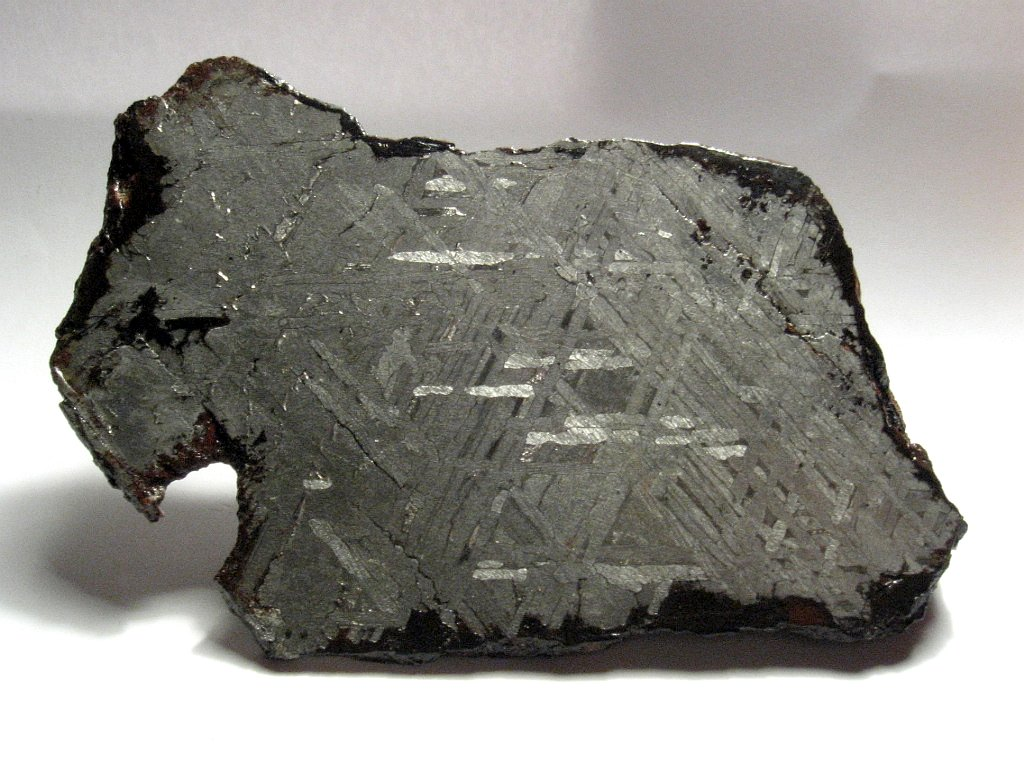
- Octahedrite from Toluca
- Compositional type: Iron
- A phase diagram showing the link between structural and chemical classification.

Octahedrites are the most common structural class of iron meteorites. The structures occur because the meteoric iron has a certain nickel concentration that leads to the exsolution of kamacite out of taenite while cooling.

== Structure ==
Octahedrites derive their name from the crystal structure paralleling an octahedron. Opposite faces are parallel so, although an octahedron has 8 faces, there are only 4 sets of kamacite plates.

Due to a long cooling time in the interior of the parent asteroids, these alloys have crystallized into intermixed millimeter-sized bands (from about 0.2 mm to 5 cm). When polished and acid etched the classic Widmanstätten patterns of intersecting lines of lamellar kamacite, are visible.

In gaps between the kamacite and taenite lamellae, a fine-grained mixture called plessite is often found. An iron nickel phosphide, schreibersite, is present in most nickel-iron meteorites, as well as an iron-nickel-cobalt carbide, cohenite. Graphite and troilite occur in rounded nodules up to several cm in size.

== Subgroups ==
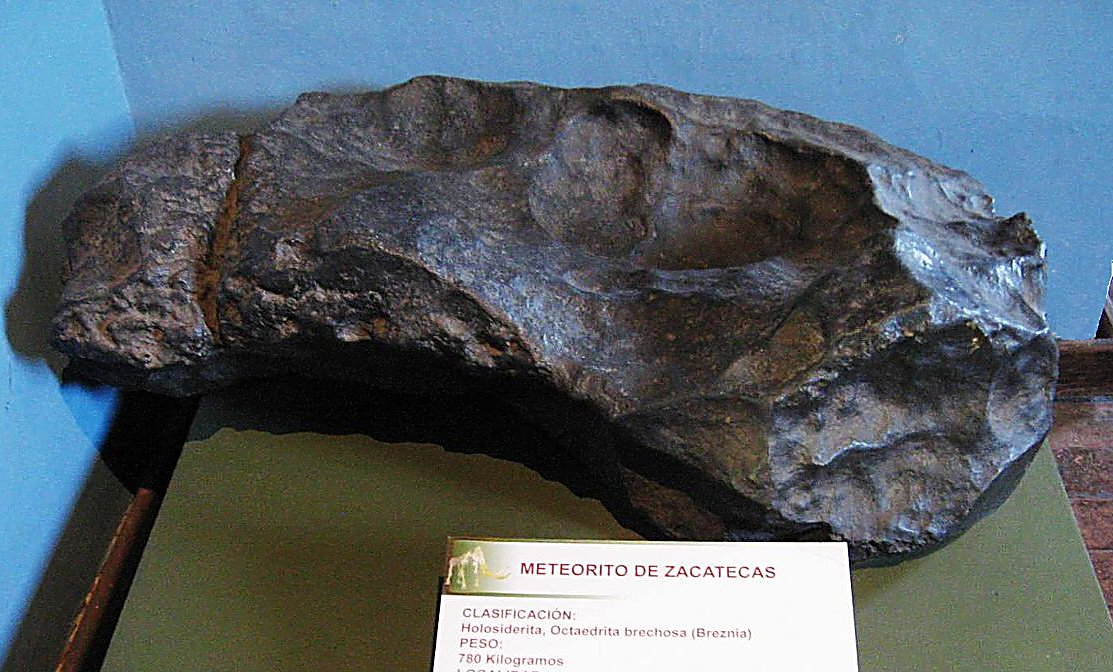
The Zacatecas Meteorite found in 1782 in Zacatecas Mexico, weighing 780kg.

Octahedrites can be grouped by the dimensions of kamacite lamellae in the Widmanstätten pattern, which are related to the nickel content:

- Coarsest octahedrites, lamellae width >3.3 mm, 5–9% Ni, symbol Ogg
- Coarse octahedrites, lamellae 1.3–3.3 mm, 6.5–8.5% Ni, symbol Og
- Medium octahedrites, lamellae 0.5–1.3 mm, 7–13% Ni, symbol Om
- Fine octahedrites, lamellae 0.2–0.5 mm, 7.5–13% Ni, symbol Of
- Finest octahedrites, lamellae <0.2 mm, 17–18% Ni, symbol Off
- Plessitic octahedrites, kamacite spindles, a transitional structure between octahedrites and ataxites, 9–18% Ni, symbol Opl

== Mineral ==
Octahedrite is an obsolete synonym for anatase, one of the three known titanium dioxide minerals.

== See also ==
- Glossary of meteoritics
