= Schreibersite =

Iron nickel phosphide mineral usually found in meteorites

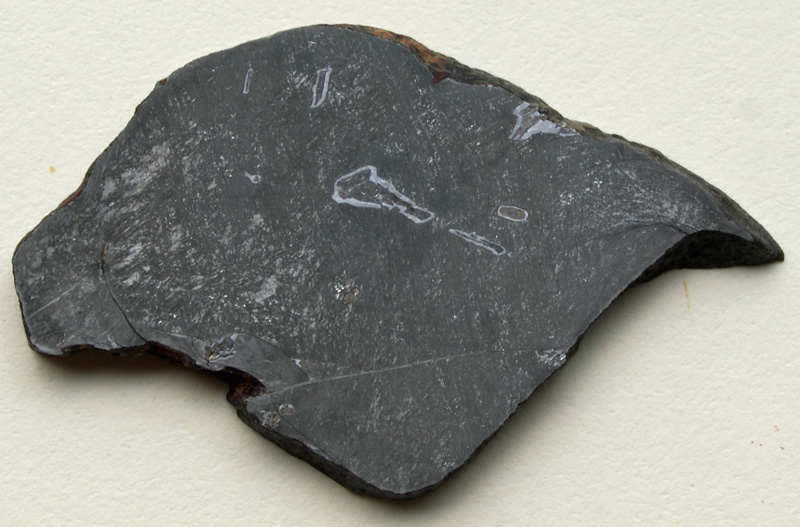

General
- Category: Phosphide mineral Meteorite mineral
- Formula: (Fe,Ni)_{3}P
- IMA symbol: Scb
- Strunz classification: 1.BD.05
- Dana classification: 01.01.21.02
- Crystal system: Tetragonal
- Crystal class: Disphenoidal (4̅); H-M symbol: (4̅)
- Space group: I4̅

Identification
- Color: Silver-white to tin-white, tarnishes brass-yellow or brown
- Crystal habit: Rarely in crystals, hoppered, plates, tablets, rods or needles
- Cleavage: {001} perfect, {010} indistinct, {110} indistinct
- Tenacity: Very brittle
- Mohs scale hardness: 6.5–7
- Luster: Brilliant metallic
- Streak: Dark gray
- Diaphaneity: Opaque
- Specific gravity: 7.0–7.3
- Optical properties: Uniaxial

Schreibersite is generally a rare iron nickel phosphide mineral, (Fe,Ni)_{3}P, though common in iron-nickel meteorites. It has been found on Disko Island in Greenland and Illinois.

Another name used for the mineral is rhabdite. It forms tetragonal crystals with perfect 001 cleavage. Its color ranges from bronze to brass yellow to silver white. It has a density of 7.5 and a hardness of 6.5 – 7. It is opaque with a metallic luster and a dark gray streak. It was named after the Austrian scientist Carl Franz Anton Ritter von Schreibers (1775–1852), who was one of the first to describe it from iron meteorites.

Schreibersite is reported from the Magura Meteorite, Arva-(present name – Orava), Slovak Republic; the Sikhote-Alin Meteorite in eastern Russia; the São Julião de Moreira Meteorite, Viana do Castelo, Portugal; the Gebel Kamil (meteorite) in Egypt; and numerous other locations including the Moon.

In 2007, researchers reported that schreibersite and other meteoric phosphorus bearing minerals may be the ultimate source for the phosphorus that is so important for life on Earth. In 2013, researchers reported that they had successfully produced pyrophosphite, a possible precursor to pyrophosphate, the molecule associated with ATP, a co-enzyme central to energy metabolism in all life on Earth. Their experiment consisted of subjecting a sample of schreibersite to a warm, acidic environment typically found in association with volcanic activity, activity that was far more common on the primordial Earth. They hypothesized that their experiment might represent what they termed "chemical life", a stage of evolution which may have led to the emergence of fully biological life as exists today.

Lightning strikes may have provided an alternative source of reduced phosphorus species for the synthesis of early biomolecules.

== See also ==
- Glossary of meteoritics
- List of minerals
- List of minerals named after people
