= Iron meteorite =

Meteorite composed of iron-nickel alloy called meteoric iron

- — Type —
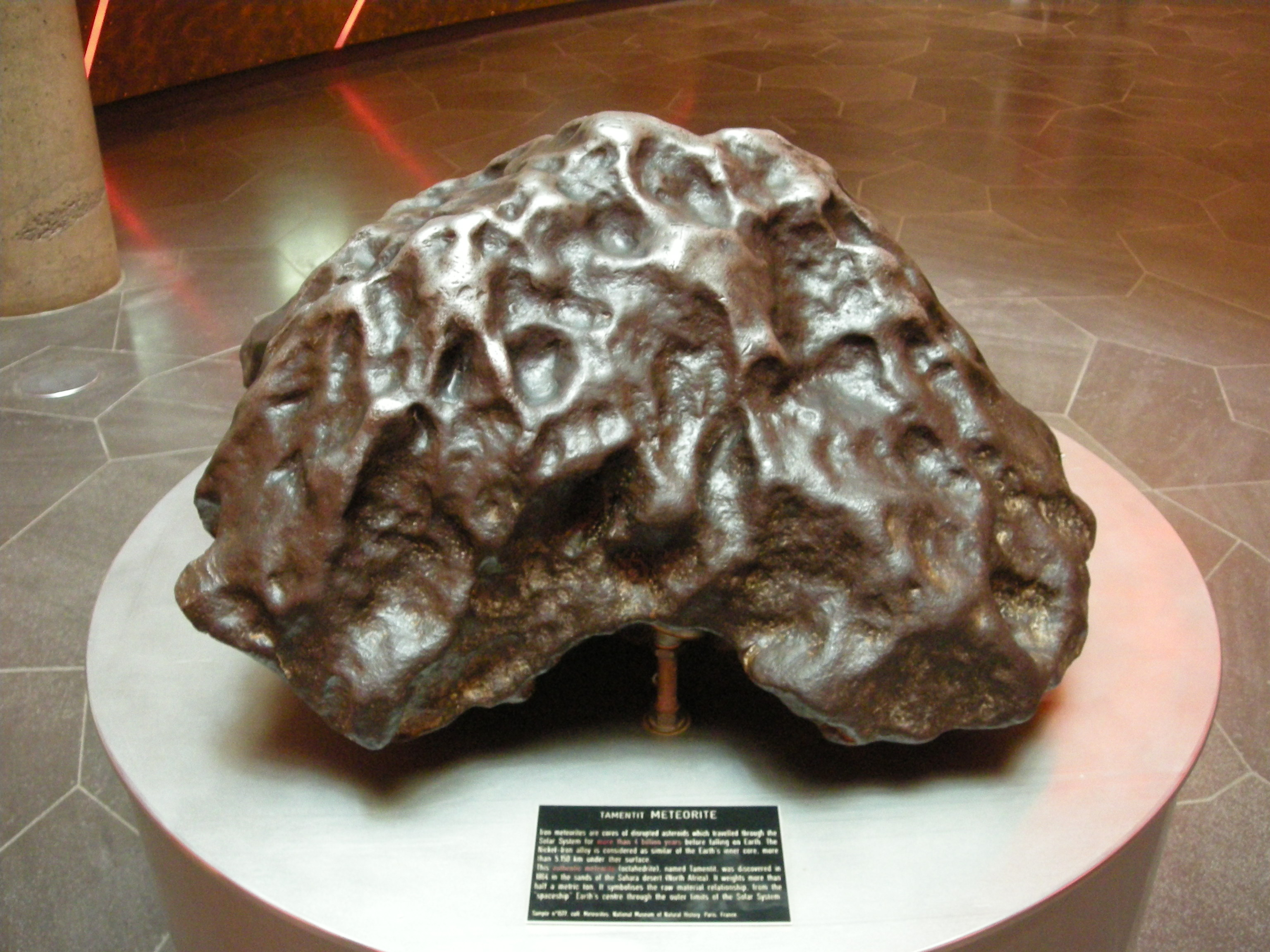
- Tamentit Iron Meteorite, found in 1864 in the Sahara, weighing about 500 kg (1,100 lb). On display at Vulcania park in France.
- Compositional type: Iron
- Parent body: >50
- Composition: >95% iron, nickel, and cobalt; 5–25% nickel
- TKW: c. 500 short tons (450 t)
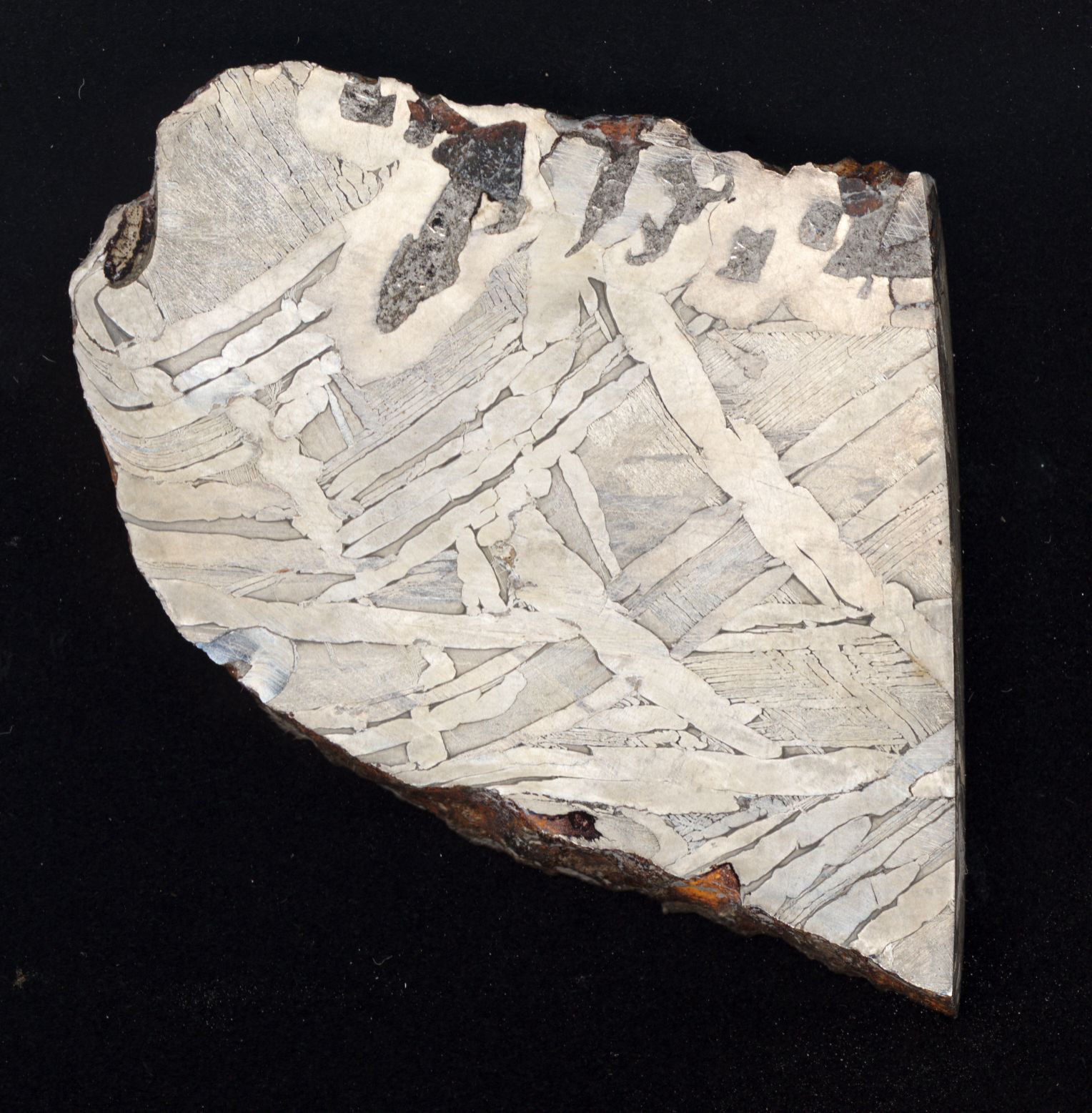
- Widmanstätten pattern as seen on an etched and polished slice of an olivine-free portion of the Seymchan meteorite. (Note: The Seymchan meteorite was initially considered a group IIE iron meteorite, but as new fragments were discovered it was reclassified as a stony-iron meteorite from the pallasite main group.) Scale unknown.

Iron meteorites, also called siderites or ferrous meteorites, are a type of meteorite consisting overwhelmingly of an iron–nickel alloy known as meteoric iron, which usually comprises two mineral phases: kamacite and taenite. Most iron meteorites originate from cores of planetesimals, with the exception of the IIE iron meteorite group.

The iron found in iron meteorites was one of the earliest sources of usable iron available to humans, due to the malleability and ductility of the meteoric iron, before the development of smelting that signaled the beginning of the Iron Age.

== Occurrence ==
Although they are fairly rare compared to the stony meteorites, comprising only about 5.7% of witnessed falls, iron meteorites have historically been heavily over-represented in meteorite collections. This is due to several factors:

- They are easily recognized as unusual, as opposed to stony meteorites. Modern-day searches for meteorites in deserts and Antarctica yield a much more representative sample of meteorites overall.
- They are much more resistant to weathering.
- They are much more likely to survive atmospheric entry, and are more resistant to the resulting ablation. Hence, they are more likely to be found as large pieces.
- They can be found even when buried by use of surface metal-detecting equipment, due to their metallic composition.

Because they are also denser than stony meteorites, iron meteorites also account for almost 90% of the mass of all known meteorites, about 500 tons. All the largest known meteorites are of this type, including the largest—the Hoba meteorite.

== Origin ==
Iron meteorites have been linked to M-type asteroids because both have similar spectral characteristics in the visible and near-infrared. Iron meteorites are thought to be the fragments of the cores of larger ancient asteroids that have been shattered by impacts. The heat released from the radioactive decay of the short-lived nuclides ^{26}Al and ^{60}Fe is considered as a plausible cause for the melting and differentiation of their parent bodies in the early Solar System. Melting produced from the heat of impacts is another cause of melting and differentiation. The IIE iron meteorites may be a notable exception, in that they probably originate from the crust of S-type asteroid 6 Hebe.

Chemical and isotope analysis indicates that at least about 50 distinct parent bodies were involved. This implies that there were once at least this many large, differentiated, asteroids in the asteroid belt – many more than today.

== Composition ==
The overwhelming bulk of these meteorites consists of the FeNi-alloys kamacite and taenite. Minor minerals, when occurring, often form rounded nodules of troilite or graphite, surrounded by schreibersite and cohenite. Schreibersite and troilite also occur as plate shaped inclusions, which show up on cut surfaces as cm-long and mm-thick lamellae. The troilite plates are called Reichenbach lamellae.

The chemical composition is dominated by the elements Fe, Ni and Co, which make up more than 95%. Ni is always present; the concentration is nearly always higher than 5% and may be as high as about 25%. A significant percentage of nickel can be used in the field to distinguish meteoritic irons from human-made iron products, which usually contain lower amounts of Ni, but it is not enough to prove meteoritic origin.

== Use ==
Iron meteorites were historically used for their meteoric iron, which was forged into cultural objects, tools or weapons. With the advent of smelting and the beginning of the Iron Age the importance of iron meteorites as a resource decreased, at least in those cultures that developed those techniques. In Ancient Egypt and other civilizations before the Iron Age, iron was as valuable as gold, since both came from meteorites, for example Tutankhamun's meteoric iron dagger. The Inuit used the Cape York meteorite for a much longer time. Iron meteorites themselves were sometimes used unaltered as collectibles or even religious symbols (e.g. Clackamas worshiping the Willamette meteorite). Today iron meteorites are prized collectibles for academic institutions and individuals. Some are also tourist attractions as in the case of the Hoba meteorite.

== Classification ==
Two classifications are in use: the classic structural classification and the newer chemical classification.

=== Structural classification ===
The older structural classification is based on the presence or absence of the Widmanstätten pattern, which can be assessed from the appearance of polished cross-sections that have been etched with acid. This is connected with the relative abundance of nickel to iron. The categories are:

- Hexahedrites (H): low nickel, no Widmanstätten pattern, may present Neumann lines;
- Octahedrites (O): average to high nickel, Widmanstätten patterns, most common class. They can be further divided up on the basis of the width of the kamacite lamellae from coarsest to finest.
  - Coarsest (Ogg): lamellae width > 3.3 mm
  - Coarse (Og): lamellae width 1.3–3.3 mm
  - Medium (Om): lamellae width 0.5–1.3 mm
  - Fine (Of): lamellae width 0.2–0.5 mm
  - Finest (Off): lamellae width < 0.2 mm
- Plessitic (Opl): a transitional structure between octahedrites and ataxites
- Ataxites (D): very high nickel, no Widmanstätten pattern, rare.

=== Chemical classification ===
A newer chemical classification scheme based on the proportions of the trace elements Ga, Ge and Ir separates the iron meteorites into classes corresponding to distinct asteroid parent bodies. This classification is based on diagrams that plot nickel content against different trace elements (e.g. Ga, Ge and Ir). The different iron meteorite groups appear as data point clusters.

There were originally four of these groups designated by the Roman numerals I, II, III, IV. When more chemical data became available these were split, e.g. Group IV was split into IVA and IVB meteorites. Even later some groups got joined again when intermediate meteorites were discovered, e.g. IIIA and IIIB were combined into the IIIAB meteorites.

In 2006 iron meteorites were classified into 13 groups (plus one for uncategorized irons):

- IAB
  - IA: Medium and coarse octahedrites, 6.4–8.7% Ni, 55–100 ppm Ga, 190–520 ppm Ge, 0.6–5.5 ppm Ir, Ge-Ni correlation negative.
  - IB: Ataxites and medium octahedrites, 8.7–25% Ni, 11–55 ppm Ga, 25–190 ppm Ge, 0.3–2 ppm Ir, Ge-Ni correlation negative.
- IC: 6.1–6.8% Ni. The Ni concentrations are positively correlated with As (4–9 μg/g), Au (0.6–1.0 μg/g) and P (0.17–0.40%) and negatively correlated with Ga (54–42 μg/g), Ir (9–0.07 μg/g) and W (2.4–0.8 μg/g).
- IIAB
  - IIA: Hexahedrites, 5.3–5.7% Ni, 57–62 ppm Ga, 170–185 ppm Ge, 2–60 ppm Ir.
  - IIB: Coarsest octahedrites, 5.7–6.4% Ni, 446–59 pm Ga, 107–183 ppm Ge, 0.01–0.5 ppm Ir, Ge-Ni correlation negative.
- IIC: Plessitic octahedrites, 9.3–11.5% Ni, 37–39 ppm Ga, 88–114 ppm Ge, 4–11 ppm Ir, Ge-Ni correlation positive
- IID: Fine to medium octahedrites, 9.8–11.3%Ni, 70–83 ppm Ga, 82–98 ppm Ge, 3.5–18 ppm Ir, Ge-Ni correlation positive
- IIE: octahedrites of various coarseness, 7.5–9.7% Ni, 21–28 ppm Ga, 60–75 ppm Ge, 1–8 ppm Ir, Ge-Ni correlation absent
- IIIAB: Medium octahedrites, 7.1–10.5% Ni, 16–23 ppm Ga, 27–47 ppm Ge, 0.01–19 ppm Ir
- IIICD: Ataxites to fine octahedrites, 10–23% Ni, 1.5–27 ppm Ga, 1.4–70 ppm Ge, 0.02–0.55 ppm Ir
- IIIE: Coarse octahedrites, 8.2–9.0% Ni, 17–19 ppm Ga, 3–37 ppm Ge, 0.05–6 ppm Ir, Ge-Ni correlation absent
- IIIF: Medium to coarse octahedrites, 6.8–7.8% Ni,6.3–7.2 ppm Ga, 0.7–1.1 ppm Ge, 1.3–7.9 ppm Ir, Ge–Ni correlation absent
- IVA: Fine octahedrites, 7.4–9.4% Ni, 1.6–2.4 ppm Ga, 0.09–0.14 ppm Ge, 0.4–4 ppm Ir, Ge-Ni correlation positive
- IVB: Ataxites, 16–26% Ni, 0.17–0.27 ppm Ga, 0,03–0,07 ppm Ge, 13–38 ppm Ir, Ge–Ni correlation positive
- Ungrouped meteorites. This is actually quite a large collection (about 15% of the total) of over 100 meteorites that do not fit into any of the larger classes above, and come from about 50 distinct parent bodies.

Additional groups and grouplets are discussed in the scientific literature:

- IIG: Hexahedrites with coarse schreibersite. Meteoric iron has low nickel concentration.

==== Magmatic and nonmagmatic (primitive) irons ====
The iron meteorites were previously divided into two classes: magmatic irons and non magmatic or primitive irons. Now this definition is deprecated.

Iron class	Groups
Nonmagmatic or primitive iron meteorites	IAB, IIE
Magmatic iron meteorites	IC, IIAB, IIC, IID, IIF, IIG, IIIAB, IIIE, IIIF, IVA, IVB

==== Stony–iron meteorites ====
There are also specific categories for mixed-composition meteorites, in which iron and 'stony' materials are combined.

- Stony–iron meteorites
  - Pallasites
    - Main group pallasites
    - Eagle station pallasite grouplet
    - Pyroxene Pallasite grouplet
  - Mesosiderite group

== Gallery ==
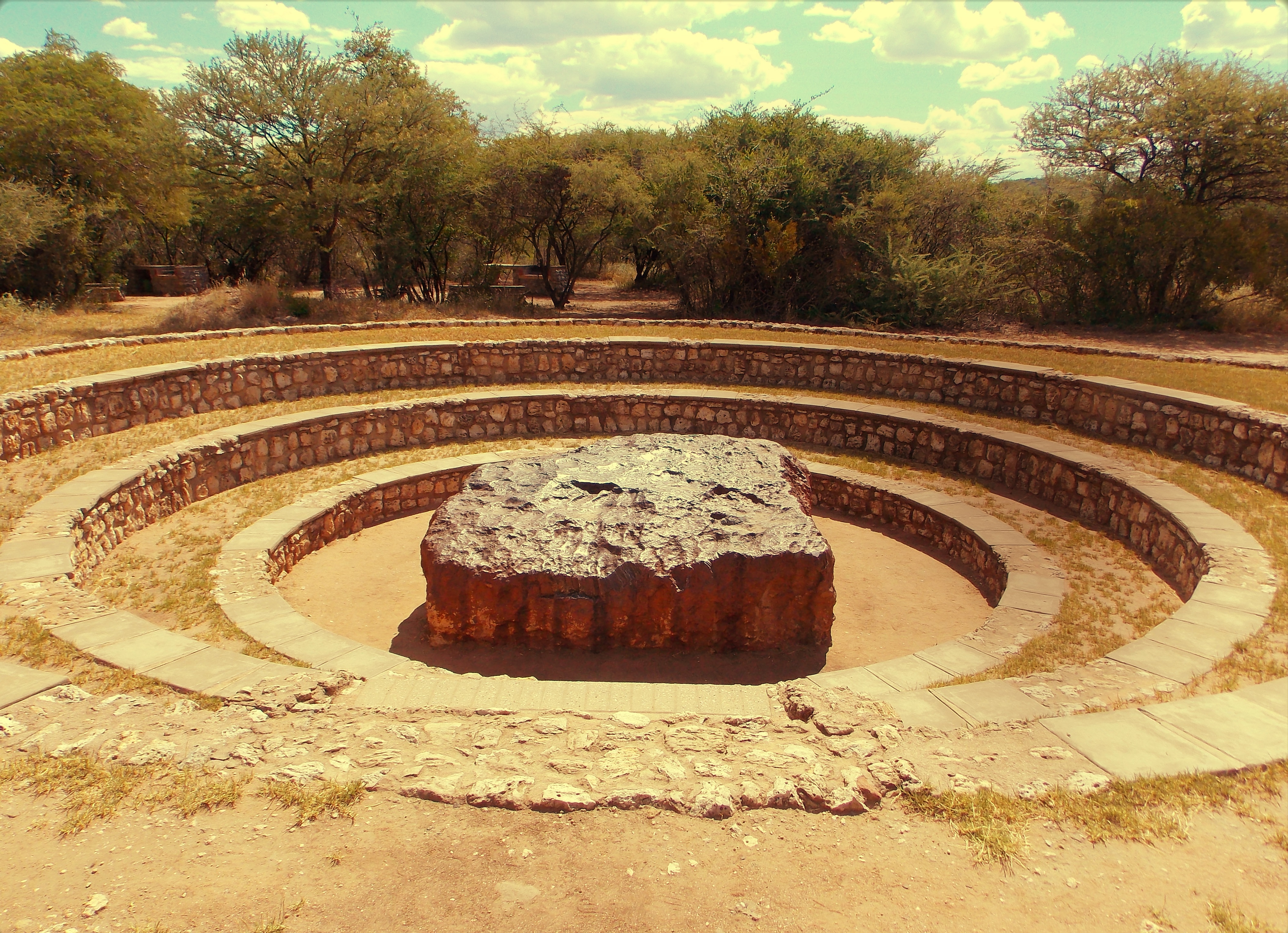
The Hoba meteorite, the biggest known iron meteorite. It lies in Namibia and weighs about 60 tons.

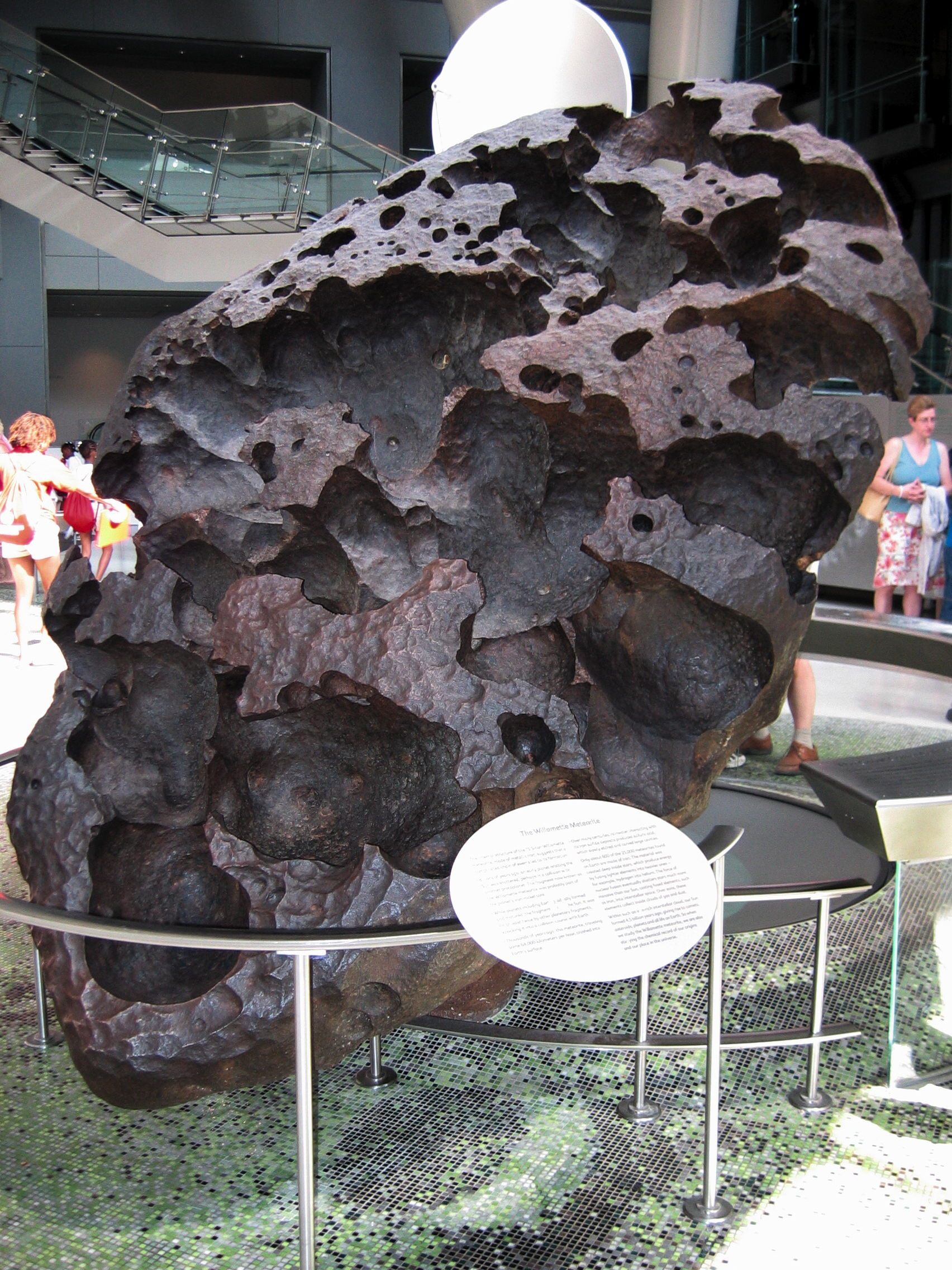
The Willamette Meteorite on display at the American Museum of Natural History. It weighs about 14,500 kilograms (32,000 pounds). This is the largest meteorite ever found in the United States.

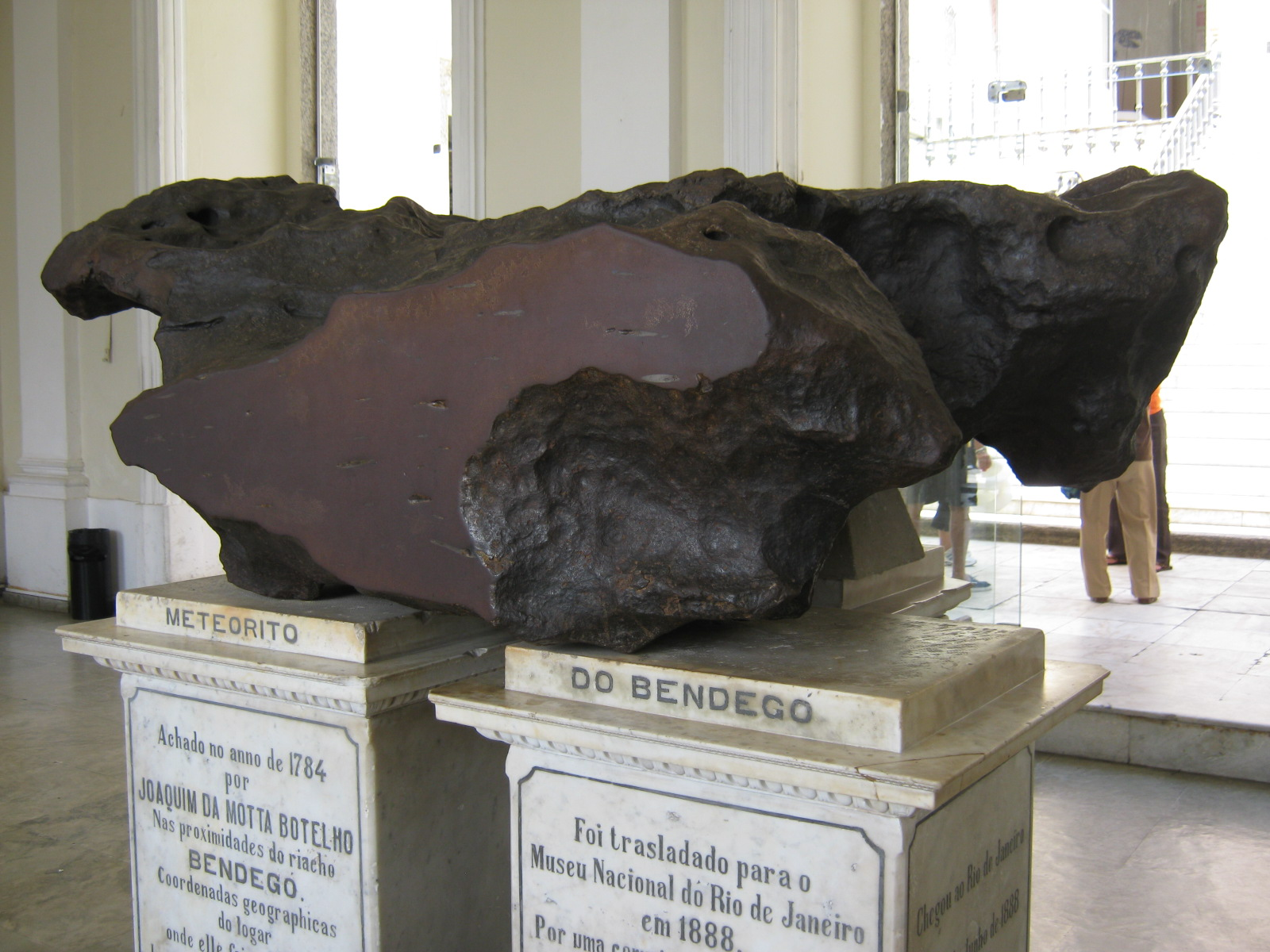
The Bendegó meteorite, weighing 5,360 kilograms (11,600 pounds), was found in 1784 and brought in 1888 to its current location at National Museum of Brazil in Rio de Janeiro. It is the largest meteorite ever found in Brazil.

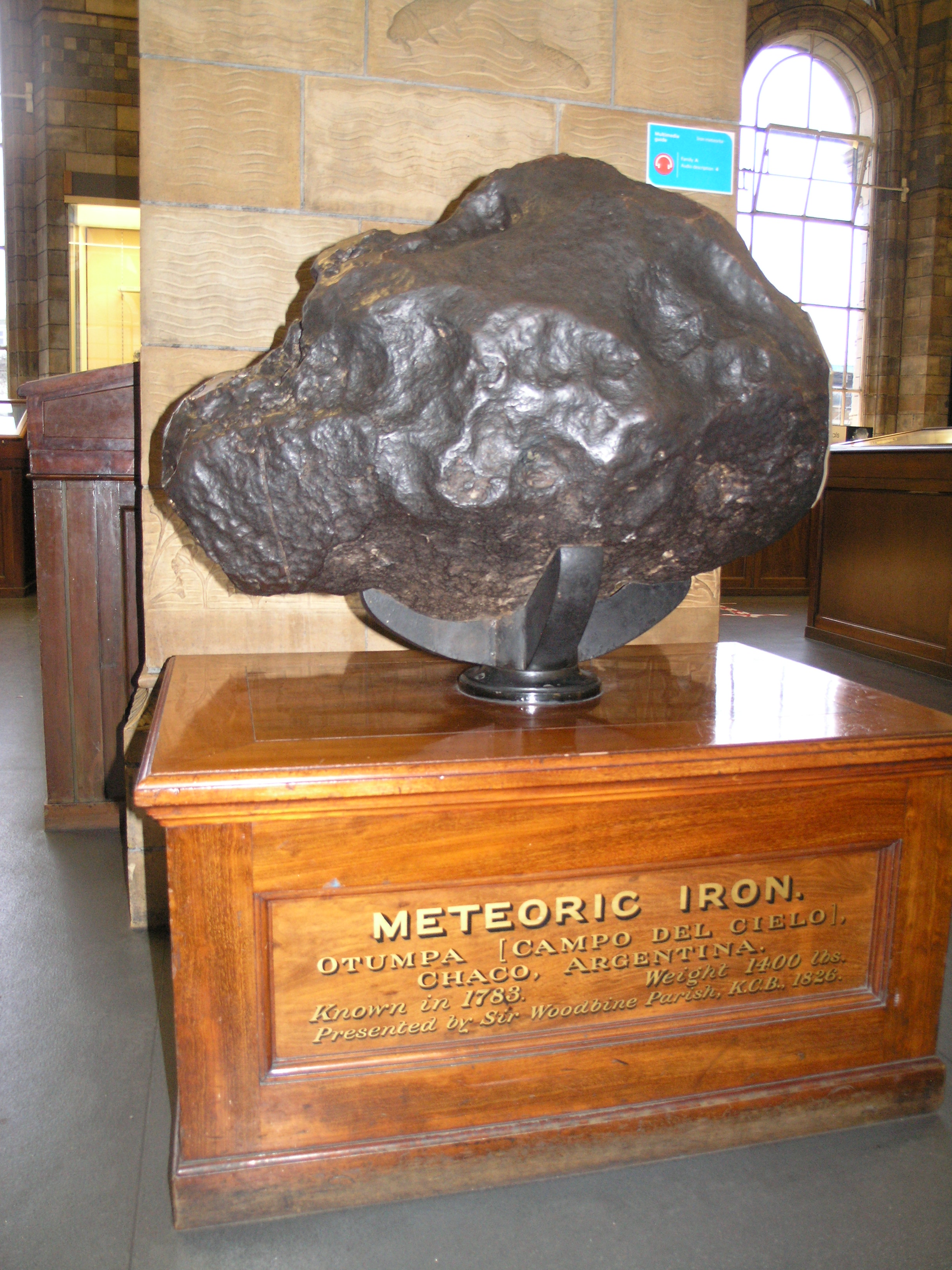
The Otumpa mass, meteoric iron weighing 635 kilograms (1,400 pounds), from the Campo del Cielo, exhibited in the Natural History Museum, London, found in 1783 in Chaco, Argentina.

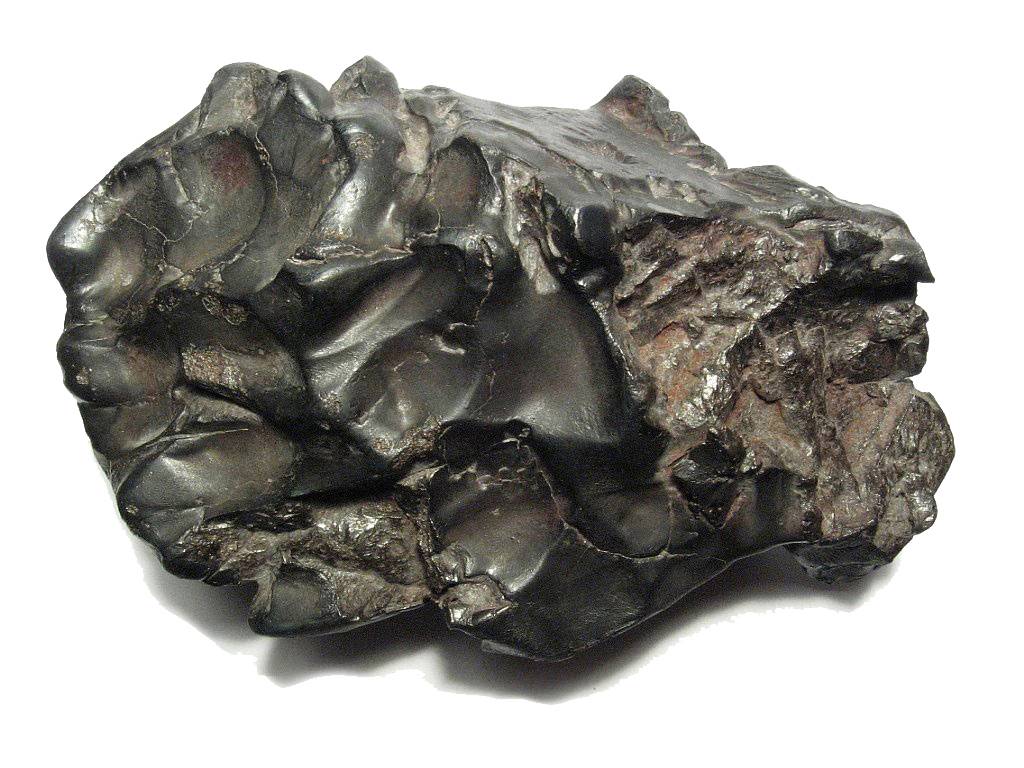
A 1.7-kilogram (3.7 lb) individual meteorite from the 1947 Sikhote-Alin meteorite shower (coarsest octahedrite, class IIAB). This specimen is about 12 centimetres (4.7 in) wide.

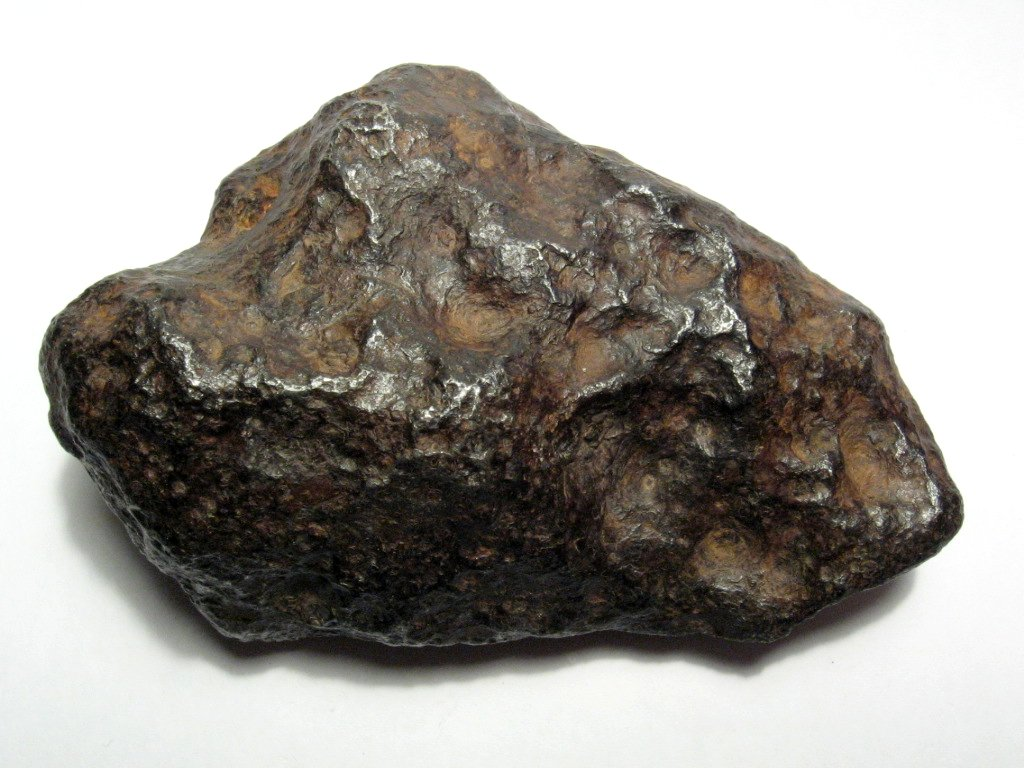
A 700-gram (25 oz) individual Chinga iron meteorite (Ataxite, class IVB). This specimen is about 9 centimeters wide.

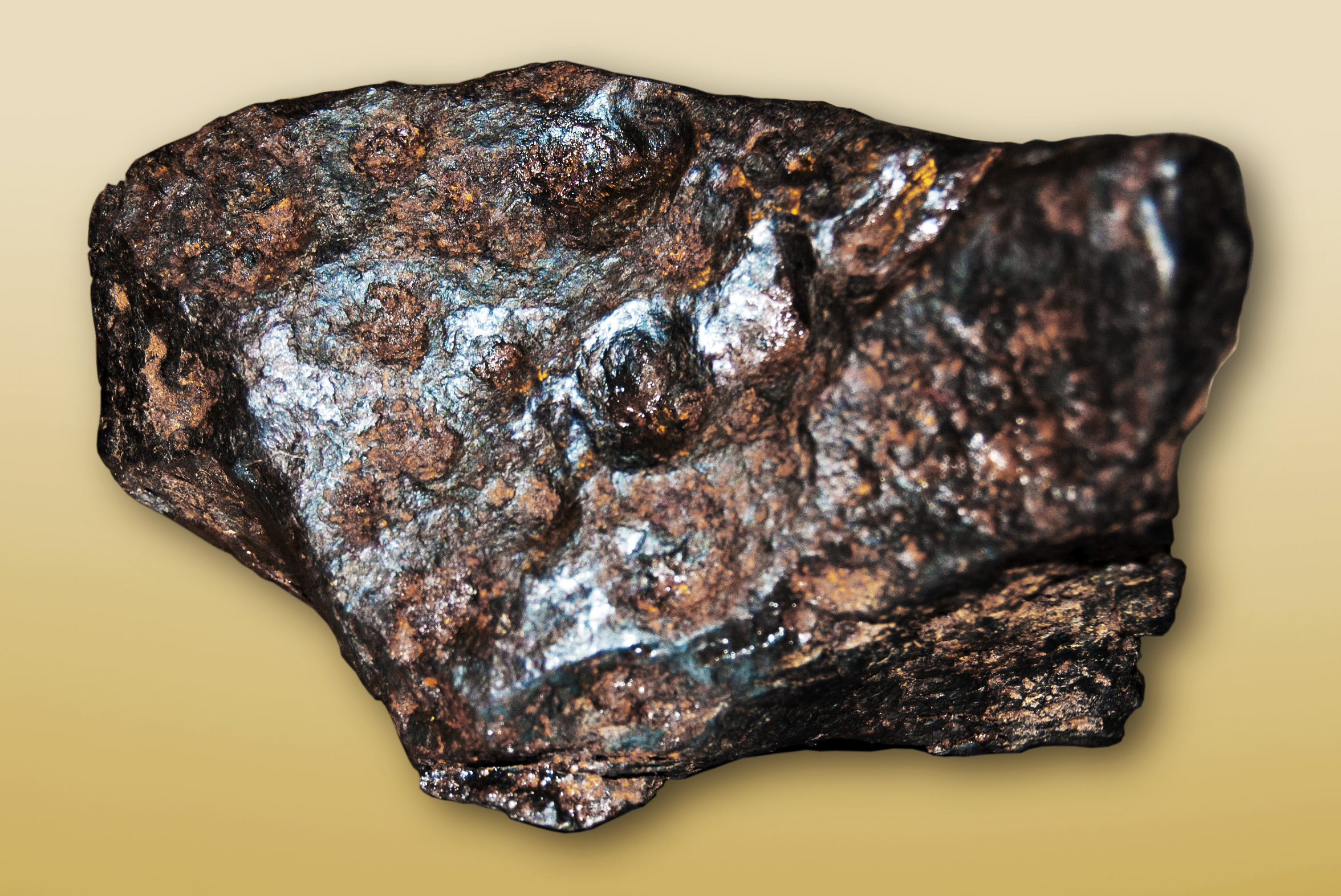
Meteorite fragment from the Cañon Diablo Meteorite 90mm wide

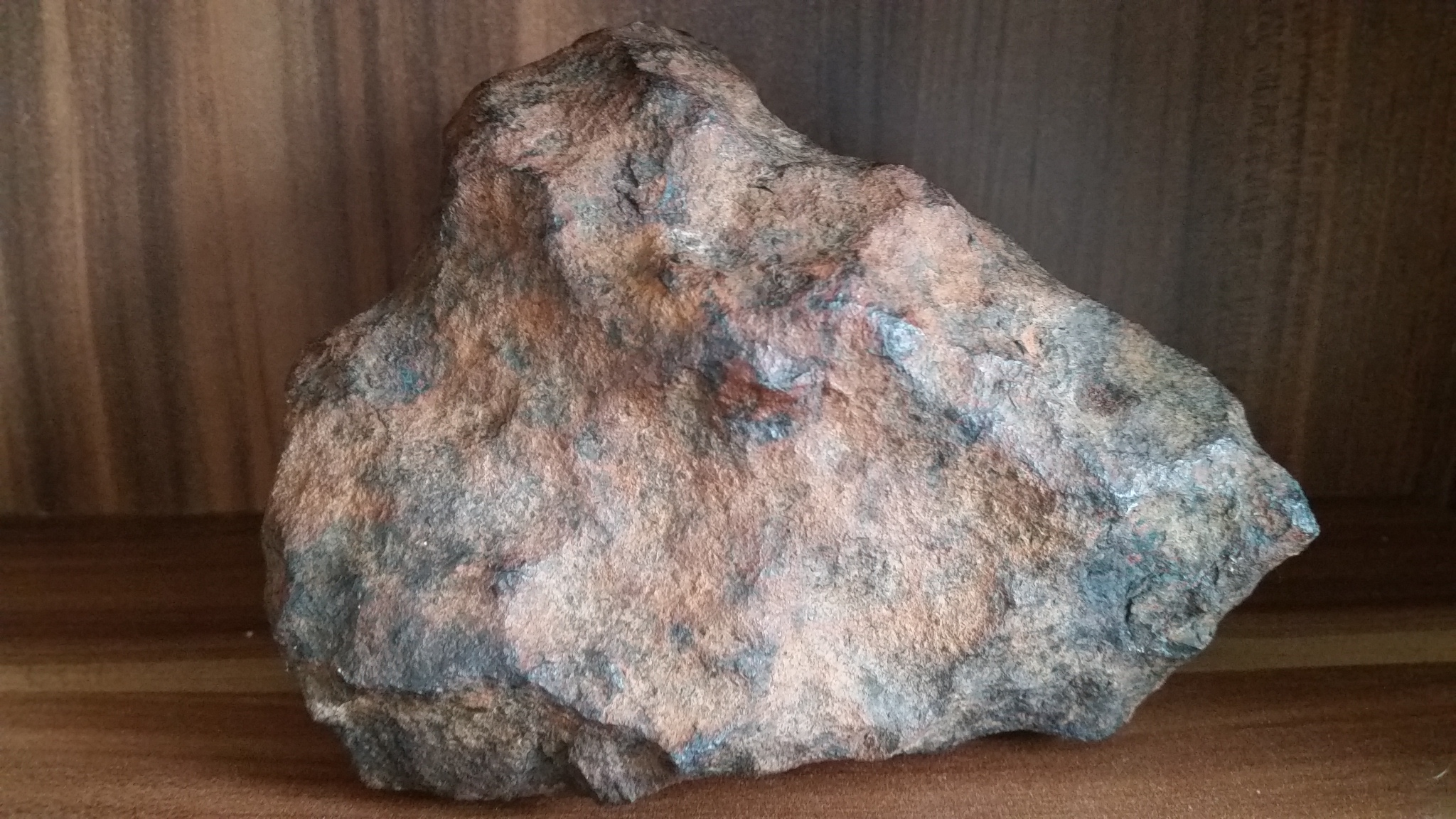
The Gibeon meteorite: Year found: 1836, Country: Namibia, individual weighing 3986 grams. This specimen is in the private collection of Howardite meteorites.

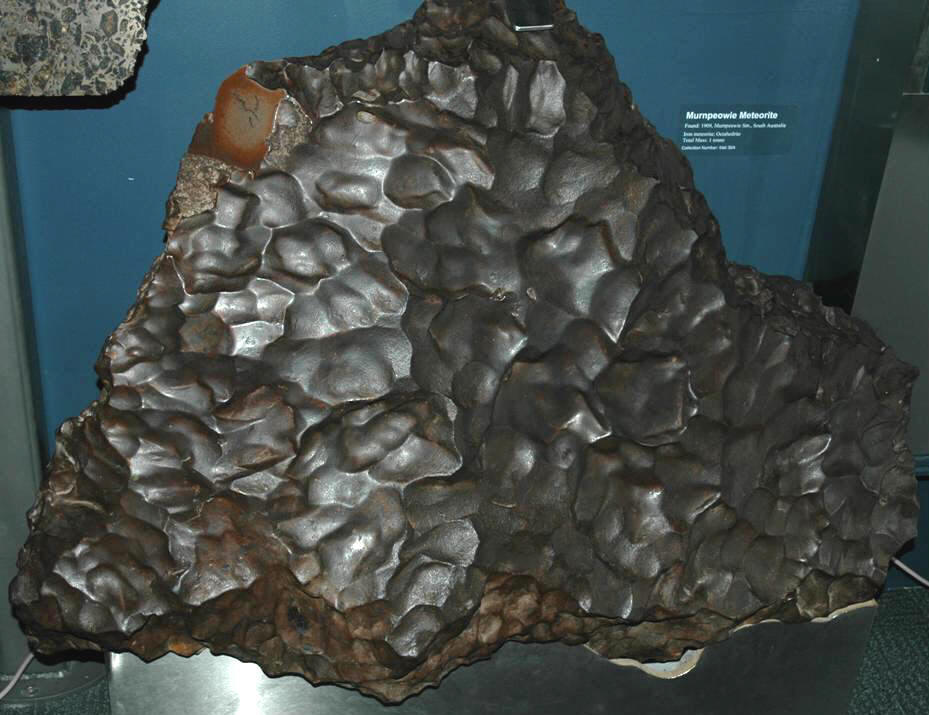
The Murnpeowie meteorite, with regmaglypts resembling thumbprints, discovered on Murnpeowie Station, South Australia in 1910.

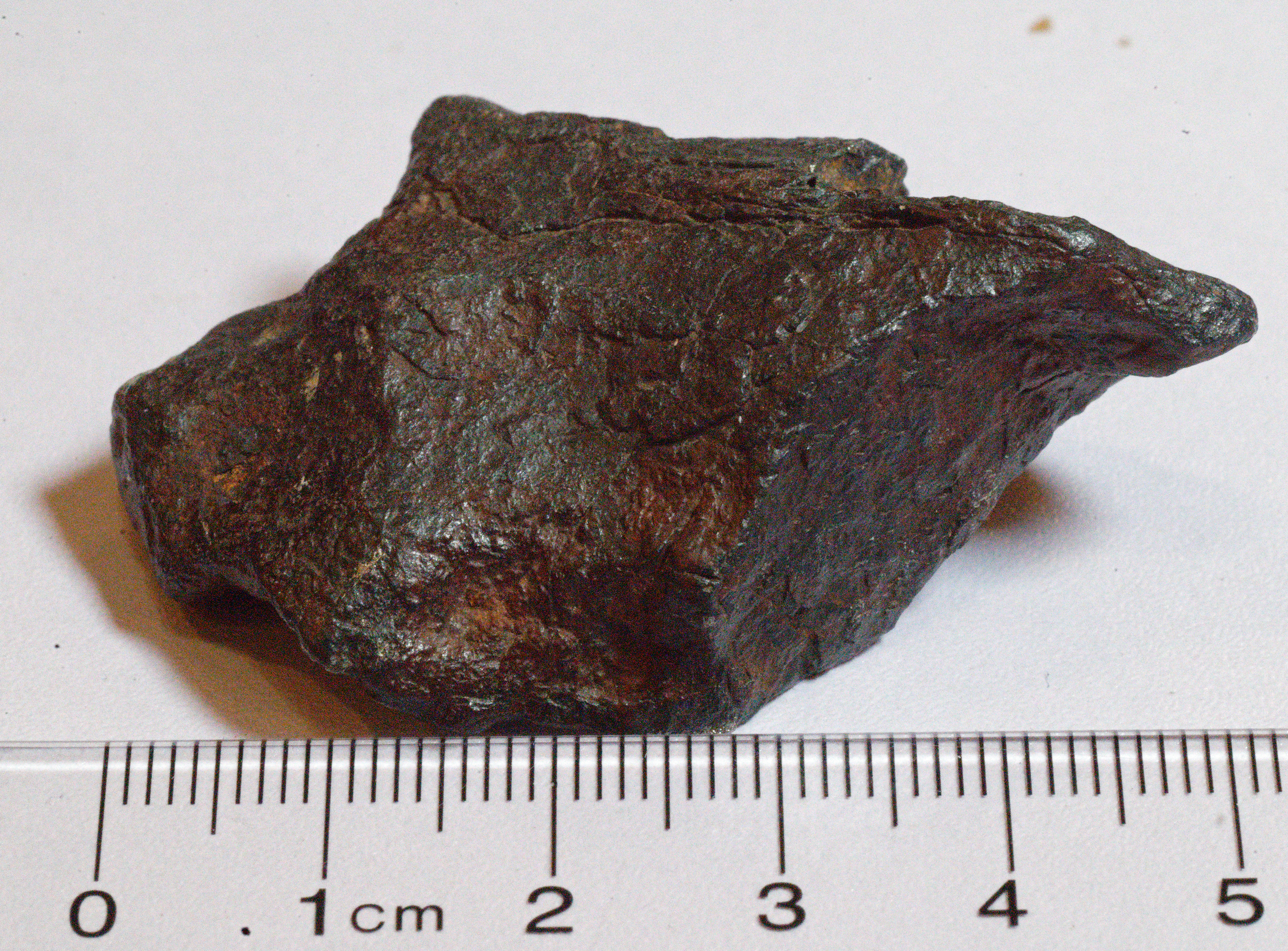
Iron meteorite, 5 cm long, weighing 77 grams

== See also ==
- Glossary of meteoritics
- Hraschina meteorite
- Meteoritics
