= Kamacite =

Alloy of iron and nickel found in meteorites

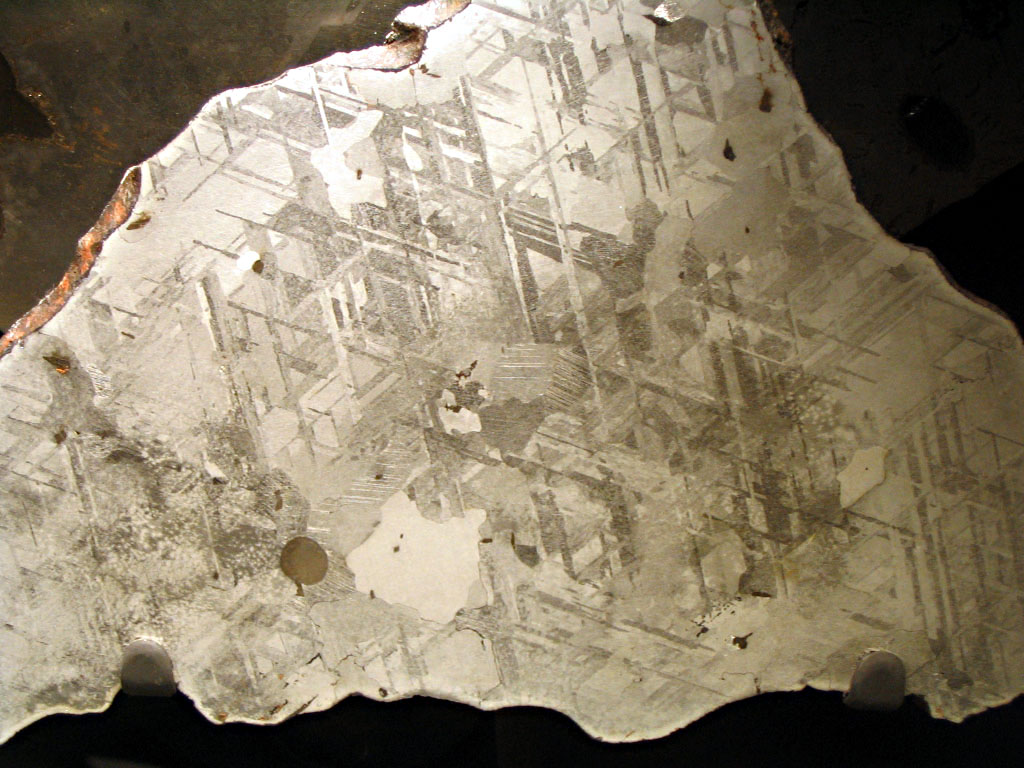
- Widmanstätten pattern showing the two forms of nickel-iron minerals, kamacite and taenite

General
- Category: Meteorite mineral
- Formula: α-(Fe,Ni); Fe^{0}_{0.9}Ni^{0}_{0.1}
- Strunz classification: 1.AE.05
- Crystal system: Isometric
- Crystal class: Hexoctahedral (m3̅m); H-M symbol: (4/m 3̅ 2/m)
- Space group: Im3̅m

Identification
- Formula mass: 56.13 g/mol
- Color: Iron black, steel gray
- Crystal habit: Massive – uniformly indistinguishable crystals forming large masses
- Cleavage: Indistinct
- Fracture: Hackly – Jagged, torn surfaces, (e.g. fractured metals).
- Mohs scale hardness: 4
- Luster: Metallic
- Streak: Gray
- Specific gravity: 7.9
- Other characteristics: Non-radioactive, magnetic, Non-fluorescent.

Kamacite is an alloy of iron and nickel, which is found on Earth only in meteorites. According to the International Mineralogical Association (IMA) it is considered a proper nickel-rich variety of the mineral native iron. The proportion iron:nickel is between 90%:10% and 95%:5%; small quantities of other elements, such as cobalt or carbon may also be present. The mineral has a metallic luster, is gray and has no clear cleavage although its crystal structure is isometric-hexoctahedral. Its density is about 8 g/cm^{3} and its hardness is 4 on the Mohs scale. It is also sometimes called balkeneisen.

The name was coined in 1861 and is derived from the Greek root καμακ- "kamak" or κάμαξ "kamaks", meaning vine-pole. It is a major constituent of iron meteorites (octahedrite and hexahedrite types). In the octahedrites it is found in bands interleaving with taenite forming Widmanstätten patterns. In hexahedrites, fine parallel lines called Neumann lines are often seen, which are evidence for structural deformation of adjacent kamacite plates due to shock from impacts.

At times kamacite can be found so closely intermixed with taenite that it is difficult to distinguish them visually, forming plessite. The largest documented kamacite crystal measured 92×54×23 cm (36.2×21.3×9.1 in).

== Physical properties ==
Kamacite has many unique physical properties including Widmanstätten pattern and extremely high density.

=== Identification ===
Kamacite is opaque, and its surface generally displays varying shades of gray streaking, or "quilting" patterns. Kamacite has a metallic luster. Kamacite can vary in hardness based on the extent of shock it has undergone, but commonly ranks a four on the mohs hardness scale. Shock increases kamacite hardness, but this is not 100% reliable in determining shock histories as there are myriad other reasons that the hardness of kamacite could increase.

Kamacite has a measured density of 7.9 g/cm^{3}. It has a massive crystal habit but normally individual crystals are indistinguishable in natural occurrences. There are no planes of cleavage present in kamacite which gives it a hackly fracture. Kamacite is magnetic, and isometric which makes it behave optically isometrically.

Kamacite occurs with taenite and a mixed area of kamacite and taenite referred to as plessite.

Taenite contains more nickel (12 to 45 wt. % Ni) than kamacite (which has 5 to 12 wt. % Ni). The increase in nickel content causes taenite to have a face-centered unit cell, whereas kamacite's higher iron content causes its unit cell to be body centered. This difference is caused by nickel and iron having a similar size but different interatomic magnetic and quantum interactions.

==== Tetragonal phase ====
There is evidence of a tetragonal phase, observed in X-ray powder tests and later under a microscope. When tested two meteorites gave d-values that could "be indexed on the basis of a tetragonal unit cell, but not on the basis of a cubic or hexagonal unit cell". It has been speculated to be e-iron, a hexagonal polymorph of iron.

=== Widmanstätten patterns ===
Widmanstätten pattern, sometimes referred to as Thomson pattern, are textures often seen in meteorites that contain kamacite. These are bands which are usually alternating between kamacite and taenite. In 1804, William Thomson stumbled upon these structures when he noticed unexpected geometric patterns after cleaning a specimen with nitric acid (HNO_{3}). He published his observations in a French journal but due to the Napoleonic wars the English scientists, who were doing much of the meteorite research of the time, never discovered his work. It was not until 1808, four years later, that the same etching patterns were discovered by Count Alois von Beck Widmanstätten who was heating iron meteorites when he noticed geometric patterns caused by the differing oxidation rates of kamacite and taenite. Widmanstätten told many of his colleagues about these patterns in correspondence leading to them being referred to as Widmanstätten patterns in most literature.

Widmanstätten patterns are created as the meteorite cools; at high temperatures both iron and nickel have face-centered lattices. When the meteorite is formed it starts out as entirely molten taenite (greater than 1500 °C) and as it cools past 723 °C the primary metastable phase of the alloy changes into taenite and kamacite begins to precipitate out. It is in this window where the meteorite is cooling below 723 °C where the Thomson structures form and they can be greatly affected by the temperature, pressure, and composition of the meteorite.

=== Optical properties ===
Kamacite is opaque and can be observed only in reflected light microscopy. It is isometric and therefore behaves isotropically.

=== Magnetism ===
As the meteorite cools below 750 °C iron becomes magnetic as it moves into the kamacite phase. During this cooling the meteorite takes on non-conventional thermoremanent magnetization. Thermoremanent magnetization on Earth gives iron minerals formed in the Earth's crust, a higher magnetization than if they were formed in the same field at room temperature. This is a non-conventional thermoremanent magnetization because it appears to be due to a chemical remanent process which is induced as taenite is cooled to kamacite. What makes this especially interesting is this has been shown to account for all of the ordinary chondrites magnetic field which has been shown to be as strong as 0.4 oersted (symbol Oe).

== Crystallography ==
Kamacite is an isometric mineral with a body cubic centered unit cell. Kamacite is usually not found in large crystals; however the anomalously largest kamacite crystal found and documented measured 92×54×23 centimeters. Even with large crystals being so rare, crystallography is extremely important to understand plays an important role in the formation of Thomson structures.

=== Symmetry ===
Kamacite forms isometric, hexoctahedral crystals; this causes the crystals to have many symmetry elements. Kamacite falls under the 4/m3̅2/m class in the Hermann–Mauguin notation meaning it has three fourfold axes, four threefold axes, and six twofold axes and nine mirror planes. Kamacite has a space group of Fm3̅m.

=== Unit cell ===
Kamacite is made up of a repeating unit of α-(Fe, Ni), Fe_{0.9}Ni_{0.1}, which makes up cell dimensions of a = 8.603 Å, Z = 54 Å; V = 636.72 Å^{3}. The interatomic magnetic and quantum interactions of the zerovalent iron (metallic Fe^{0}) atoms interacting with each other causes kamacite to have a body centered lattice.

== Chemistry ==
=== Formula and dominant elements ===
Kamacite is made up of a repeating unit of α-(Fe, Ni), Fe_{0.9}Ni_{0.1}, in which both iron and nickel have the valence zero (Fe^{0} and Ni^{0}) as they are metallic native elements commonly found in iron meteorites. Besides trace elements, it is normally considered to be made up of 90% iron and 10% nickel, but can have a ratio of up to 95% iron and 5% nickel. This makes iron the dominant element in any sample of kamacite. It is grouped with the native elements in both Dana and Nickel-Strunz classification systems.

=== Conditions of formation ===
Kamacite starts to form around 723 °C, where iron splits from being face centered to body centered while nickel remains face centered. To accommodate this, areas start to form of higher iron concentration, displacing nickel to the areas around it, which creates taenite, the nickel-end member.

=== Trace elements ===
There has been a great deal of research into kamacite's trace elements. The most notable trace elements in kamacite are gallium, germanium, cobalt, copper, and chromium. Cobalt is the most notable of these where the nickel content varies from 5.26% to 6.81% and the cobalt content can be from 0.25% to 0.77%. All of these trace elements are metallic and their appearance near the kamacite taenite border can give important clues to the environment the meteorite was formed in. Mass spectrometry has revealed kamacite to contain considerable amounts of platinum to be an average of 16.31 (μg/g), iridium to be an average of 5.40 (μg/g), osmium to be an average of 3.89 (μg/g), tungsten to be an average of 1.97 (μg/g), gold to be an average of 0.75 (μg/g), and rhenium to be an average of 0.22 (μg/g). The considerable amounts of cobalt and platinum are the most notable.

=== Important minor elements, substitutions, solid solutions ===
Kamacite sulfurization has been done experimentally in laboratory conditions. Sulfurization resulted in three distinct phases: a mono-sulfide solid solution (Fe_{x}(Ni,Co)_{1-x}S), a pentlandite phase (Fe_{x}(Ni,Co)_{9-x}S_{8}), as well as a P-rich phase. This was done in a lab to construct conditions concurrent with that of the solar nebula. With this information it would be possible to extract information about the thermodynamic, kinetic, and physical conditions of the early solar system. This still remains speculatory as many of the sulfides in meteorites are unstable and have been destroyed. Kamacite also alters to tochilinite (Fe^{2+}· 5-6 (Mg, Fe^{2+})_{5}S_{6}(OH)_{10}). This is useful for giving clues as to how much the meteorite as a whole has been altered. Kamacite to tochilinite alteration can be seen in petrologic microscopes, scanning electron microscope, and electron microprobe analysis. This can be used to allow researchers to easily index the amount of alteration that has taken place in the sample. This index can be later referenced when analyzing other areas of the meteorite where alteration is not as clear.

=== Relationship with taenite ===
Taenite is the nickel rich end member of the kamacite–taenite solid solution. Taenite is naturally occurring on Earth whereas kamacite is only found on Earth when it comes from space. Kamacite forms taenite as it forms and expels nickel to the surrounding area, this area forms taenite. Due to the face centered nature of the kamacite lattice and the body centered nature of the nickel lattice the two make intricate angles when they come in contact with each other. These angles reveal themselves macroscopically in the Thomson structure. Also due to this relationship we get the terms ataxite, hexahedrites and octahedrite. Ataxite refers to meteorites that do not show a grossly hexahedral or octahedral structure. Meteorites composed of 6 wt% or less nickel are often referred to as hexahedrites due to the crystal structure of kamacite being isometric and causing the meteorite to be cubic. Likewise if the meteorite is dominated by the face centered taenite it is called an octahedrite as kamacite will exsolve from the octahedral crystal boundaries of taenite making the meteorite appear octahedral. Both hexahedrites and octahedrite only appear when the meteorite breaks along crystal planes or when prepared to accentuate the Thomson structures; therefore many are mistakenly called ataxites at first.

=== Stability range ===
Kamacite is only stable at temperatures below 723 °C or 600 °C (Stacey and Banerjee, 2012), as that is where iron becomes cool enough to arrange in a body centered crystal structure. Kamacite is also only stable at low pressures as can be assumed because it only forms in space.

=== Effect of shock ===
Metallographic and X-ray diffraction can be used on kamacite to determine the shock history of a meteorite. Using hardness to determine shock histories has been experimented with but was found to be too unreliable. Vickers hardness test was applied to a number of kamacite samples and shocked meteorites were found to have values of 160–170 kg/mm and non-shocked meteorites can have values as high as 244 kg/mm. Shock causes a unique iron transformation structure that is able to be measured using metallographic and X-ray diffraction techniques. After using metallographic and X-ray diffraction techniques to determine shock history it was found that 49% of meteorites found on Earth contain evidence of shock.

== Geologic occurrences ==
Kamacite meteorites have been found on every continent on Earth and have also been found on Mars.

=== Meteorites ===
Kamacite is primarily associated with meteorites because it needs high temperatures, low pressures and few other more reactive elements like oxygen. Chondrite meteorites can be split into groups based on the chondrules present. There are three major types: enstatite chondrites, carbonaceous chondrites and ordinary chondrites. Ordinary chondrites are the most abundant type of meteorite found on Earth making up 85% of all meteorites recorded. Ordinary chondrites are thought to have all originated from three different sources thus they come in three types LL, L, and H; LL stands for Low iron, Low metal, L stands for Low iron abundance, and H is High iron content. All ordinary chondrites contain kamacite in decreasing abundance as you move from H to LL chondrites. Kamacite is also found in many of the less common meteorites mesosiderites and E chondrites. E chondrites are chondrites which are made primarily of enstatite and only account for 2% of meteorites that fall onto the Earth. E chondrites have an entirely different source rock than that of the ordinary chondrites. In analysis of kamacite in E chondrites it was found that they contain generally less nickel than average.

=== Abundance ===
Since kamacite is only formed in space and is only found on Earth in meteorites, it has very low abundance on Earth. Its abundance outside the Solar System is difficult to determine. Iron, the main component of kamacite, is the sixth most abundant element in the universe and the most abundant of those elements generally considered metallic.

== Specific examples ==
=== Meteor crater Arizona ===
Kamacite has been found and studied in Meteor Crater, Arizona. Meteor Crater was the first confirmed meteor impact site on the planet, and was not universally recognized as such until the 1950s. In the 1960s United States Geological Survey discovered kamacite in specimens gathered from around the site tying the mineral to meteorites.

=== Planets ===
Kamacite primarily forms on meteorites but has been found on extraterrestrial bodies such as Mars. This was discovered by The Mars Exploration Rover (MER) Opportunity. The kamacite did not originate on Mars but was put there by a meteorite. This was particularly of interest because the meteorite fell under the lesser known class of mesosiderites. Mesosiderites are very rare on Earth and its occurrence on Mars gives clues to the origin of its larger source rock.

== Uses ==
=== Museums, university and photo specimen preparation ===
Due to the rareness and the generally dull appearance of kamacite it is not popular among private collectors. However many museums and universities have samples of kamacite in their collection. Normally kamacite samples are prepared using polish and acid to show off the Thomson structures. Preparing specimens involves washing them in a solvent, such as Thomson did with nitric acid to bring out the Thomson structures. Then they are heavily polished so they look shiny. Generally the kamacite can be told apart from taenite easily as after this process the kamacite looks slightly darker than the taenite.

=== Looking to the future ===
Kamacite and taenite both have the potential to be economically valuable. An option that would make asteroid mining more profitable would be to gather the trace elements. One difficulty would be refining elements such as platinum and gold. Platinum is worth around 12,000 US$/kg and (kamacite contains 16.11 μg/g platinum) and gold is worth around 12,000 US$/kg (kamacite contains 0.52 μg/g gold); however the likeliness of a profitable return is fairly slim. Asteroid mining for space uses could be more practical, as transporting materials from Earth is costly. Similar to current plans of reusing the modules of the International Space Station in other missions, an iron meteorite could be used to build space craft in space. NASA has put forward preliminary plans to build a space ship in space.

== See also ==
- Glossary of meteoritics
