= Elbogen (meteorite) =

Meteorite

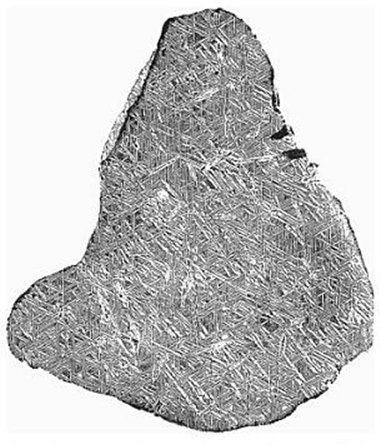
- 1908 macrograph of the Elbogen meteorite, by Alois von Widmanstätten. The nitric acid etched surface was inked and used as a printing plate to outline the structure in relief.
- Type: fer natif
- Class: Medium Octahedrites
- Group: IID
- Country: Present Czech Republic
- Region: Karlovy Vary
- Coordinates: 50°11′N 12°45′E
- Observed fall: Yes
- Fall date: 1400
- TKW: about 107 kg
- Related media on Wikimedia Commons

Elbogen (German: Elbogen), also the Loket Iron (Czech pronunciation: [ˈlokɛt]), is an iron meteorite that fell in the town of Loket, Karlovy Vary Region, Kingdom of Bohemia, about the year 1400. Also known during the Middle Ages as the "bewitched burgrave" of Elbogen in connection to the story of a cursed count from Elbogen Castle, it is the oldest of 15 recorded falls in the Czech Republic. It has not survived to our time in its original size, having been cut for scientific purposes and its pieces sent to museums all around the world.

== Composition ==
=== Structure ===
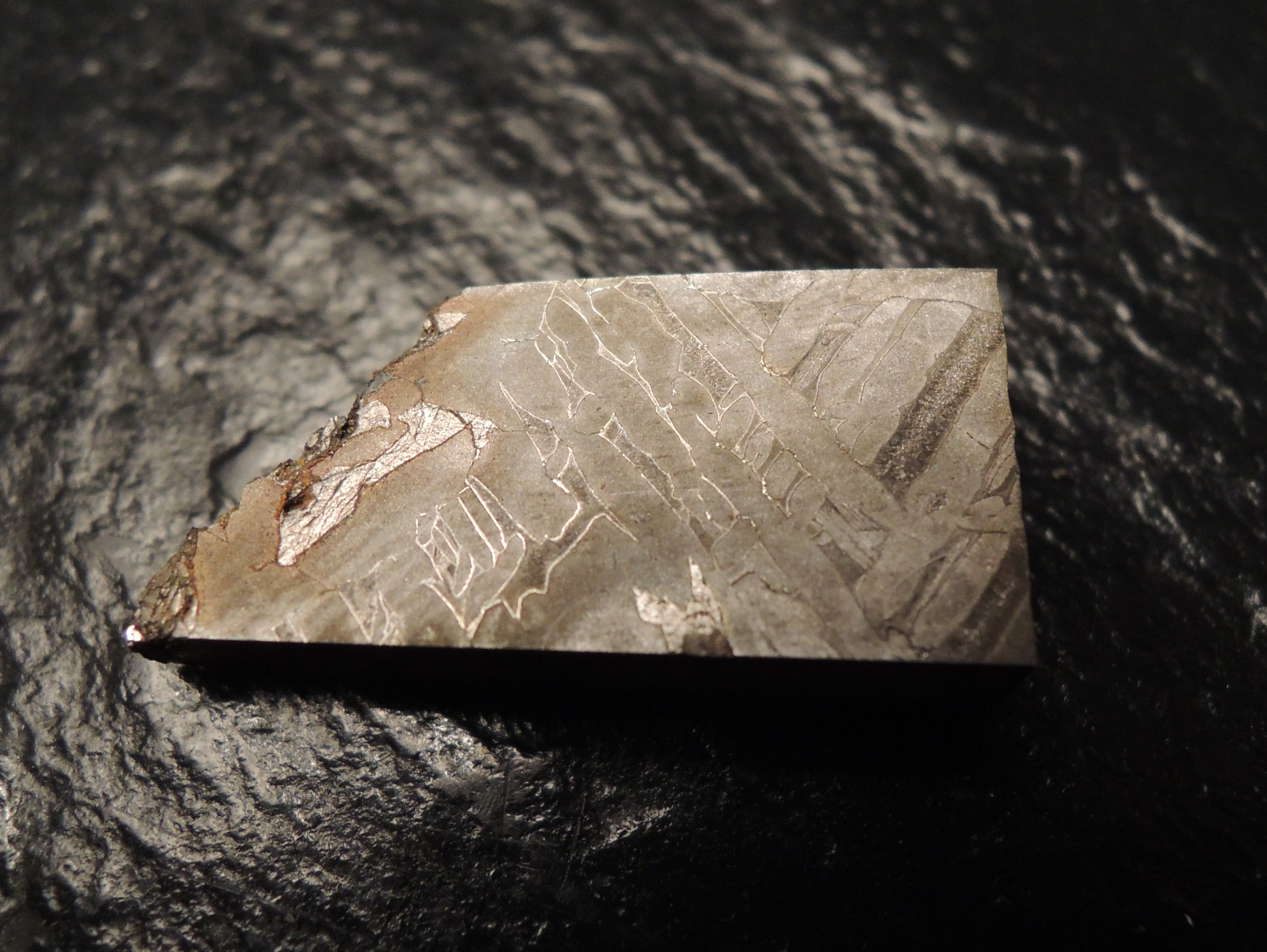
Etched slice of the Elbogen, weighing 8.9 g. This historic IID med octahedrite iron, which dates back to 1400 AD, was preserved for years in a well of the Elbogen Castle, Kingdom of Bohemia.

Weighing about 107 kilograms (236 lb) before being cut into pieces, the Elbogen meteorite has an octahedrite structure. Its dimensions were approximately 50×30×20 centimetres (19.7×11.8×7.9 in) and the mass was rounded and wedge-shaped. The whole surface is covered with dark gray oxides of iron, dull and without the signs of the original fusion crust. The iron must have been partially, if not completely, artificially heated or forged in an iron mill. The cut, etched surface of the meteorite shows a Widmanstätten pattern with tiny round troilite modules. The main mass of the meteorite is formed by nickel-iron alloys.

=== Analysis ===
The Elbogen meteorite is not only one of the oldest recorded falls in history, but also the very iron that Alois von Widmanstätten used to discover the hidden internal structure of iron meteorites in 1808. Instead of etching the iron to reveal these structures, analytic model previously discovered by G. Thomson in 1804, he heated a slab of the iron in the flame of a Bunsen burner and so had the figures that would be later named after him revealed.

In 1811, Mr. K. A. Neumann, a professor of chemistry at the technical institute in Prague had a small piece sent to him for chemical analysis and recognized it as being a piece of a meteorite. This was later confirmed by the German chemist von Klaproth and the physicist Dr. Chladni. Later, the mass was divided into two uneven parts, of which the larger, weighing about 79 kilograms (174 lb) was taken to the royal and imperial natural history museum in Vienna. The smaller piece, weighing about 14 kilograms (31 lb) is still at the town hall in Loket.

Elbogen is classified as a member of the IID chemical group of iron meteorites, a relatively uncommon group with <20 known members (see iron meteorites for more information). The chemical composition of the Elbogen meteorite is of 10.2% Ni, 74.5 ppm Ga, 87 ppm Ge, 14 ppm Ir.

== Superstition ==
Over the years many legends about the Elbogen meteorite have arisen. Some of them date back to the years 1350–1430, when Loket Castle used to be the seat of the burgrave. It is said that one of them, perhaps Puta von Illburk, was cursed by an old woman, struck by lightning and transformed into this hard piece of iron. According to another legend, this same margrave of Elbogen used to oppress and ill-treat his subjects with so much cruelty that after his death he was turned into an iron block, which could not even have been melted in the very hot blaze of a furnace.

In those days, superstition also had that the Elbogen meteorite was fixed with chains in the dungeon of the Loket Castle for fear that it would change weight over time, and even if thrown into the deep castle well that it would always reappear. During the Thirty Years' War the royal and imperial general Johann von Werth decided to try this out by having it thrown into the castle well. However, by the end of 1670 the water in the well was drawn off and the stone was pulled out and brought into the castle. In 1742, the French threw the rock back into the well and it stayed there until sometime in 1776 when it was once more recovered.

Contrary to this story, historical resources explain the origin of the stone as being a meteorite of the size of a horse head.

== Distribution ==
The meteorite was cut for scientific purposes in the 19th century and many of the pieces were sent to museums all over the world. The biggest piece of the meteorite is deposited in the Naturhistorisches Museum in Vienna, weighing roughly 80 kilograms (180 lb).

- American Museum of Natural History, New York City – 46 grams (1.6 oz)
- Charles University, Prague – 6 kilograms (13 lb)
- Field Museum of Natural History, Chicago – 60 grams (2.1 oz)
- Geological Survey of Canada, Ottawa – 8 grams (0.28 oz)
- Harvard University, Harvard – 169 grams (6.0 oz)
- Max Planck Institute, Mainz – 1 gram (0.035 oz)
- Museum für Naturkunde, Berlin – 225 grams (7.9 oz)
- National Museum of Natural History – Washington, D.C. – 70 grams (2.5 oz)
- National Museum, Prague – 6.7 kilograms (15 lb)
- Naturhistorisches Museum, Vienna – 79 kilograms (174 lb)
- Russian Academy of Sciences, Moscow – 4.98 grams (0.176 oz)
- Town Hall, Loket – 14 kilograms (31 lb)
- Universalmuseum Joanneum, Graz – 69 grams (2.4 oz) and 54 grams (1.9 oz)
- University of Tübingen, Tübingen – 146 grams (5.1 oz)
- Vatican Colla, Rome – 32 grams (1.1 oz)

== See also ==
- Glossary of meteoritics
- Count Alois von Beckh Widmanstätten
- Louis Cordier
- Henry Clifton Sorby
