= Hraschina =

Hraschina may refer to:

- Hrašćina, a municipality in the Krapina-Zagorje County in Croatia.
- Hraschina meteorite, official name of a meteorite fallen in 1751 in Croatia near Hrašćina.
