= Hraschina meteorite =

Meteorite that fell in 1751

Hraschina
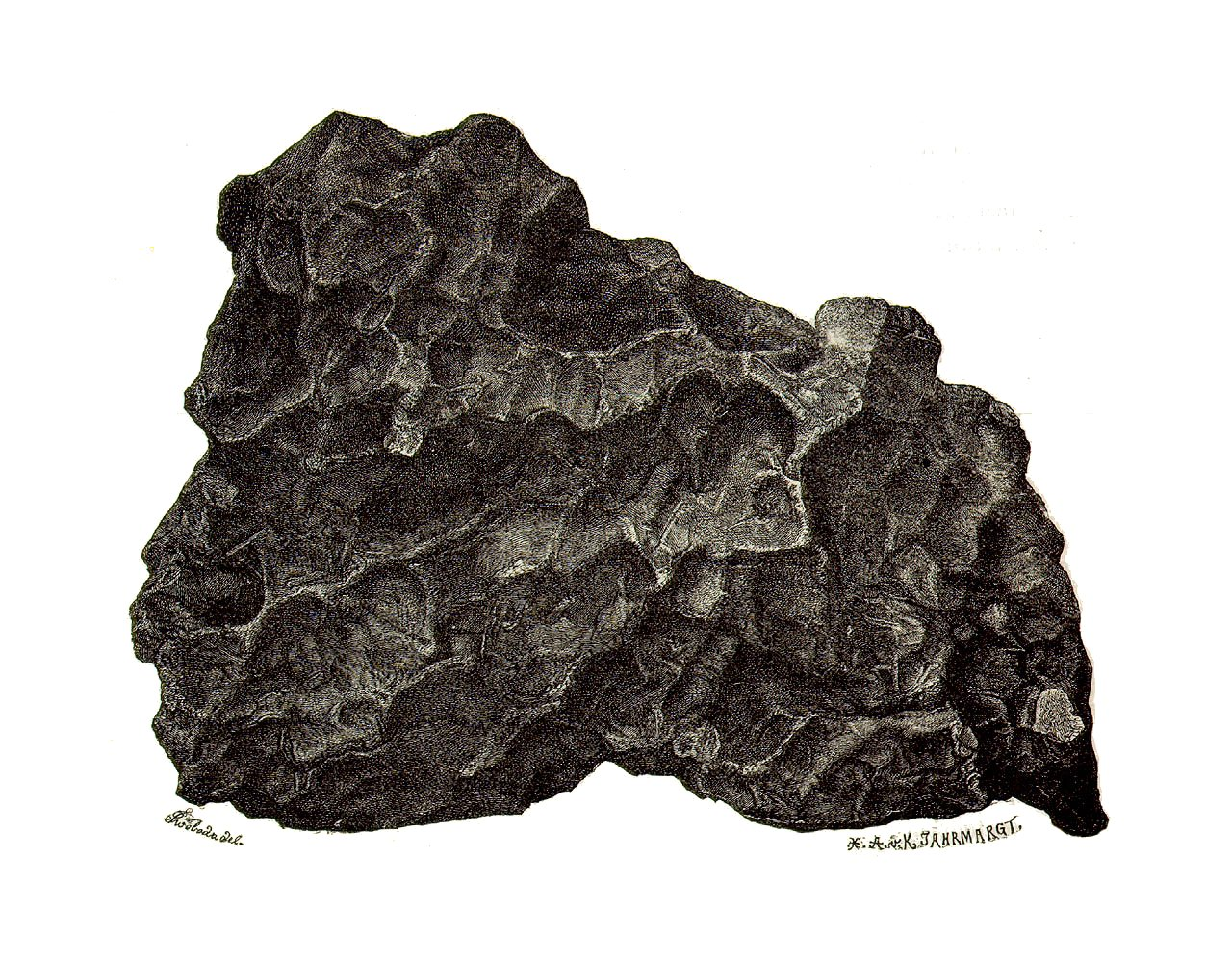
- Drawing of the main mass
- Type: Iron
- Structural classification: Medium octahedrite
- Class: IID
- Composition: Fe 89%, Ni 10.5%, Ge 89.4 ppm, Ga 74.5 ppm
- Country: Croatia
- Region: Hrvatsko Zagorje
- Coordinates: 46°06′N 16°20′E
- Observed fall: Yes
- Fall date: 26 May 1751
- TKW: about 49 kg
- Alternative names: Agram, Hrascina, Hrasina, Zagrab, Zagreb, Zagrebačko željezo
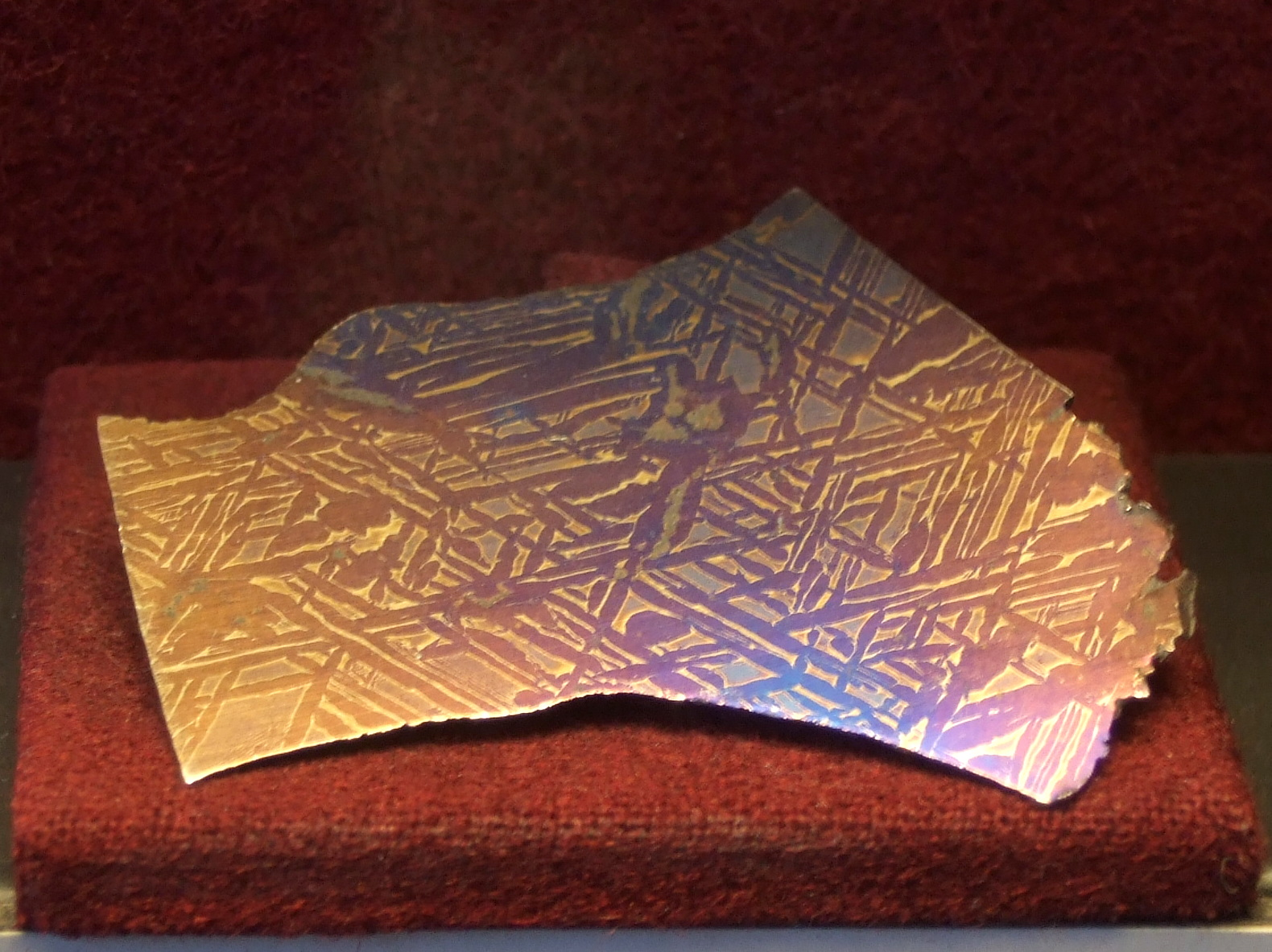
- Etched slice with Widmanstätten patterns, Naturhistorisches Museum Wien
- Related media on Wikimedia Commons

Hraschina is the official name of an iron meteorite that fell in 1751 near the village of Hrašćina in Hrvatsko Zagorje, Croatia. This meteorite is important because it was the first fall of an iron meteorite viewed and reported by a significant number of witnesses, despite its low remaining total known weight. The Hraschina meteorite also proved that rocks really can "fall from the skies".

== History ==
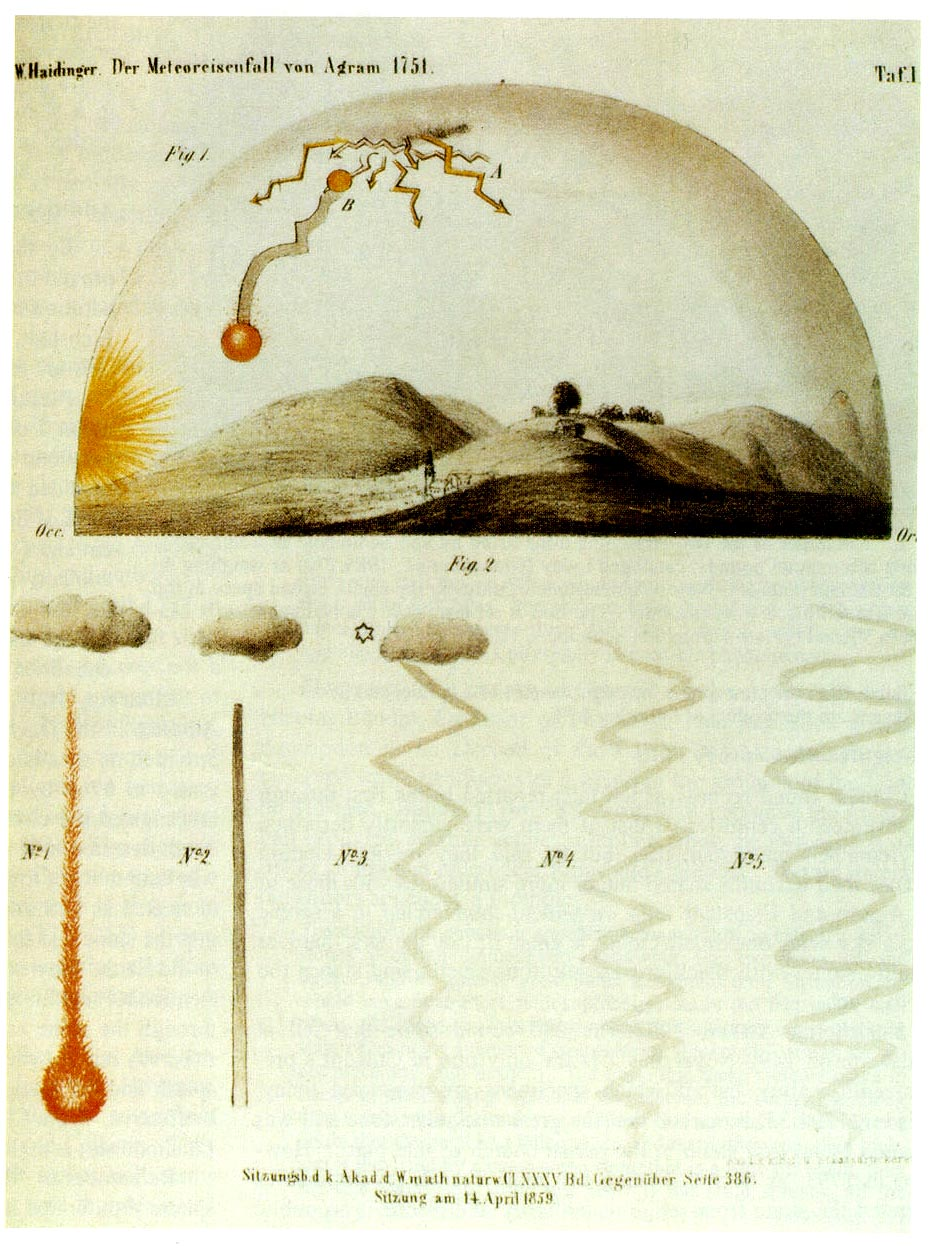
Drawing by M. W. Haidinger depicts the fall of the meteorite based on eyewitness accounts.

On 26 May 1751, at 18:00, a fireball was seen over Hrašćina and sounds like detonations were heard as far away as Varaždin, giving an estimate of nearly 1,000 square miles (2,600 km^{2}) of area over which the meteorite's sound was audible. Many people taking their Sunday evening walk witnessed the event. Baltazar Adam Krčelić, a clergyman, historian, and a noted chronicler of daily events, who was spending time in the village of Biškupec, recorded the following:

"In Biškupec near Varaždin [...] an unusual phenomenon like a small cloud was seen — although it was not a cloud — which became paler and paler, produced an explosive sound and then dispersed. In their ignorance, the common folk thought that the heavens had opened.

Iron masses of 39.8 kilograms (88 lb) and 9 kilograms (20 lb) fell to the east of Hrašćina and were later recovered. The larger mass penetrated 1.40 metres (4 ft 7 in) into the ground. But there are reports that it went much deeper. The smaller mass was split at the place of the fall and partly used by the local villagers for making nails, while the rest of it was split further in Bratislava and subsequently lost.

The Zagreb Catholic chapter sent the meteorites and an official report (the "Protocol of Bishop Klobuczezky and Curate-General Wolfgang Kukuljevic") to the Empress Maria Theresa. The meteorites were deposited in the Treasury in Vienna and then to the Court museum, now the Naturhistorisches Museum Wien (Museum of Natural History in Vienna).

On the basis of the Protocol of Bishop Baron Klobuczezky and the fact that these fresh fallen meteorites presented a molten metal crust, in 1794 Ernst Chladni proposed that meteorites have their origins in outer space. Since meteorites were thought to be of volcanic origin, this was a very controversial statement at the time, but in 1803 was confirmed by Jean Baptiste Biot and was then accepted.

In 1808 Count Alois von Beckh Widmanstätten discovered the Widmanstätten patterns by heating a slab of this meteorite. "Though another scientist, G. Thomson, had also discovered the texture, Widmanstätten's work was recognized by Carl von Schreibers (then Director of the Vienna Natural History Cabinet) and the term Widmanstätten has been used to describe the texture ever since."

== Composition and classification ==
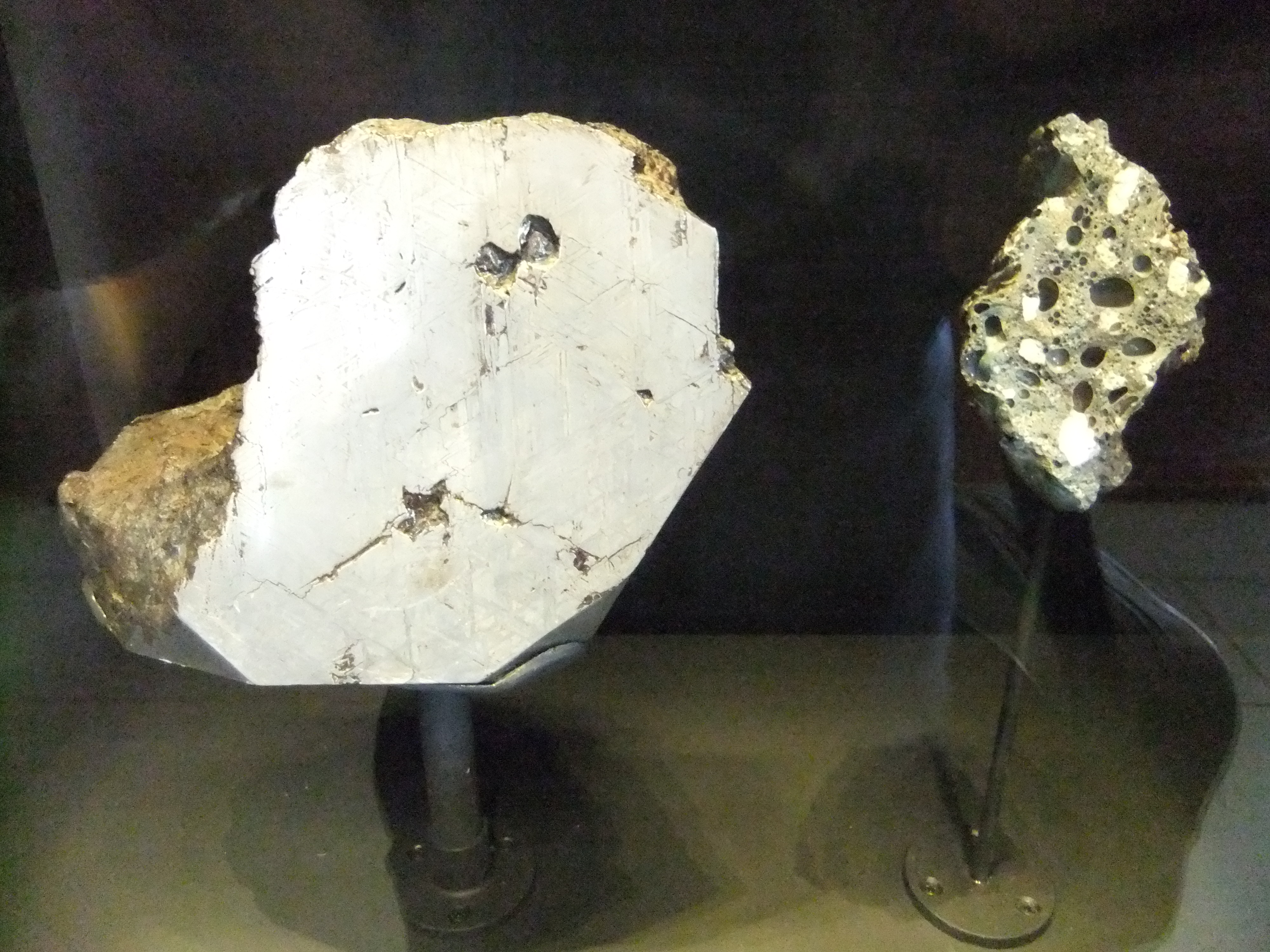
Sample at the Natural History Museum of London, 9.8 grams (0.35 oz)

Hraschina is an iron meteorite chemical type IID, structural class medium octahedrite.

Composition: Fe 89%, Ni 10.5%, Ge 89.4 ppm, Ga 74.5 ppm, Ir 13 ppm.

== Samples distribution ==
The main mass (39 kilograms (86 lb)) is conserved at the Naturhistorisches Museum Wien. The second largest mass is a piece of 44 grams (1.6 oz) recently discovered within an old collection. Other pieces are: 20 grams (0.71 oz) at MiN of Berlin, 9.8 grams (0.35 oz) at the Natural History Museum of London, and a few smaller pieces in other institutions. The largest mass shows evidence of a spirited attack with a hammer-like object.

== See also ==
- Glossary of meteoritics
