= 1788 Kiess =

Carbonaceous main-belt asteroid

Discovery
- Discovered by: Indiana University (Indiana Asteroid Program)
- Discovery site: Goethe Link Obs.
- Discovery date: 25 July 1952

Designations
- Named after: Carl C. Kiess (astronomer)
- Alternative designations: 1952 OZ · 1935 NE; 1964 WP
- Minor planet category: main-belt · Themis

Orbital characteristics
- Epoch 4 September 2017 (JD 2458000.5)
- Uncertainty parameter 0
- Observation arc: 64.78 yr (23,660 days)
- Aphelion: 3.5961 AU
- Perihelion: 2.6381 AU
- Semi-major axis: 3.1171 AU
- Eccentricity: 0.1537
- Orbital period (sidereal): 5.50 yr (2,010 days)
- Mean anomaly: 323.37°
- Mean motion: 0° 10^{m} 44.76^{s} / day
- Inclination: 0.6816°
- Longitude of ascending node: 161.91°
- Argument of perihelion: 143.60°

Physical characteristics
- Dimensions: 19.59 km (calculated); 20.993±0.271 km
- Synodic rotation period: 11.0335±0.0071 h 12±2 h
- Geometric albedo: 0.070±0.014; 0.08 (assumed)
- Spectral type: C
- Absolute magnitude (H): 11.801±0.002 (R) · 11.9 · 11.93±0.26

1788 Kiess, provisional designation 1952 OZ, is a carbonaceous Themistian asteroid from the outer region of the asteroid belt, approximately 20 kilometers in diameter. It was discovered on 25 July 1952, by the Indiana Asteroid Program at the U.S. Goethe Link Observatory near Brooklyn, Indiana, United States, and later named after astronomer Carl Kiess.

== Orbit and classification ==
The C-type asteroid is a member of the Themis family, a dynamical family of outer-belt asteroids with nearly coplanar ecliptical orbits. The asteroid orbits the Sun in the outer main-belt at a distance of 2.6–3.6 AU once every 5 years and 6 months (2,010 days). Its orbit has an eccentricity of 0.15 and an inclination of 1° with respect to the ecliptic. Kiess was first identified as 1935 NE at Algiers Observatory in 1935. Its observation arc begins with its official discovery observation.

== Physical characteristics ==
=== Rotation period ===
In 2010, two rotational lightcurves were obtained from photometric observations at the Palomar Transient Factory in California. Lightcurve analysis gave a rotation period of 12 and 11.0335 hours with a brightness variation of 0.25 and 0.30 magnitude, respectively (U=2-/2).

=== Diameter and albedo ===
According to the survey carried out by NASA's Wide-field Infrared Survey Explorer with its subsequent NEOWISE mission, Kiess measures 20.99 kilometers in diameter, and its surface has an albedo of 0.07. The Collaborative Asteroid Lightcurve Link assumes an albedo of 0.08 and calculates a diameter of 19.59 kilometers with an absolute magnitude of 11.9.

== Naming ==
This minor planet was named for American astronomer Carl C. Kiess (1887–1967), a graduate of Indiana University, who made distinguished contributions both in astronomy and spectroscopy at the U.S. National Bureau of Standards where he worked for over 40 years. The official naming citation was published by the Minor Planet Center on 15 June 1973 (M.P.C. 3508). Kiess was also a member of several eclipse expeditions. The lunar crater Kiess was named in his honour.
