= Alois von Beck Widmanstätten =

Austrian printer and mineralogist (1754–1849)

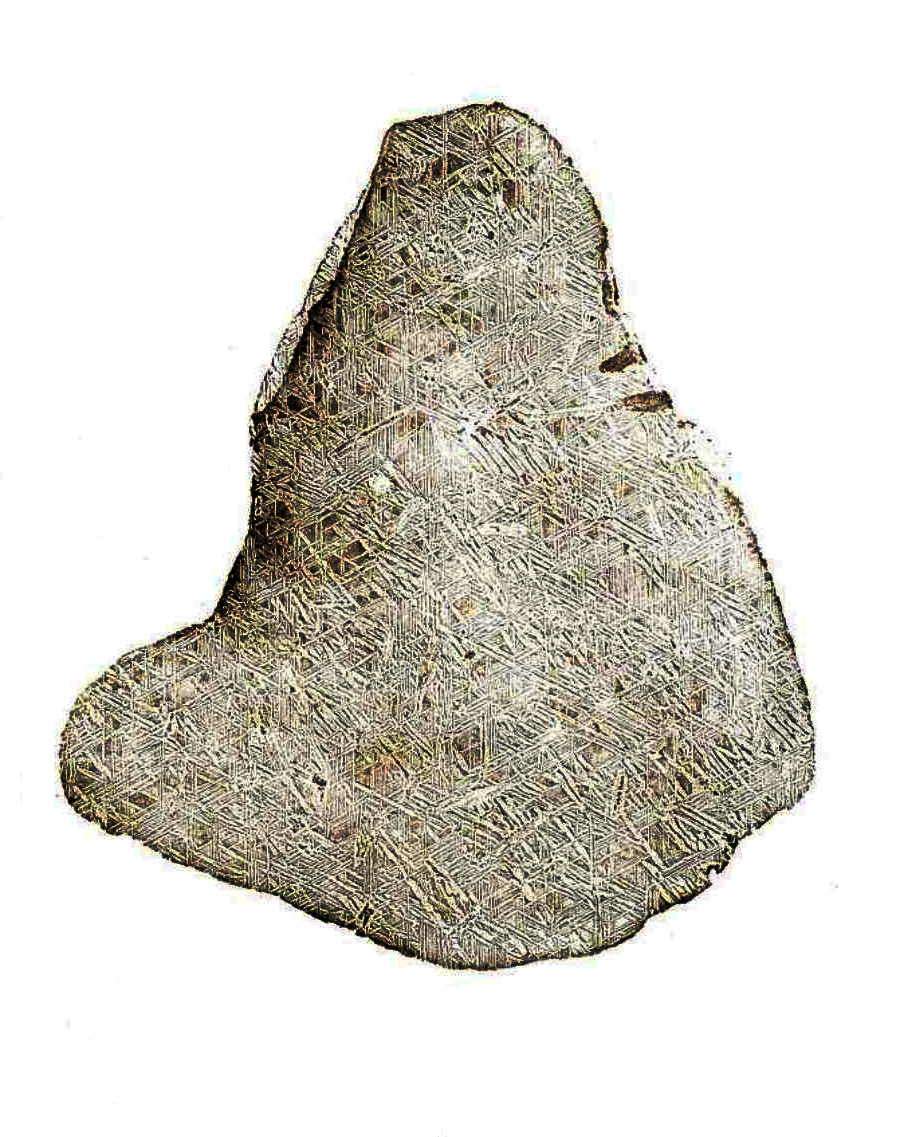
A print of the pattern from Elbogen iron meteorite made by Von Widmannstätten

Count Alois von Beckh Widmanstätten (sometimes given as Alois von Beckh-Widmannstätten or Aloys Joseph Franz Xaver Beck Edler von Widmanstätten: 13 July 1754 – 10 June 1849) was a printer and mineralogist from the Holy Roman Empire and then the Austrian Empire. He is known for recognizing a unique pattern of cross-hatching lines on the surface of iron-rich meteorites, now called Widmanstätten patterns, resulting from the cooling and crystallization of interstitial minerals. A crater on the Moon is named after Widmanstätten.

== Working life ==
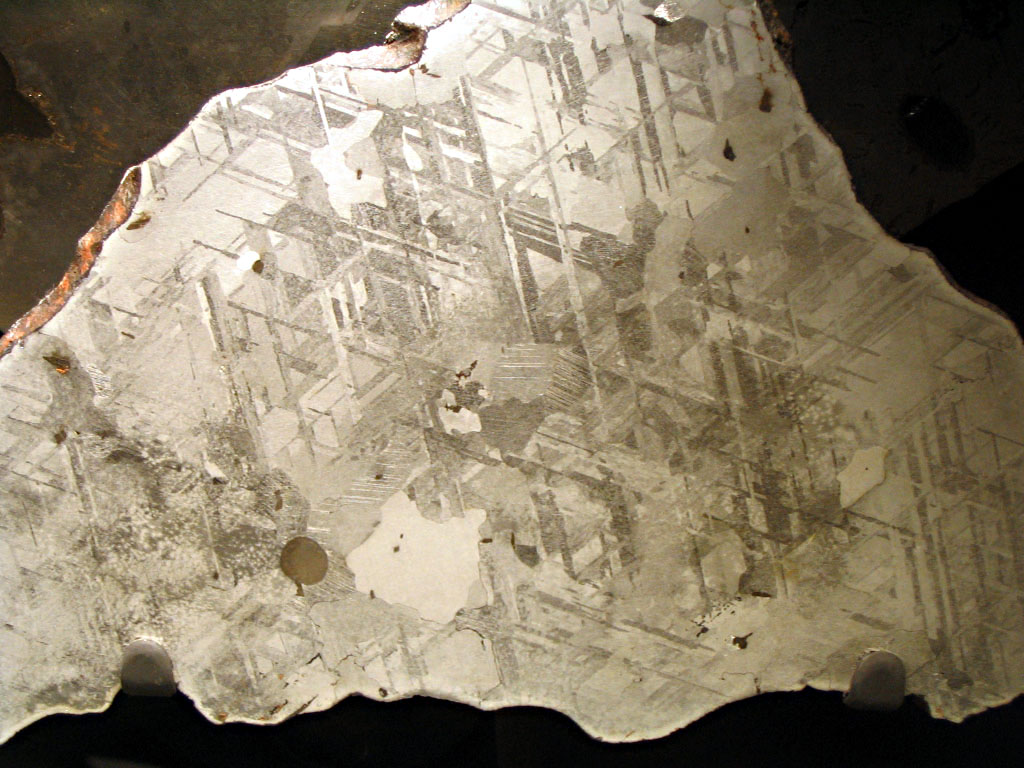
Widmanstätten patterns appear when an iron meteorite is sliced, polished and etched with nitric acid

Von Widmanstätten was born in Graz where his family had a printing business and was trained in the printing art by his father. His family owned exclusive printing rights in the Steiermark province, but this was lost in 1784 and Alois sold the business in 1807. In 1804, he ran a spinning mill in Pottendorf, Austria. In 1806 he was invited by the emperor to head a newly founded Imperial Technical Museum or Fabriksproduktenkabinett begun in 1807. From 1808, he was the director of the Imperial Porcelain works in Vienna.

== Widmanstätten patterns ==
While working at the Fabriksproduktenkabinett, he began to examine iron meteorites along with Karl von Schreibers. They polished and etched the surface of iron meteorites with dilute nitric acid and noticed that it revealed a patterning of cross-hatched lines that came to be called Widmanstätten patterns. In a letter of 22 June 1812, German physicist Ernst Chladni told N.A. Neumann, a professor of chemistry in Prague, that Widmanstätten had observed patterns in the surface of a meteorite that had been etched with nitric acid. He examined by flame-heating a slab of Hraschina meteorite. The different iron alloys of meteorites oxidized at different rates during heating, causing color and luster differences.

In 1813 he made imprints of these structures with printing ink and paper. These were unpublished during his life. A print of the structures from the Hraschina meteorite collected in 1751 was used in a supplement to the book Über Feuer-Meteore, und über die mit denselben herabgefallenen Massen of Ernst Chladni which was published by Schreibers in 1820 as Beiträge zur Geschichte und Kenntniss meteorischer Stein und Metallmassen. Schreibers named the structure after Widmanstätten and the term is widely used in metallurgy.

The Widmanstätten pattern had been observed previously, in 1804, by the English mineralogist William (Guglielmo) Thomson. During the period that he spent in Naples, he discovered these figures by bathing a Krasnojarsk meteorite in nitric acid for the purpose of removing rust and he published his discovery in French in the Bibliothèque Britannique, but Thomson's publication escaped Schreibers' notice.

== Named after him ==
- Widmanstätten patterns of iron meteorites
- The crater Widmannstätten on the Moon
- 21564 Widmanstätten asteroid
