= Kiess (crater) =

Crater on the Moon

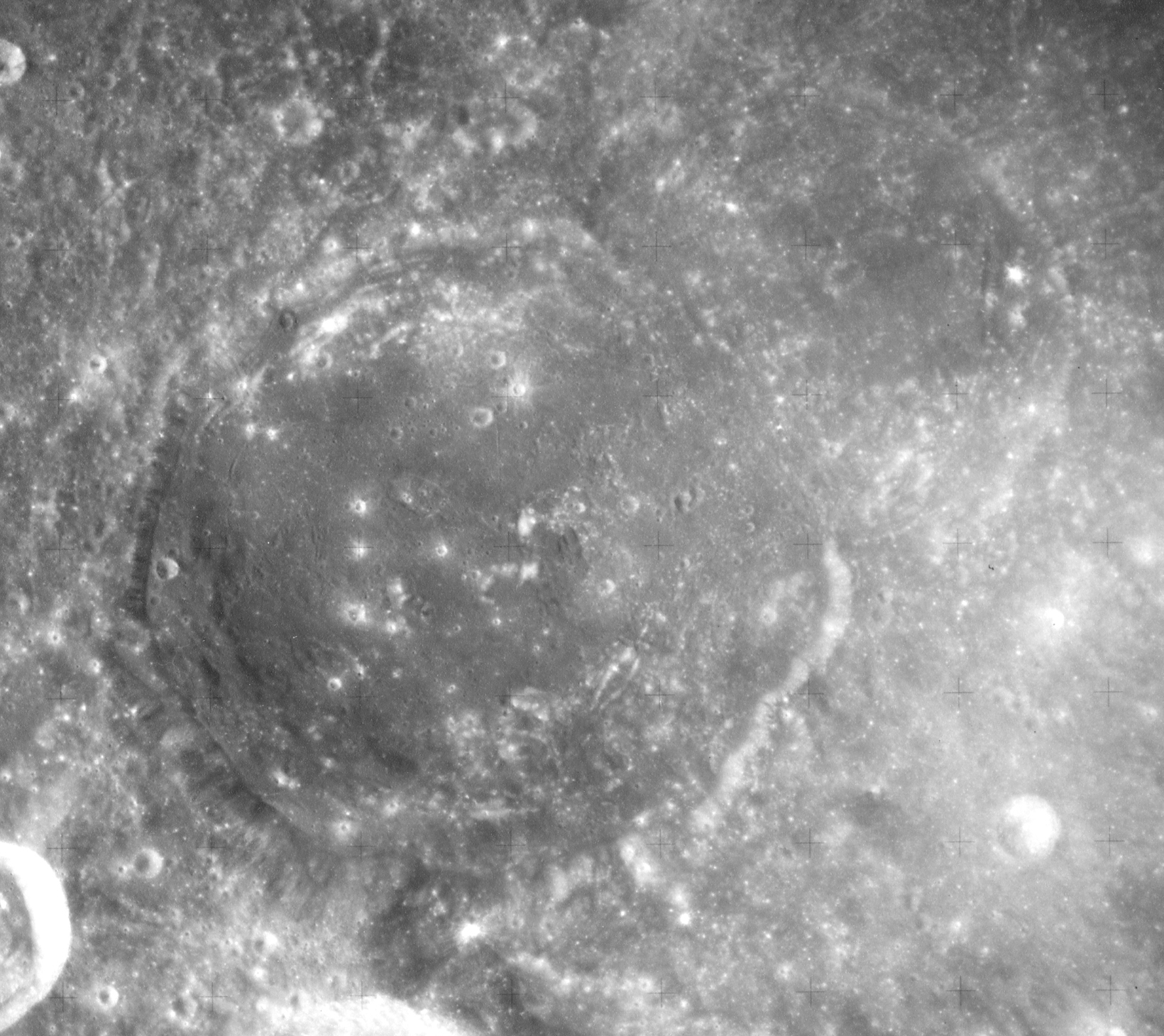
- Lunar craters Kiess (center) and Widmannstätten (upper right) as seen by the mapping camera of Apollo 17
- Coordinates: 6.41°S 84.11°E
- Diameter: 67.79 km
- Depth: 1.1 km
- Colongitude: 277° at sunrise
- Eponym: Carl C. Kiess

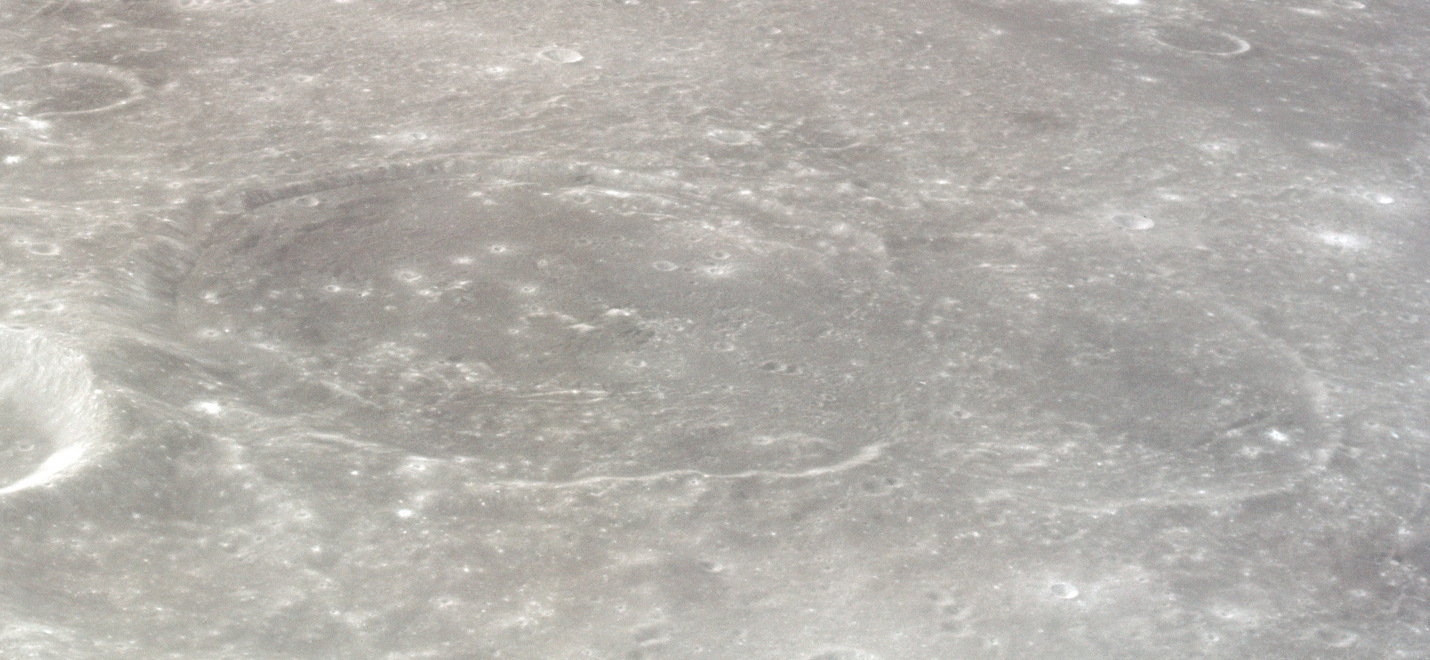
Oblique view of Kiess and Widmannstätten from Apollo 12

Kiess is a lunar impact crater next to the southern border of the Mare Smythii, near the eastern limb of the Moon. It is located to the east of the crater Kästner, and to the north of Dale and Kreiken.

The interior floor of this crater has been flooded by lava, leaving only a narrow rim above the surface. This surface has a low albedo, and is as dark as the neighboring mare. There is a break in the northeastern rim of Kiess where the crater is nearly attached to the somewhat smaller Widmannstätten, another flooded formation. The overall shape of the rim is slightly elongated in longitude, but it is not overlaid by other craters of note. There are a low ridges on the western interior floor that are concentric to the inner wall. Both Kiess and Widmannstätten have fractured floors.

The craters Kiess and Widmannstätten were referred to as Wright Brothers, such as by the crew of Apollo 17, prior to being officially named by the IAU in 1973.

== See also ==
- 1788 Kiess, minor planet
