= Loket Castle =

12th-century Gothic castle

- Loket, Karlovy Vary Region
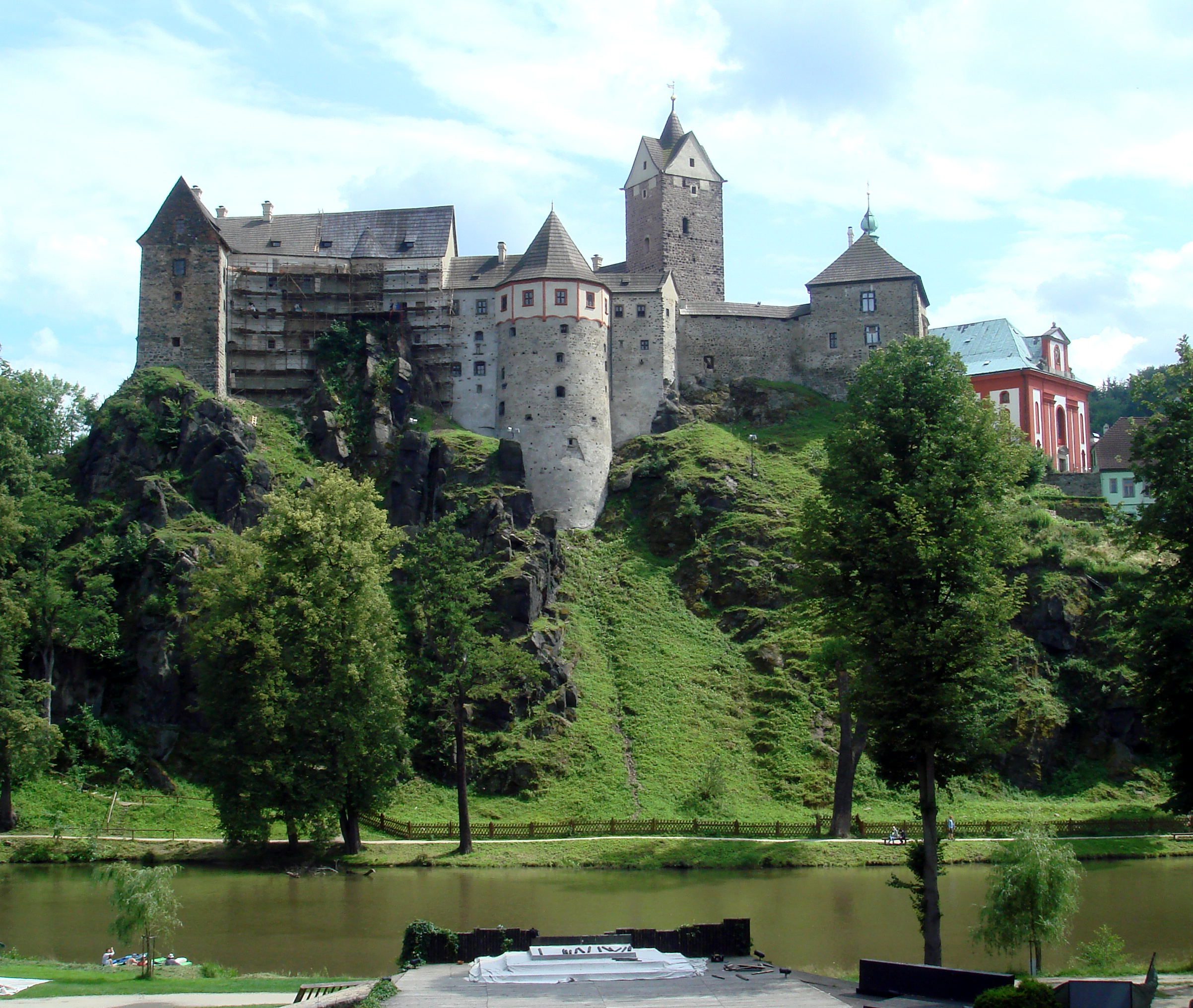
- Loket Castle

Site information
- Type: Castle

Location
- Location in the Czech Republic
- Coordinates: 50°11.19′N 12°45.05′E

Site history
- Built: 1230

Loket Castle (Czech: Hrad Loket, German: Burg Elbogen) is a 12th-century Gothic castle in Loket in the Karlovy Vary Region of the Czech Republic. It ls located on a massive rock, surrounded on three sides by the Ohře river. Once known as "the Impregnable Castle of Bohemia", because of its thick walls, it is one of the oldest stone castles in the country. It is administered by the Loket Castle Foundation since 1993 and preserved today as a museum and national monument. First built in the Romanesque style in the 12th century, the castle was expanded in the Gothic style during the next century, and took most of its current form during reconstruction work in the 1390s.

== History ==
=== Construction in the 12th century ===
Loket was originally called Elbogen, German for elbow (written according to medieval orthography), with the meaning of river bend, which relates to the hairpin bend of the Ohře (German: Eger), and the castle was known as Stein-Elbogen (modern German: Stein zum Ellenbogen), lit. 'rock at the bend'.

Loket/Elbogen is said to have been founded in 870 by the margraves of Vohburg, relatives of the dukes of Bavaria, who held ownership over the Eger and Elbogen districts at the time and preserved it until the extinction of their male line in the 12th century.

According to archaeological investigations, the foundation of the stone castle dates back to the third quarter of the 12th century, during the reign of Přemyslid king Ottokar (Otakar) I (c. 1155–1230), either by the Czech Prince Vladislaus (Vladislav) I (later King Vladislaus II of Bohemia), or by ministeriales of Emperor Frederick I Barbarosa. The old Romanesque castle comprised two towers, a church and a building standing on the site of the present Margrave's House. The church stood beneath the present castle where St. Wenceslaus Church is standing today. The other tower, no longer extant, stood to the north-east of the castle. Above all, the castle served as protection to the merchant's path leading from Prague through Cheb and on to Plauen and Erfurt, but after the re-annexation by the Czech state it began functioning as a frontier fortress. By this time it became the new administrative centre of the region.

=== 13th and 14th centuries ===
By the turn of the 13th century a settlement was built around the castle walls and later raised into a royal town.

The first written mention of Loket as a town comes from a 1234 deed when the first known royal Loket burgrave was recorded.

From the 1250s the castle was gradually enlarged and the formerly Romanesque building turned into a Gothic stronghold which was often visited by the members of the royal family.

Under the rule of the Přemyslid king Ottokar (Otakar) II (r. 1253–1278), a new fortification wall with semicylindrical towers was constructed. Queen Elisabeth of Bohemia (Eliška Přemyslovna; 1292–1330) used to take refuge in the castle with her children during the upheavals against John of Luxembourg as well as to protect herself against his anger. The last time she had to hide there was in the early spring of 1319, when King John conquered the castle with a trick when he persuaded the guard to open the gate pretending a friendly visit to his wife. Queen Eliška was taken prisoner and transported to Mělník, the dowry castle of the Czech queens. Their three-year-old son Prince Václav, later King and Emperor Charles IV (r. 1346–1378), was held here for two months in the underground prison, a period which he later described as a horrible imprisonment in a cellar with one tiny window. As an adult and an important European ruler, Charles IV did not come to hate Loket and often stayed there. In his unimplemented 1350 code Maiestas Carolina, he classified Loket among the places which should have stayed in permanent property of the Czech crown.

The comprehensive restoration of the castle under Wenceslaus IV (b. 1361– d. 1419), which probably took place during the very last years of the 14th century, was decisive for its present form. Of the original Romanesque buildings, those preserved were mainly the extremely rare rotunda, the foundations of the castle tower and those of the northern palace. The margave's house also originated in the reign of Wenceslaus IV.

=== 15th and 16th centuries ===
The Hussite Wars (1419 – c. 1434) did not leave out Loket when the town found itself in the hands of the supporter of the Catholic Church, burgrave Půta of Illburk. The Hussite troops tried twice to capture the castle under the leadership of Krušina of Švamberk and later under the leadership of Jakoubek of Vřesovice, but both sieges ended without success.

The castle continued to be enlarged up to the 1420s and in 1434 it was mortgaged to chancellor Kaspar Schlick by Sigismund of Luxembourg as a reward for his financial aid. Further reconstruction took place in the second half of the 15th century when the castle was turned into a representative ancestral seat under the administration of the House of Schlik, which lasted for more than 100 years. It served this purpose even after the House of Schlik divided itself into several branches – Falknov, Jáchymov and Ostrov. Its architecture followed the spirit of the late Gothic and the new-coming Renaissance. The Schliks changed the southern palace into a great hall, and the eastern palace into the "Schlik Archives". The castle suffered from being converted into a prison in the 19th century.

During the 16th century the House of Schlik became one of the wealthiest families in the country and the most powerful in the region. Their era in the Loket castle was one of disputes with the Loket burghers, which often led to acts of violence and open conflict. Due to their participation in the 1547 revolt of the Czech states against the king, later Emperor Ferdinand I Habsburg, many of the possessions of the House of Schlik were confiscated and eventually they lost the castle. From 1551 to 1562 the castle was administered by the nobility of Plauen, but it was taken from them because of poor administration and conferred to the Loket burghers. In 1598 it became a hereditary legacy to the burghers, serving for administrative purposes only. Every time the town hall faced a disastrous condition the town aldermen held their sessions there.

=== 17th century ===
In 1607 or 1613, the nobleman Jiří Popel of Lobkovic (born c. 1551), a former Imperial Administrator, died of an apoplectic stroke in the Loket Castle jail. He had been accused of treason and imprisoned in Kladsko for many years. Later he was buried on the site of a former church tower.

During the Thirty Years' War (1618-1648), the town was afflicted with numerous disasters. At its beginning, Protestant Loket supported the opposition against the Emperor. After the Battle of the White Mountain, the Loket citizens allowed the Mansfeld detachments to enter the town. In 1621 the town was besieged by the Bavarians led by Tilly and after a huge bombardment the town was forced to surrender and the Saxons had to leave. The town was then punished for disobedience by extensive repressive measures. This situation recurred again in 1631 when the burghers allowed the Saxons to enter and captured the town. Swedish troops operating in the Loket area didn't attack the town, but The Thirty Years' War and the repressive measures by imperial officials brought great economic losses to Loket.

=== From the 18th century up to modern times ===
In 1725 the castle was burned down and only the ground floor and the underground of the castle remained. In the beginning of the 19th century the Margrave's House was then rebuilt and a museum of porcelain established. In 1788 a proposal for the reconstruction of the castle into a town prison was put forward, and the work was finished in 1822. During that time a palace called the Stone Chamber in the vicinity of the tower was pulled down and other buildings were lowered by one storey.

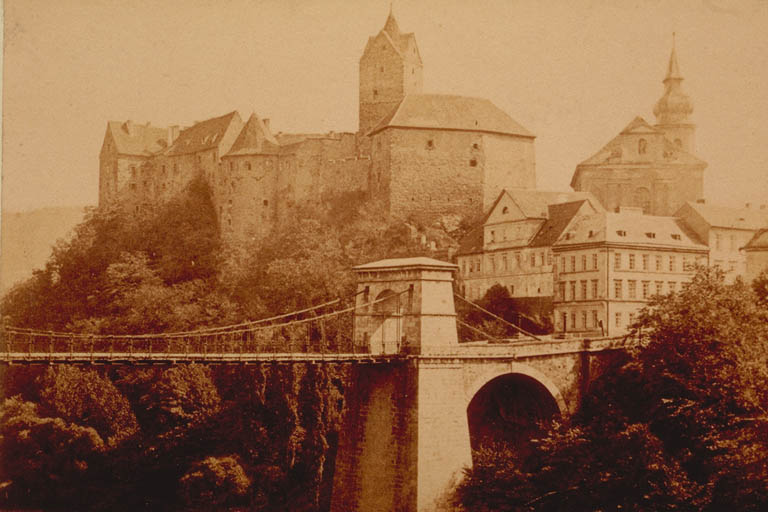
Photo of Loket castle in 1870 by František Fridrich

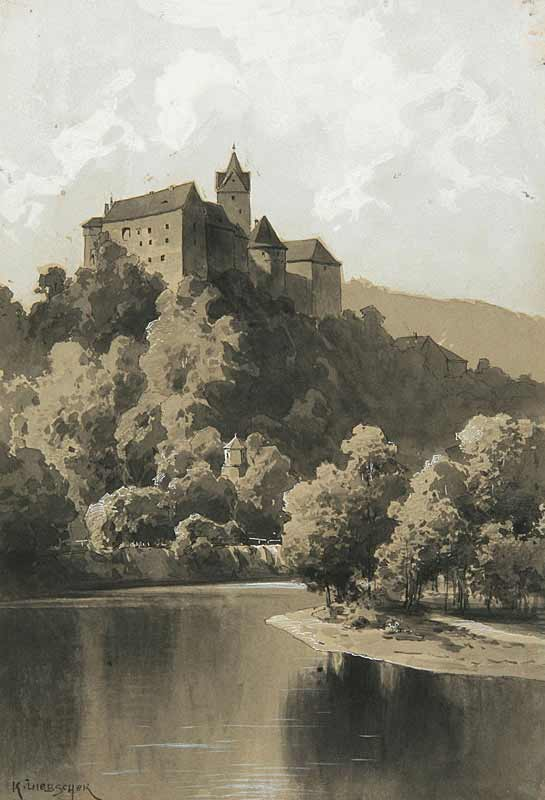
Watercolor of Loket castle by Karel Liebscher – end of the 19th century

The prison was closed down in 1948. From 1968 on, the castle was administered by the Ancient Monuments Departments in Plzeň. The turning point for the improvement and opening up of the castle came in 1992, when it was once again returned to the town of Loket. The town established the Loket Castle Foundation, which was later transformed into a common welfare corporation.

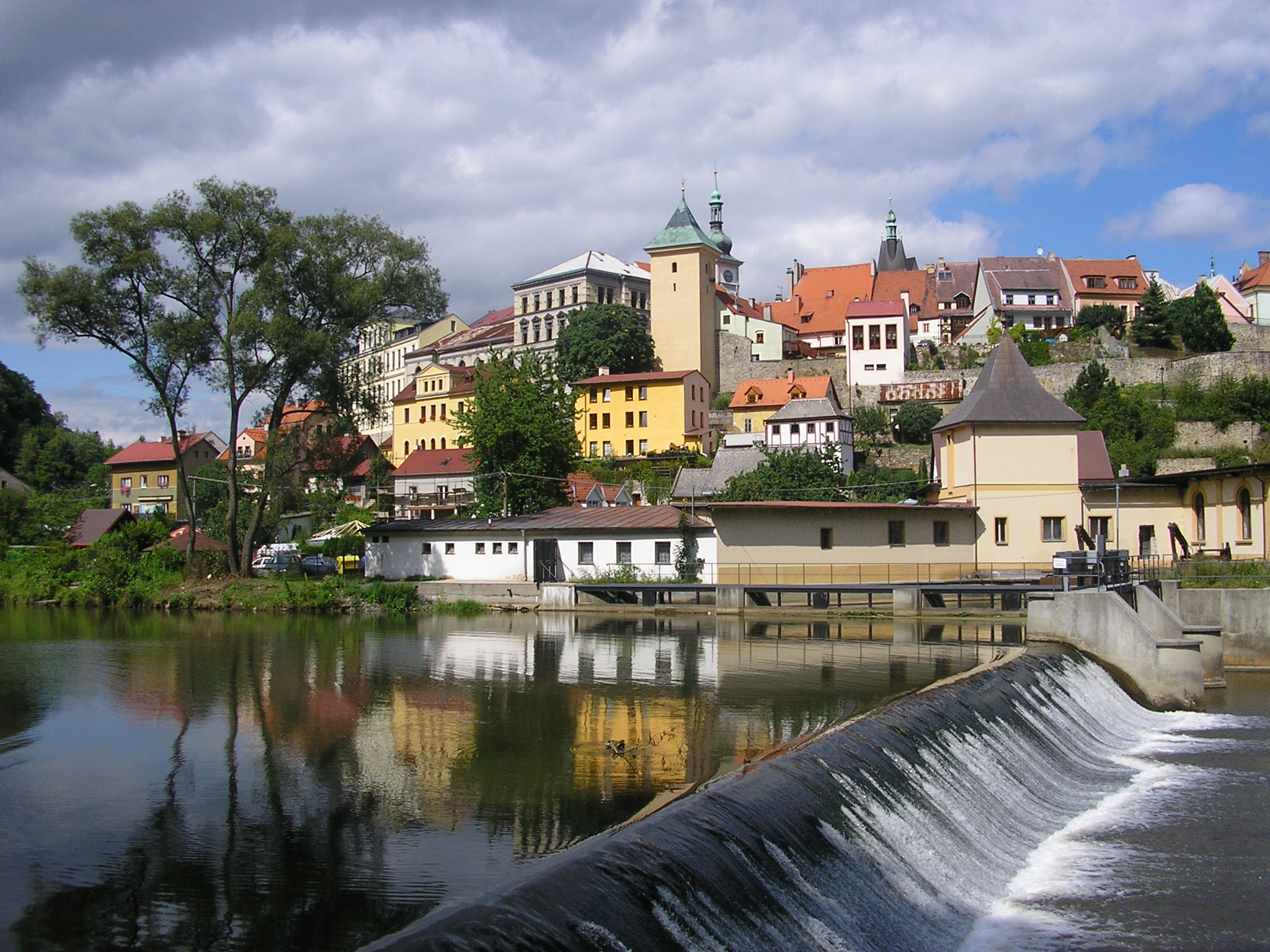
The town of Loket and the Ohře River

== Sections of the castle ==
The castle today is divided into nine different parts containing many medieval artefacts of historical interest. Besides the Margrave's House where an exhibition of porcelain is on display, the castle also features the remains of a Romanesque rotunda, the smallest of its type in the Czech Republic, the prison cells and the torture chamber, the wedding and the ceremonial hall, the historical arms and archaeological hall, where a replica of the Elbogen meteorite (the so-called "bewitched burgrave") is on display, a Romanesque polygonal tower, the 15th-century burgrave's house and the captain's house, and a 16th-century palace with two wings and fortifications incorporating strongholds.

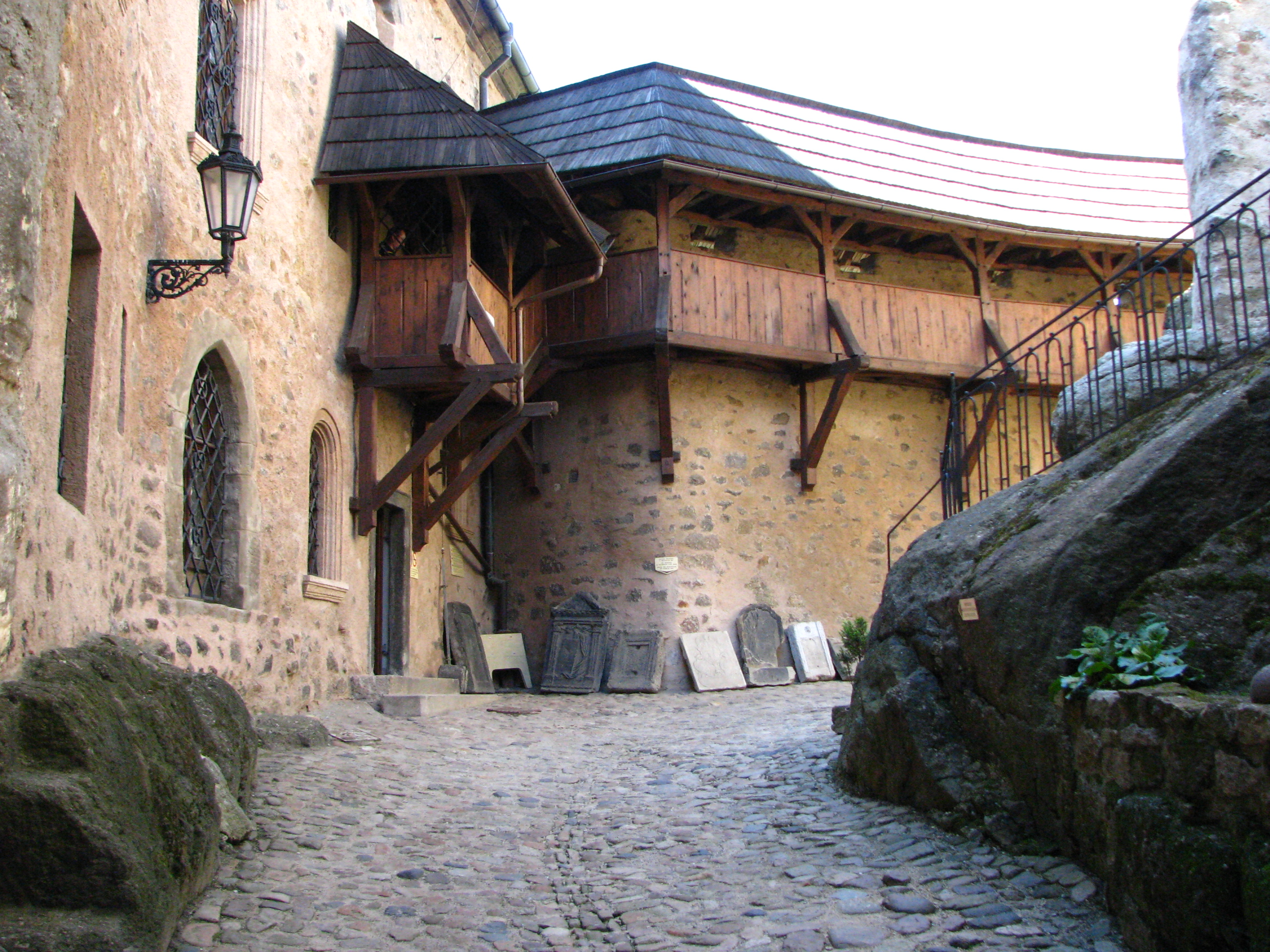
The Margrave's House entrance door and tombstones from the former Loket cemetery

=== Margrave's House ===
Built in Romanesque style, it was set up in its present appearance to serve as the town museum in 1907. After recent reconstructions, the museum of locally made porcelain has been re-opened to the public on the first floor. Later, exhibitions were also held in other rooms in the castle. Several tombstones are placed in a row by the entrance to the building. One of them originates from the Renaissance tomb of a certain Rabbi Benjamin from the now disappeared Jewish cemetery, which was situated in the Robičské suburb, with a laudatory poem dating approximately to 1700, while the others come from the former Loket cemetery at St. John's Church.

=== Archaeological hall ===
During the archaeological research in spring 1993, many fragments as well as other materials from the time of the many reconstruction periods in the Loket castle were found. The masonry of the original Romanesque rampart from before 1230, when the castle was first built, was then uncovered. The walls are 2.2 by 2.5 metres (7.2 by 8.2 ft) thick. They are based directly on the rock and are built entirely of quarry stone. In the upper part of the excavation, below the main window, the walls of the palace from the times of the castle reconstruction during the reign of King Wenceslas and the remains of a Renaissance kitchen dating back to 1528–1536 were also found. In the corner a rectangular foundation for a heating structure is also noticeable next to a worn-out stone threshold.

=== Rotunda ===
The rotunda, originally hidden in the body of a spiral staircase in the northern part of the castle, indicates its Slavic origin. It has an inner diameter of 3.6 metres (12 ft) with a peripheral wall of about 75 to 80 centimetres (30 to 31 in) thick and stood alone until 1966 when it was discovered. It probably originated at the end of the 12th century, because the complete building concept of a Romanesque castle would otherwise have been an exception in the concept of Premyslid castles of the 12th century. It needs to be added that even historians do not agree whether the castle is an example of Staufer or Premyslid architecture.

=== Cathedral ===
The Baroque cathedral was erected on the site of the original Gothic church, which was burned down in 1725. The new church was completed in 1734, to a design by Wolfgang Braubock. The altar paintings are attributed to Petr Brandl, and both the valuable side altars were probably the work of the Loket sculptor Jan Wild. When the church was reconstructed, the old churchyard behind the presbytery was restored. A monument to Lord Václav Popel of Lobkovice, imprisoned in Loket and buried in the church crypt, was erected here.

== In films ==
The town centre and castle were both used as locations in the 2006 film Casino Royale, representing a town in Montenegro.

== Notes ==
- Šmíd, Richard. Historic Town and Castle – Polypress (1999)
- M'Plan, "Panoramic City Maps" – M'Plan sro. (2005)
- Loket "City Map" – SKHZ (2009)
