= Carl Clarence Kiess =

American astronomer (1887–1967)

Carl Clarence Kiess (October 18, 1887 – October 16, 1967) was an American astronomer. His main contributions was in the study of solar and stellar spectra.

Kiess was born in Fort Wayne, Indiana. He earned a BA in astronomy from Indiana University in 1910 and a PhD from the University of California, Berkeley in 1913. After teaching at the University of Missouri, Pomona College, and the University of Michigan, Kiess took a position at the National Bureau of Standards in 1917. He retired from the bureau in 1957.

While working at the Lick Observatory on July 6, 1911, Kiess discovered comet C/1911 N1, which was named after him. A lunar crater and the asteroid 1788 were also named after him.

Kiess was a recipient of an honorary doctorate degree from the Indiana University.
