= Loket =

Town in the Karlovy Vary Region, Czech Republic

- Town
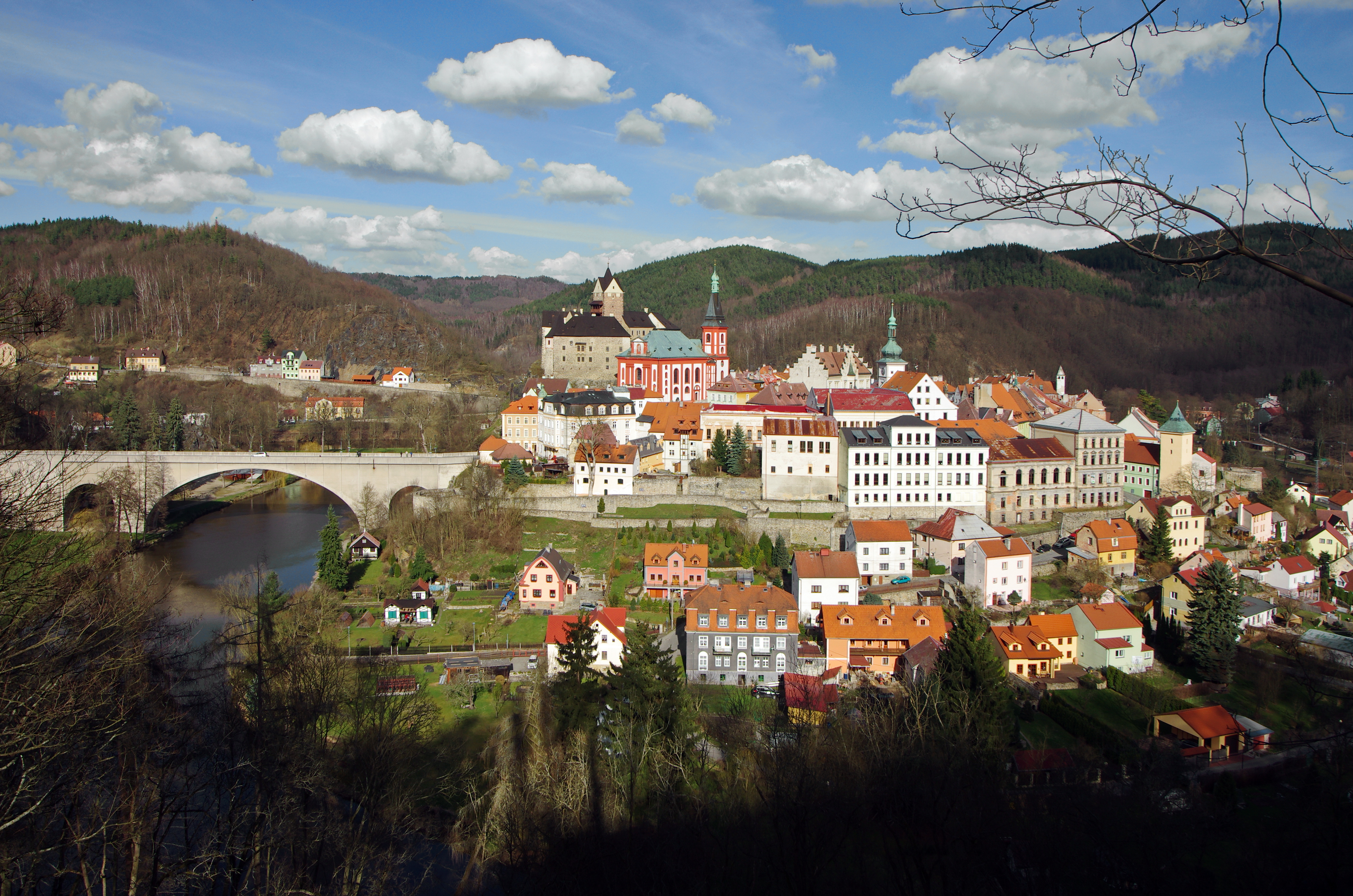
- Skyline of Loket

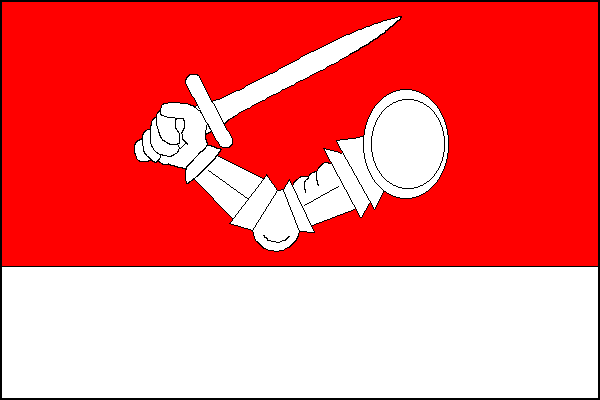
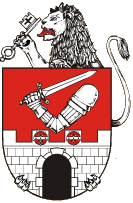
- Flag Coat of arms

- Location in the Czech Republic
- Coordinates: 50°11′10″N 12°45′15″E
- Country: Czech Republic
- Region: Karlovy Vary
- District: Sokolov
- First mentioned: 1234

Government
  - Mayor: Zdeněk Bednář

Area
  - Total: 26.73 km^{2} (10.32 sq mi)
- Elevation: 427 m (1,401 ft)

Population (2026-01-01)
  - Total: 2,990
  - Density: 112/km^{2} (290/sq mi)
- Time zone: UTC+1 (CET)
  - Summer (DST): UTC+2 (CEST)
- Postal code: 357 33
- Website: www.loket.cz

Loket (Czech pronunciation: [ˈlokɛt]; German: Elbogen) is a town in Sokolov District in the Karlovy Vary Region of the Czech Republic. It has about 3,000 inhabitants. The town proper is located on the Ohře River in the Slavkov Forest highland.

Loket was founded in the first third of the 13th century at the latest. The historic town centre is well preserved and is protected as an urban monument reservation. The most important monument is the Loket Castle, a 12th-century Gothic castle.

== Administrative division ==
Loket consists of four municipal parts (in brackets population according to the 2021 census):

- Loket (2,755)
- Dvory (21)
- Nadlesí (68)
- Údolí (92)

== Etymology ==
Both Loket and Elbogen mean 'elbow' in Czech and German, respectively. The town got its name due to the town centre being surrounded on three sides by the Ohře River, and the shape the river takes is similar to that of an elbow.

== Geography ==
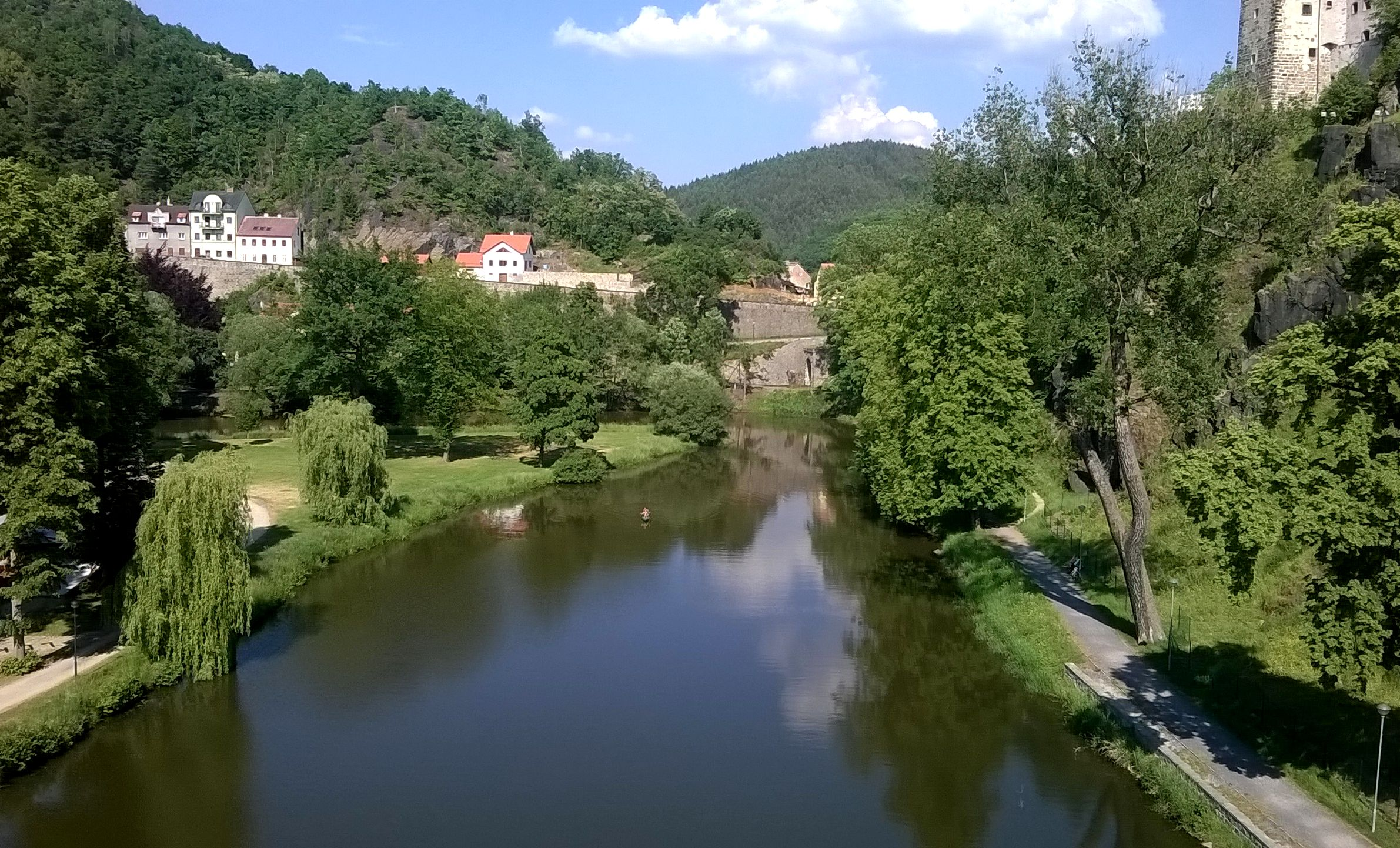
The Ohře River below the castle

Loket is located about 6 kilometres (4 mi) east of Sokolov and 8 km (5 mi) southwest of Karlovy Vary. It lies mostly in the Slavkov Forest highland, only the northwestern part of the town extends into the Sokolov Basin. The highest point is the hill Zelenáč at 707 m (2,320 ft) above sea level. The Ohře River flows through the town.

== History ==
In the second half of the 12th century, a royal castle Loket was built on a landmark promontory within the Ohře River bend. It used to be called the "Key to the Kingdom of Bohemia". Soon after, a small town, first mentioned in 1234, arose below the castle.

Most of the town fortifications were built in the 14th century. In the 17th century it was expanded with Baroque bastions.

In 1815, a porcelain factory was founded in Loket, and the town subsequently became famous for its porcelain production. At the end of the 19th century, two more porcelain factories were built. Job opportunities brought an influx of residents and development of the city. Porcelain production was discontinued in 2006.

From 1938 to 1945, Loket was occupied by Nazi Germany and administered as part of the Reichsgau Sudetenland. In 1945, the German-speaking population was expelled according to the Beneš decrees.

== Demographics ==
Historical population

Year	Pop.	±%
1869	4,179	—
1880	4,120	−1.4%
1890	4,663	+13.2%
1900	5,538	+18.8%
1910	5,104	−7.8%

Year	Pop.	±%
1921	4,716	−7.6%
1930	5,083	+7.8%
1950	2,664	−47.6%
1961	2,595	−2.6%
1970	2,037	−21.5%

Year	Pop.	±%
1980	1,833	−10.0%
1991	2,989	+63.1%
2001	3,202	+7.1%
2011	2,978	−7.0%
2021	2,936	−1.4%

Source: Censuses

== Transport ==
Loket is the starting point of the railway line to Chomutov.

== Culture ==
Loket hosts an annual opera festival, which takes place in an open-air amphitheatre with the castle as a backdrop. The festival, called Loketské kulturní léto ('Loket Cultural Summer'), was established in 2000. The amphitheatre has a capacity of 1,800 seated spectators.

== Sport ==
Loket hosts the annual Czech Motocross Grand Prix.

== Sights ==
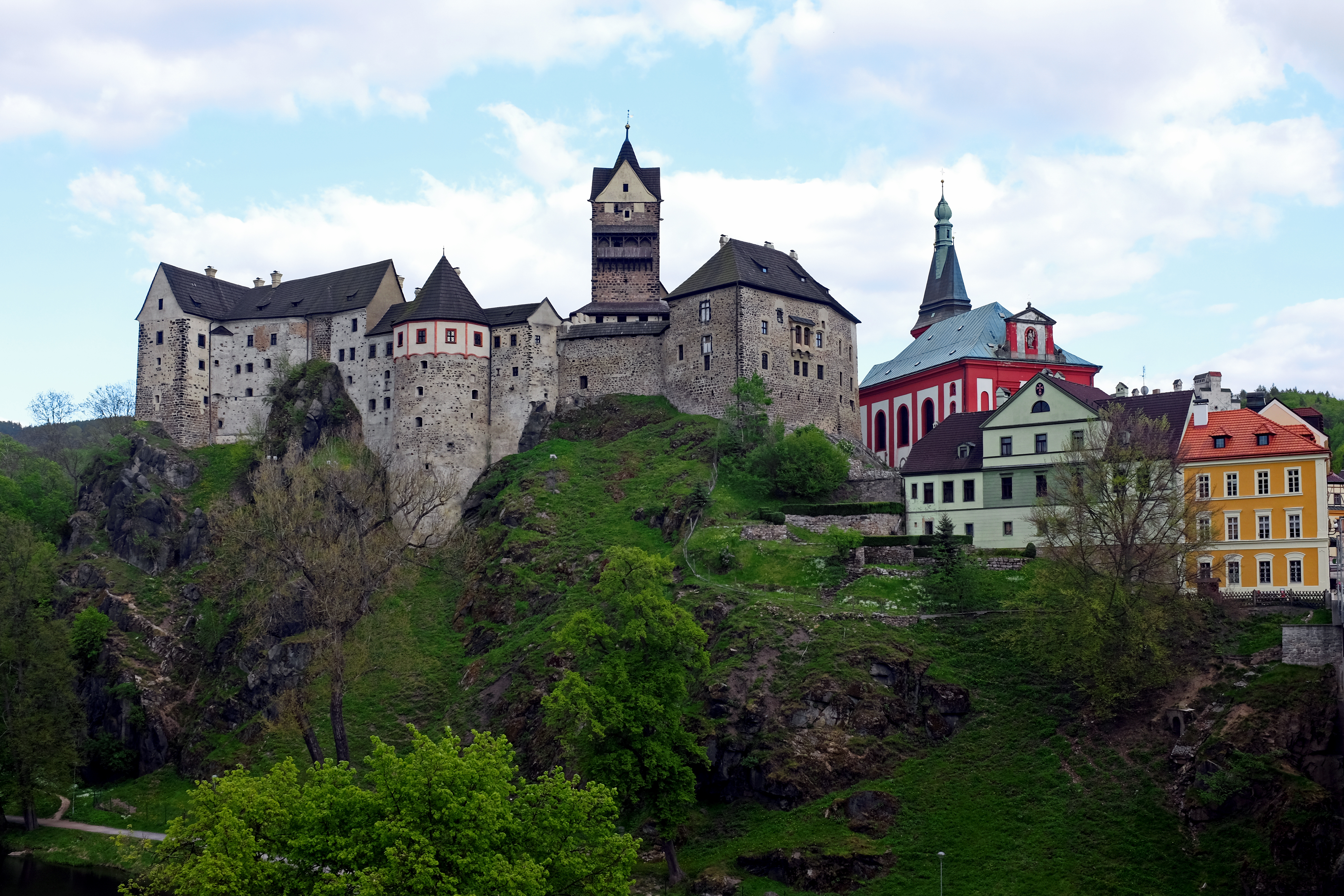
Loket Castle

The most visited historical monument in the town is Romanesque Loket Castle. In the days of the House of Luxembourg, the castle served as a temporary residence of members of the royal family. During the Thirty Years' War it was conquered and plundered by Swedish troops. The abandoned castle burned down in 1725, and was rebuilt into a regional jail in 1822.

The Church of Saint Wenceslaus was built in the Baroque style in 1701–1734. It replaced an older Gothic church.

Several fragments of the town's medieval fortifications have been preserved.

== In popular culture ==
Loket was used, in conjunction with Karlovy Vary, to portray a Montenegrin town in the 2006 James Bond film Casino Royale.

Loket fielded an assignment at Loket Castle and Svatoš rocks during the finale of the 21st season of the Dutch reality television series Wie is de Mol?.

== Notable people ==
- Ferdinand Pfohl (1862–1949), German music critic and composer
- Wolfgang von Schwind (1879–1949), Austrian actor and opera singer

== Twin towns – sister cities ==
Loket is twinned with:

- Illertissen, Germany
