= Widmannstätten (crater) =

Crater on the Moon

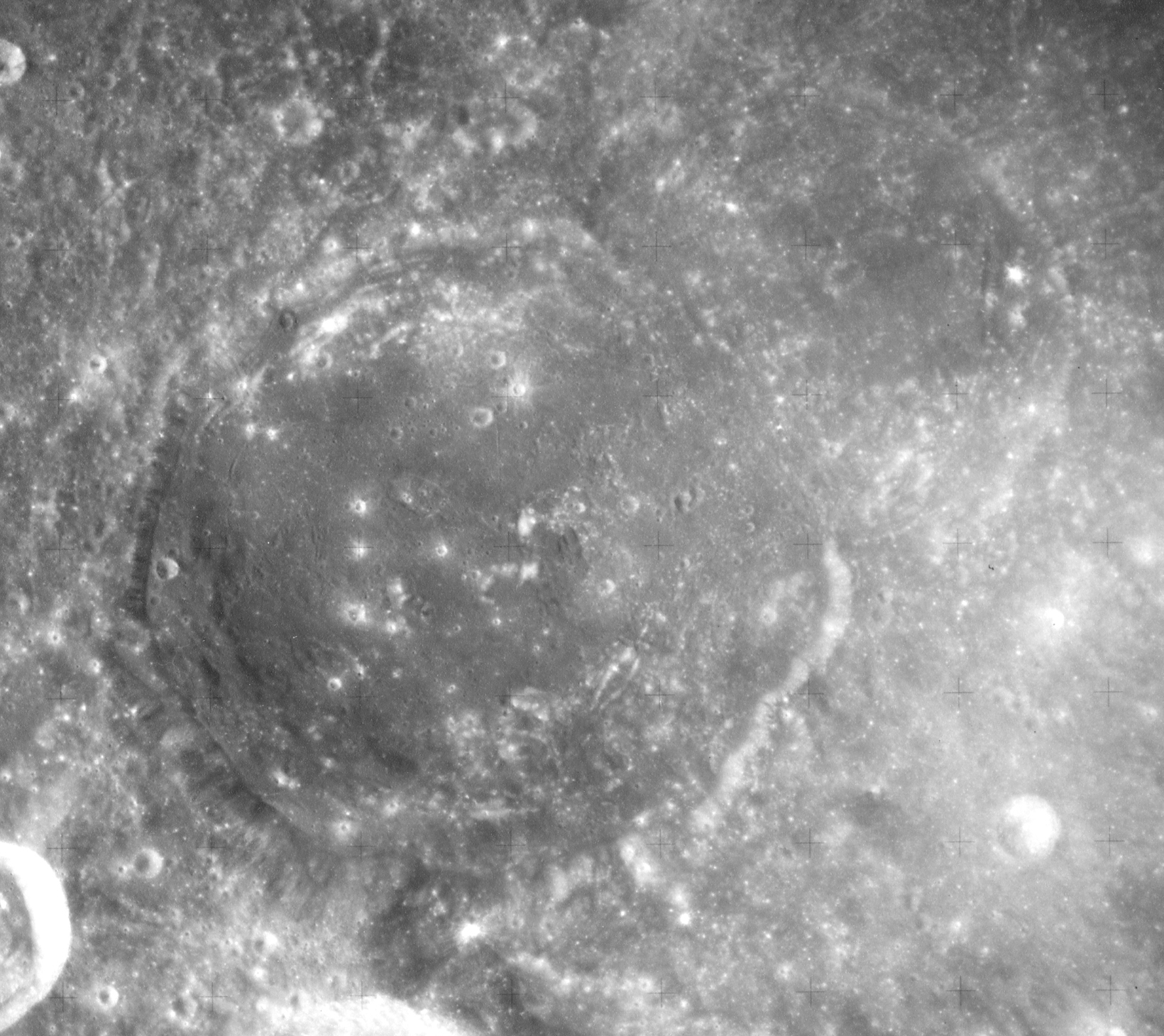
- Apollo 17 mapping camera image, Kiess at center and Widmannstätten in upper right
- Coordinates: 6.09°S 85.43°E
- Diameter: 52.88 km
- Depth: 0.74 km
- Colongitude: 275° at sunrise
- Eponym: Alois B. Widmannstätten

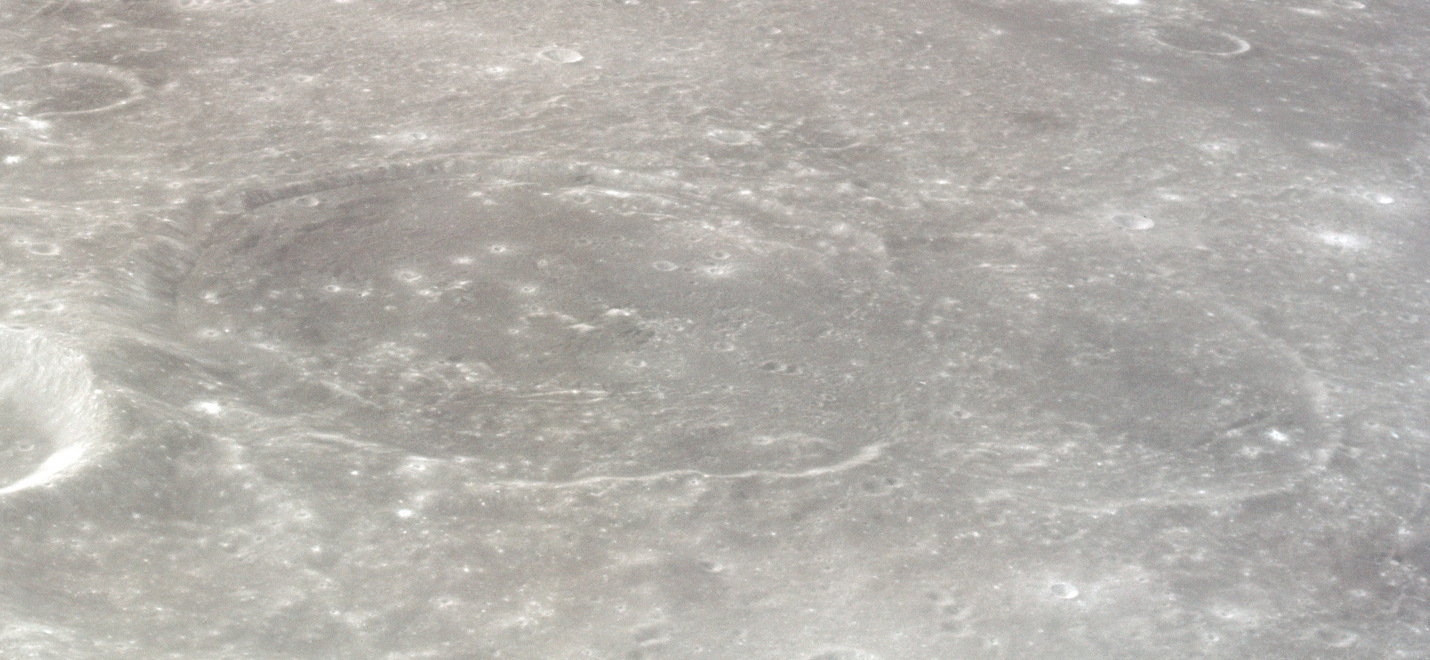
Oblique view of Kiess and Widmannstätten from Apollo 12

Widmannstätten is a lunar impact crater in the southern part of the Mare Smythii, near the eastern limb of the Moon. The rim of this crater has a wide gap along the western side, where it is joined to the larger Kiess. There is also a gap in the northern rim where the crater floor is joined to the adjacent lunar mare. The dark interior floor of this formation has been flooded by lava, leaving a level interior surface and a shallow surviving rim.

Both Kiess and Widmannstätten have fractured floors.

The craters Kiess and Widmannstätten were referred to as Wright Brothers, such as by the crew of Apollo 17, prior to being officially named by the IAU in 1973.
