= Krasnojarsk (meteorite) =

Meteorite

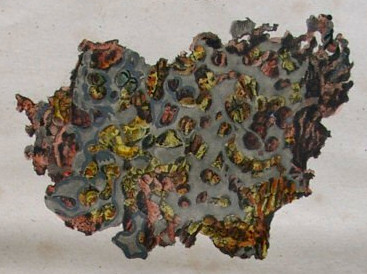
- Hand-colored drawing
- Type: Stony–iron
- Structural classification: Medium octahedrite
- Class: Pallasite
- Group: Pallasite Main Group
- Country: Russia
- Region: Krasnoyarsk Krai
- Coordinates: 54°54′N 91°48′E
- Observed fall: No
- Found date: 1749
- TKW: 700 kg

Krasnojarsk was the first pallasite meteorite ever found.

== History ==
A mass of about 700 kilograms (1,500 lb) was detected in 1749 about 145 miles south of Krasnoyarsk. The meteorite was found in 1749 by local blacksmith Yakov Medvedev and mining foreman IK Mettikh near the village of Medvedevo (the current territory of the Komsky Rural Council of the Novosyolovsky district of the Krasnoyarsk Krai).

In 1772, the unusual block was shown to Peter Simon Pallas, a Prussian explorer and geologist who was on an expedition in the area. On his instructions, the bulk of the lump—weighing about 40 pounds—was sent to St. Petersburg in 1773, and later delivered to the Kunstkamera in 1777.

Krasnojarsk was the first pallasite ever found and studied first time as meteorite in 1794 by Ernst Chladni, and led to the creation of the Pallasite group, named after Pallas.

It was also the first meteorite ever etched with acid (by G. Thomson) and therefore was the first one to show to human eyes the Widmanstätten pattern.

The main mass of 514.557 kilograms (1,134.40 lb) is now in Moscow at the Fersman Mineralogical Museum, Russian Academy of Sciences.

== Composition and classification ==
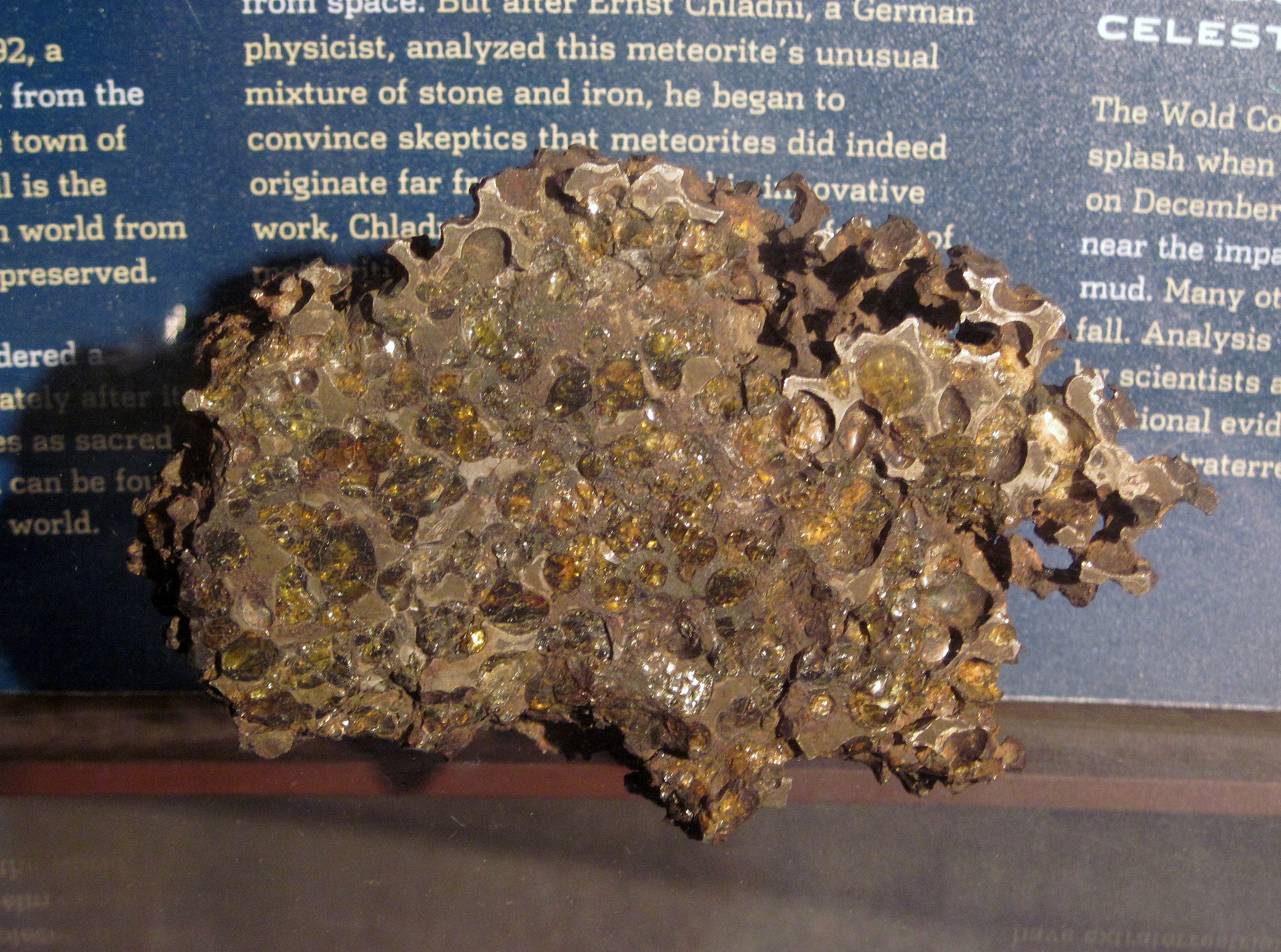
Krasnojarsk meteorite slice at the American Museum of Natural History.

It is a stony–iron meteorite of the Main Group Pallasite (MGP) group.

== See also ==
- Glossary of meteoritics
- Peter Simon Pallas
- G. Thomson
- Pallasite
