= Hrašćina =

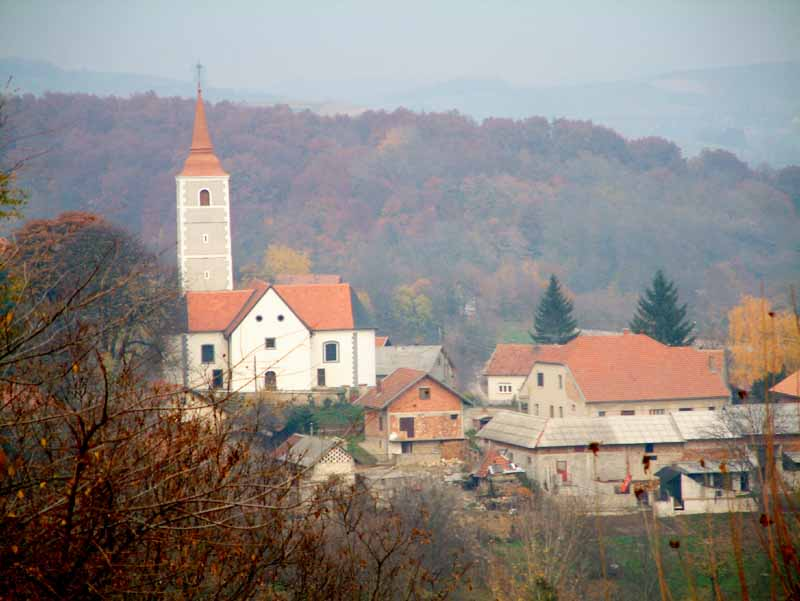

- Location within Croatia
- Coordinates: 46°6′36″N 16°13′12″E
- Country: Croatia
- County: Krapina-Zagorje County

Government
  - Mayor: Branko Tukač (HSS)

Area
  - Total: 27.3 km^{2} (10.5 sq mi)

Population (2021)
  - Total: 1,388
  - Density: 50.8/km^{2} (132/sq mi)
- Time zone: UTC+1 (CET)
  - Summer (DST): UTC+2 (CEST)
- Website: opcina-hrascina.hr

Hrašćina is a municipality in the Krapina-Zagorje County in Croatia. It is best known for the Hraschina meteorite.

== History ==
There are several valuable sacral buildings in the area of the Hrašćina municipality. One of the oldest is a Roman tombstone built into the statue of St. Anne in Hrašćina. In the settlement of Domovec, there is St. Mark's Pillar, erected in 1647 to celebrate the departure of the Ottoman Turks from the Hrašćina region. The Chapel of St. Benedict in Gornji Kraljevec is a protected cultural monument. The Chapel of Our Lady of Sorrows in Trgovišće was erected in 1735. The Parish Church of St. Nicholas in Hrašćina was built in the 17th century.

Hrašćina is known in the history of astronomy for the first documented meteorite fall on May 26, 1751. Since 2012, May 26 has been celebrated as the day of the Municipality of Hrašćina.

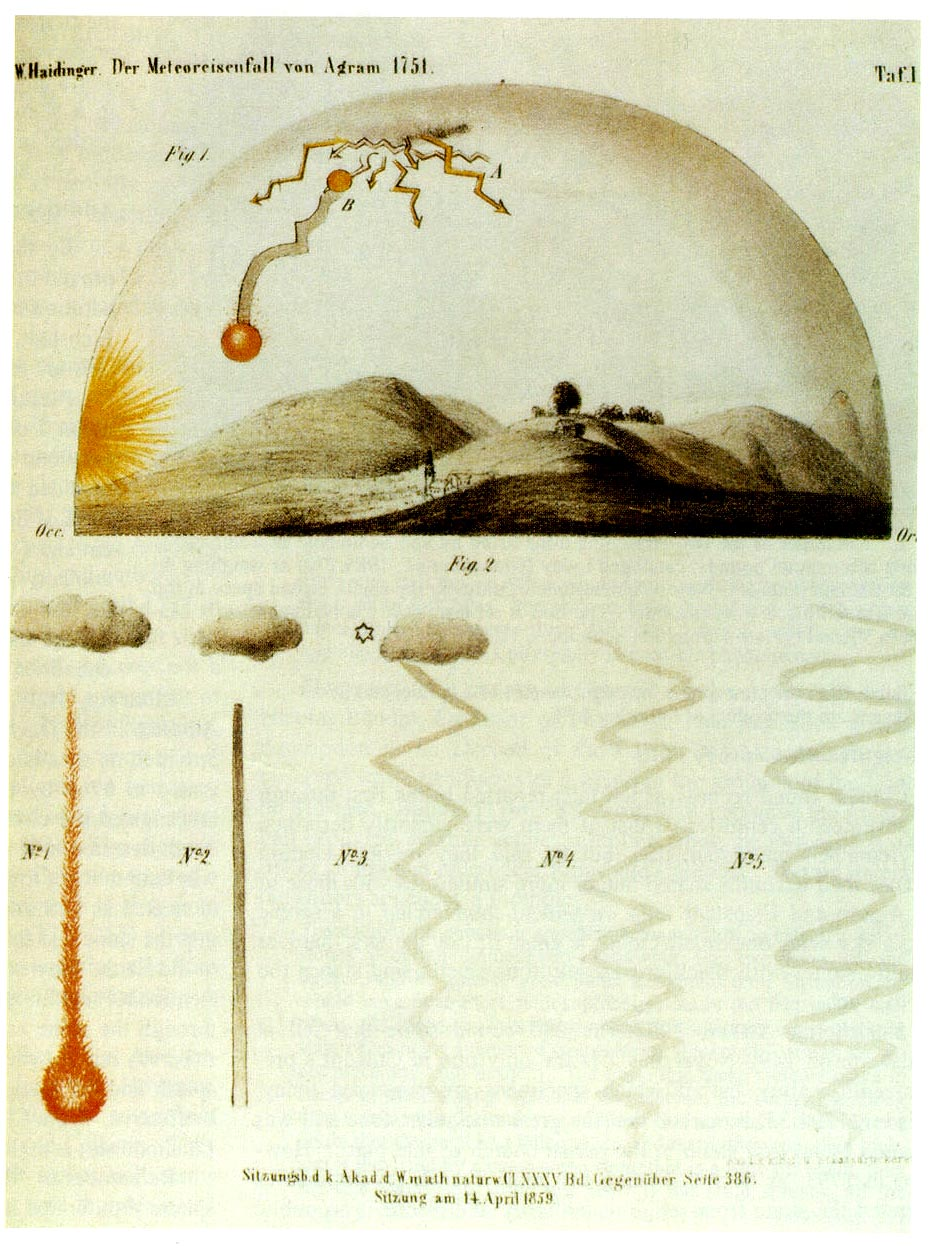
Hraschina meteorite, first documented fall in history, contemporary illustration

== Demographics ==
In the 2021 census, there were 1,388 inhabitants in the area, in the following settlements:

- Domovec, population 82
- Donji Kraljevec, population 118
- Gornjaki, population 104
- Gornji Kraljevec, population 333
- Hrašćina, population 76
- Husinec, population 97
- Jarek Habekov, population 144
- Maretić, population 121
- Trgovišće, population 55
- Vrbovo, population 258

In the same census, 98.7% of the population were Croats.

Hrašćina: Population trends 1857–2021
v

population	1154	1575	1786	2093	2649	3126	3163	3604	3556	3548	3238	2887	2375	2061	1826	1617	1388
	1857	1869	1880	1890	1900	1910	1921	1931	1948	1953	1961	1971	1981	1991	2001	2011	2021

Sources: Croatian Bureau of Statistics publications

== Administration ==
The current mayor of Hrašćina is Branko Tukač (HSS) and the Hrašćina Municipal Council consists of 9 seats.

Groups	Councilors per group
HSS	5 / 9
SDP-Reformists	3 / 9
HDZ	1 / 9
