= Widmanstätten pattern =

Crystal patterns found in some meteorites

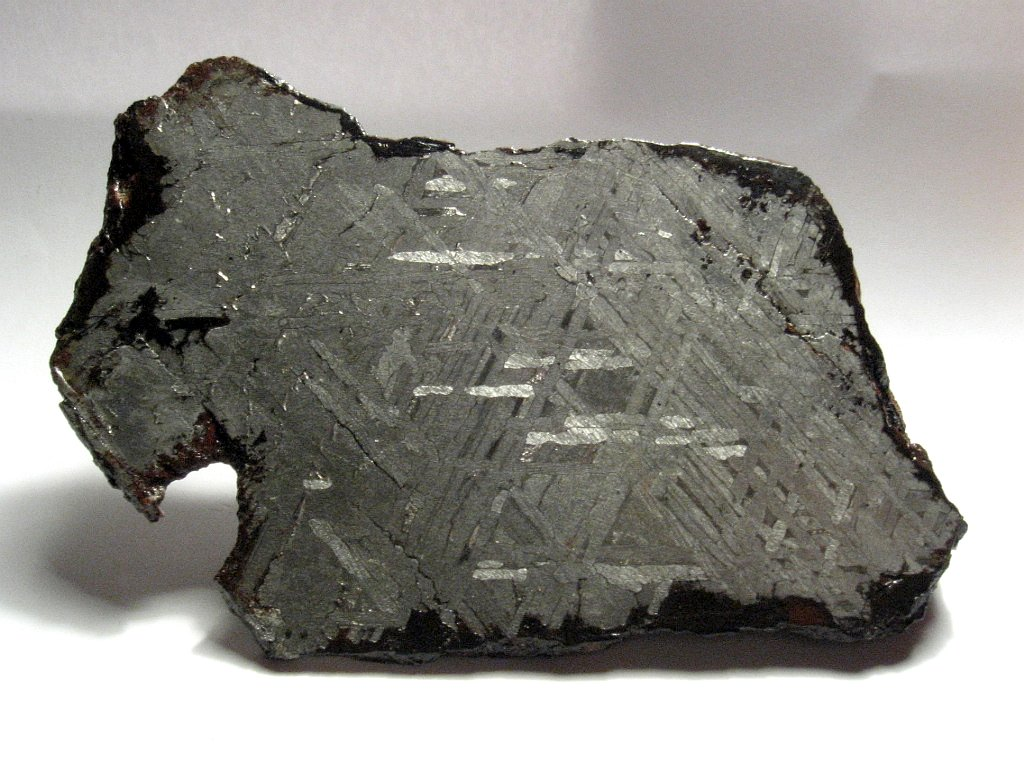
Segment of the Toluca meteorite, about 10 cm wide

A Widmanstätten pattern /ˈvɪdmɑːnˌʃteɪtɪn/ (VID-man-shtay-tin), also known as a Thomson structure, is a figure of long phases of nickel–iron, found in the octahedrite shapes of iron meteorite crystals and some pallasites.

Iron meteorites are very often formed from a single crystal of iron-nickel alloy, or sometimes several large crystals that may be many meters in size, and often lack any discernible crystal boundary on the surface. Large crystals are scarce in metals, and in meteorites they occur from extremely slow cooling from a molten state in the vacuum of space when the Solar System first formed. Once in the solid state, the slow cooling then allows the solid solution to precipitate a separate phase that grows within the crystal lattice, which forms at particular angles that are determined by the lattice. In meteors, these interstitial defects can grow large enough to fill the entire crystal with needle or ribbon-like structures easily visible to the naked eye, almost entirely consuming the original lattice. They consist of a fine interleaving of kamacite and taenite bands or ribbons called lamellae. Commonly, in gaps between the lamellae, a fine-grained mixture of kamacite and taenite called plessite can be found.

Widmanstätten structures describe analogous features in modern steels, titanium, and zirconium alloys, but are usually microscopic.

== Discovery ==
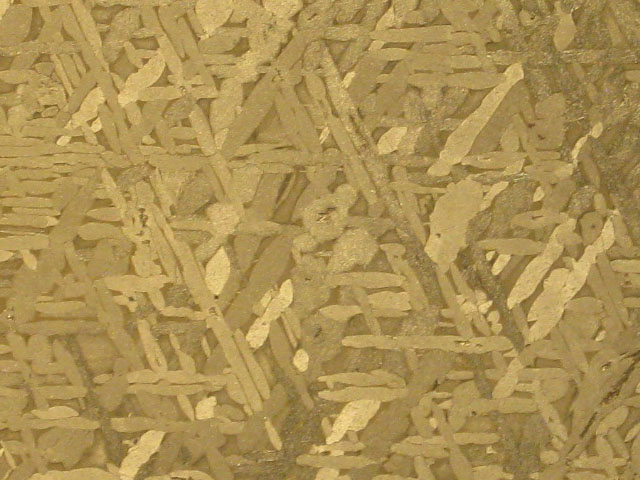
Widmanstätten pattern in the Staunton meteorite, found near Staunton, Virginia in the mid-19th century. Six pieces of nickel-iron were located over a period of some decades, with a total weight of 270 lb.

In 1808, these figures were observed by Count Alois von Beckh Widmanstätten, the director of the Imperial Porcelain works in Vienna. While flame heating iron meteorites, Widmanstätten noticed color and luster zone differentiation as the various iron alloys oxidized at different rates. He did not publish his findings, claiming them only via oral communication with his colleagues. The discovery was acknowledged by Carl von Schreibers, director of the Vienna Mineral and Zoology Cabinet, who named the structure after Widmanstätten. However, it is now believed that the discovery of the metal crystal pattern should be assigned to the English mineralogist William (Guglielmo) Thomson, as he published the same findings four years earlier.

Working in Naples in 1804, Thomson treated a Krasnojarsk meteorite with nitric acid to remove the dull patina caused by oxidation. Shortly after the acid made contact with the metal, strange figures appeared on the surface, which he detailed as described above. Civil wars and political instability in southern Italy made it difficult for Thomson to maintain contact with his colleagues in England. This was demonstrated in his loss of important correspondence when its carrier was murdered. As a result, in 1804, his findings were only published in French in the Bibliothèque Britannique. At the beginning of 1806, Napoleon invaded the Kingdom of Naples and Thomson was forced to flee to Sicily and in November of that year, he died in Palermo at the age of 46. In 1808, Thomson's work was again published posthumously in Italian (translated from the original English manuscript) in Atti dell'Accademia Delle Scienze di Siena. The Napoleonic Wars obstructed Thomson's contacts with the scientific community and his travels across Europe, in addition to his early death, obscured his contributions for many years.

== Nomenclature ==
The most common names for these figures are Widmanstätten pattern and Widmanstätten structure; however, there are some spelling variations:

- Widmanstetter (proposed by Frederick C. Leonard)
- Widmannstätten (used for example for the Widmannstätten lunar crater)
- Widmanstatten (Anglicized)

Due to the discovery priority of G. Thomson, several authors suggested calling these figures Thomson structure or Thomson-Widmanstätten structure.

== Formation ==
Phase diagram explaining how the pattern forms. First meteoric iron is exclusively composed of taenite. When cooling it passes a phase boundary where kamacite is exsolved from taenite. Meteoric iron with less than about 6% nickel (hexahedrite) is completely changed to kamacite.

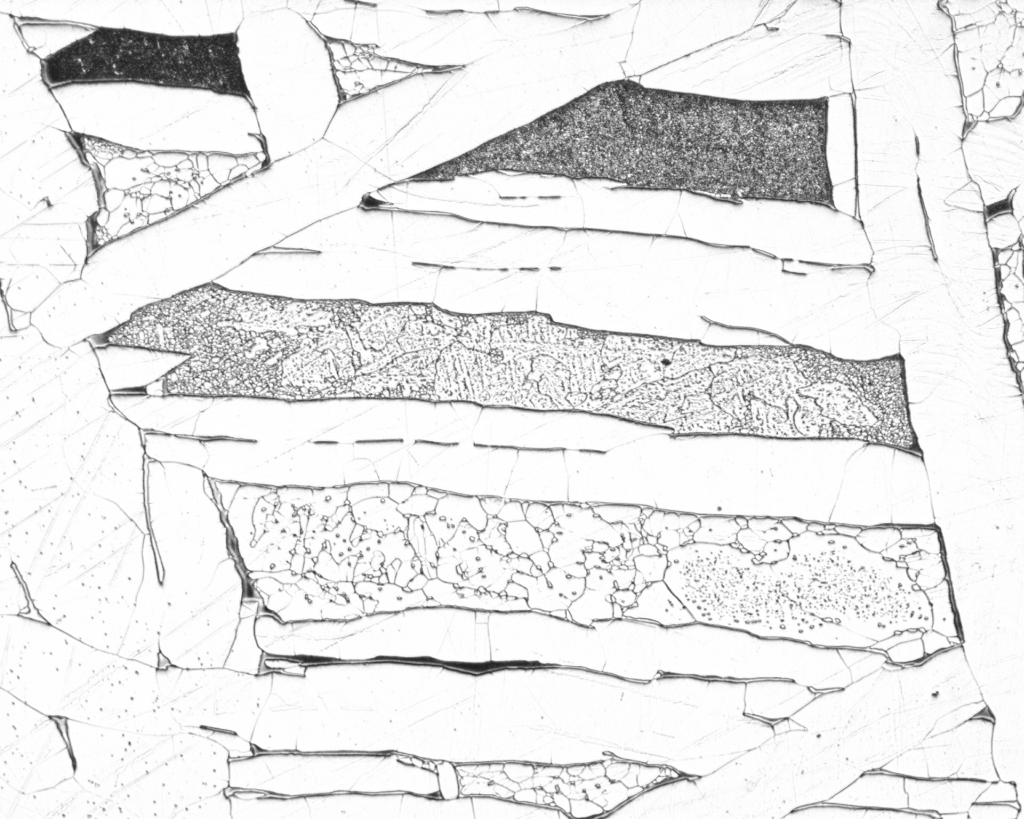
Widmanstätten pattern, metallographic polished section

The formation of Ni-poor kamacite proceeds by diffusion of Ni in the solid alloy at temperatures between 450 and 700 °C, and can only take place during very slow cooling, about 100 to 10,000 °C/Myr, with total cooling times of 10 Myr or less. This explains why this structure cannot be reproduced in the laboratory.

The crystalline patterns become visible when the meteorites are cut, polished, and acid-etched, because taenite is more resistant to the acid.

The dimension of kamacite lamellae ranges from coarsest to finest (upon their size) as the nickel content increases. This classification is called structural classification.

== Preparation ==
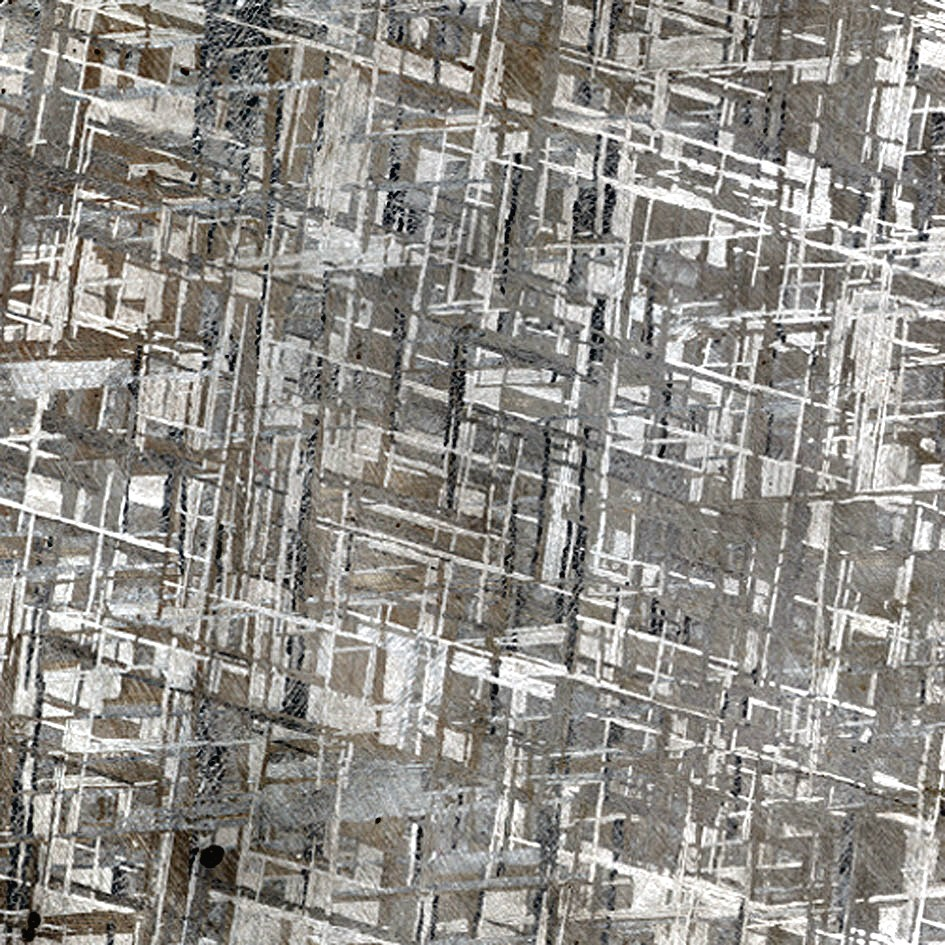
The fine Widmanstätten pattern (lamellae width 0.3mm) of a Gibeon meteorite.

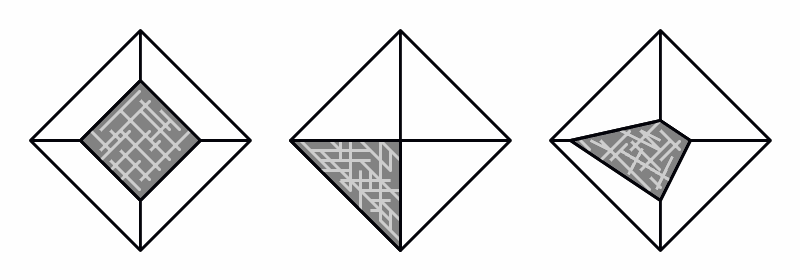
Different cuts produce different Widmanstätten patterns

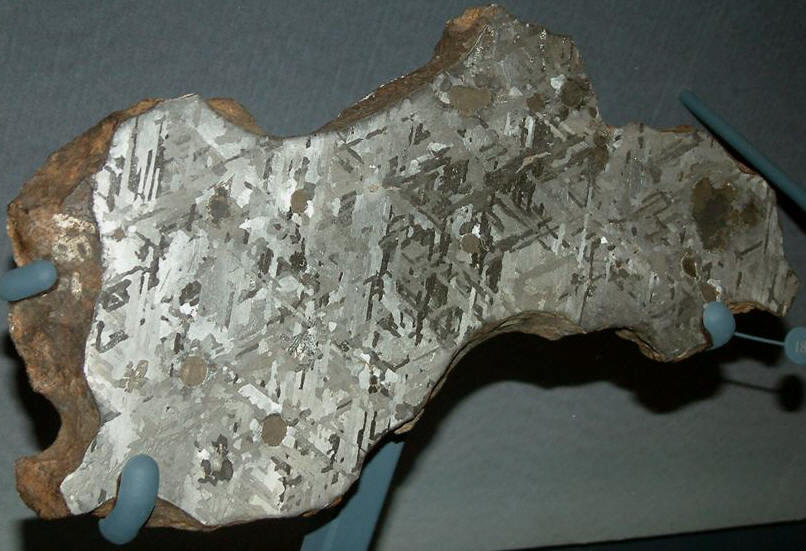
Etched slice of a Canyon Diablo meteorite showing a Widmanstätten pattern

Iron and nickel form homogeneous alloys at temperatures below the melting point; these alloys are taenite. At temperatures below 900 to 600 °C (depending on the Ni content), two alloys with different nickel content are stable: kamacite with lower Ni-content (5 to 15% Ni) and taenite with high Ni (up to 50%). Octahedrite meteorites have a nickel content intermediate between the norm for kamacite and taenite; this leads under slow cooling conditions to the precipitation of kamacite and growth of kamacite plates along certain crystallographic planes in the taenite crystal lattice.

The methods used to reveal the Widmanstätten pattern on iron meteorites vary. Most commonly, the slice is ground and polished, cleaned, etched with a chemical such as nitric acid or ferric chloride, washed, and dried.

Cutting the meteorite along different planes affects the shape and direction of Widmanstätten figures because kamacite lamellae in octahedrites are precisely arranged. Octahedrites derive their name from the crystal structure paralleling an octahedron. Opposite faces are parallel, so, although an octahedron has 8 faces, there are only 4 sets of kamacite plates. Iron and nickel-iron form crystals with an external octahedral structure only very rarely, but these orientations are still plainly detectable crystallographically without the external habit. Cutting an octahedrite meteorite along different planes (or any other material with octahedral symmetry, which is a subclass of cubic symmetry) will result in one of these cases:

- perpendicular cut to one of the three (cubic) axes: two sets of bands at right angles to each other
- parallel cut to one of the octahedron faces (cutting all 3 cubic axes at the same distance from the crystallographic center) : three sets of bands running at 60° angles to each other
- any other angle: four sets of bands with different angles of intersection

== Non-meteoritic materials ==
The term Widmanstätten structure is also used on non-meteoritic material to indicate a structure with a geometrical pattern resulting from the formation of a new phase along particular crystallographic planes of the parent phase, such as the basketweave structure in some zirconium alloys. The Widmanstätten structures form due to the growth of new phases within the grain boundaries of the parent metals, generally increasing the hardness and brittleness of the metal. The structures form due to the precipitation of a single crystal phase into two separate phases. In this way, the Widmanstätten transformation differs from other transformations, such as a martensite or ferrite transformation. The structures form at very precise angles, which may vary depending on the arrangement of the crystal lattices. These are usually very small structures that must be viewed through a microscope because a very long cooling rate is generally needed to produce structures visible to the naked eye. However, they usually have a great and often an undesirable effect on the properties of the alloy.

Widmanstätten structures tend to form within a specific temperature range, growing larger over time. In carbon steel, for example, Widmanstätten structures form during tempering if the steel is held within a range around 500 °F (260 °C) for long periods. These structures form as needle or plate-like growths of cementite within the crystal boundaries of the martensite. This increases the brittleness of the steel in a way that can only be relieved by recrystallizing. Widmanstätten structures made from ferrite sometimes occur in carbon steel, if the carbon content is below but near the eutectoid composition (~ 0.8% carbon). This happens as long needles of ferrite within the pearlite.

Widmanstätten structures form in many other metals as well. They will form in brass, especially if the alloy has a very high zinc content, becoming needles of zinc in the copper matrix. The needles will usually form when the brass cools from the recrystallization temperature, and will become very coarse if the brass is annealed to 1,112 °F (600 °C) for long periods. Telluric iron, which is an iron-nickel alloy very similar to meteorites, also displays very coarse Widmanstätten structures. Telluric iron is metallic iron, rather than an ore (in which iron is usually found), and it originated from the Earth rather than from space. Telluric iron is a scarce metal, found only in a few places in the world. Like meteorites, the very coarse Widmanstätten structures most likely develop through very slow cooling, except that the cooling occurred in the Earth's mantle and crust rather than in the vacuum and microgravity of space. Such patterns have also been seen in mulberry, a ternary uranium alloy, after aging at or below 400 °C for periods of minutes to hours produces a monoclinic ɑ″ phase.

However, the appearance, the composition, and the formation process of these terrestrial Widmanstätten structures are different from the characteristic structure of iron meteorites.

When an iron meteorite is forged into a tool or weapon, the Widmanstätten patterns remain but become stretched and distorted. The patterns usually cannot be fully eliminated by blacksmithing, even through extensive working. When a knife or tool is forged from meteoric iron and then polished, the patterns appear on the surface of the metal, albeit distorted. Still, they tend to retain some of the original octahedral shapes and the appearance of thin lamellae crisscrossing each other.

== Uses ==
Since nickel-iron crystals grow to lengths of some centimeters only when the solid metal cools down at an exceptionally slow rate (over several million years), the presence of these patterns is strongly suggestive of extraterrestrial origin of the material, and can be used to indicate if a piece of iron may come from a meteorite.

== See also ==
- Acicular ferrite – Steel microstructure characterized by long needle-like grains
- Glossary of meteoritics
