= William Thomson (mineralogist) =

English physician and geologist

Guglielmo Thomson
- Born: William Thomson; 1760
- Died: 1806 (aged 45–46); Palermo, Kingdom of Sicily
- Occupation: Geologist
- Known for: Discovery of Widmanstätten pattern

William Thomson (1760 – November 1806) was an English mineralogist, who used the name Guglielmo Thomson in Italy in later life. He died in Palermo at the age of 46 years.

== Discovery of Widmanstätten pattern ==
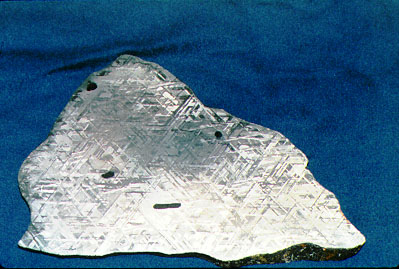
A Widmanstätten pattern appears when certain types of iron meteorite are etched with nitric acid

Thomson at the time was living in Naples. One day he decided to treat a sample of the Krasnojarsk meteorite with nitric acid for the purpose of cleaning it of rust. Shortly after the contact with acid he noticed on the surface of the metal a strange never seen before figures: it was the later-called Widmanstätten pattern.

In 1804, his discovery was published in the Bibliothèque Britannique, in French. After his death, his work was published in 1808 in Italian (translated from the original English manuscript) on Atti dell'Accademia Delle Scienze di Siena.

The discovery is commonly referred to as the Widmanstätten pattern after a similar discovery in 1808 by Count Alois von Beckh Widmanstätten, the director of the Imperial Porcelain works in Vienna, while flame heating iron meteorites, probably due to the early death of Thomson and the lack of an English publication. The discovery of Widmanstätten was independent, but he did not publish his findings after he noticed color and luster zone differentiation as the various iron alloys oxidized at different rates. His findings were merely orally communication with his colleagues. The discovery was acknowledged by Carl von Schreibers, director of the Vienna Mineral and Zoology Cabinet, who named the structure after Widmanstätten.

Due to chronological priority, the full credit of the discovery should be assigned to Thomson (1804). For this reason, several authors have suggested that the pattern could also be called the Thomson structure.

== See also ==
- Glossary of meteoritics
