= Northwest Africa 7325 =

Meteorite

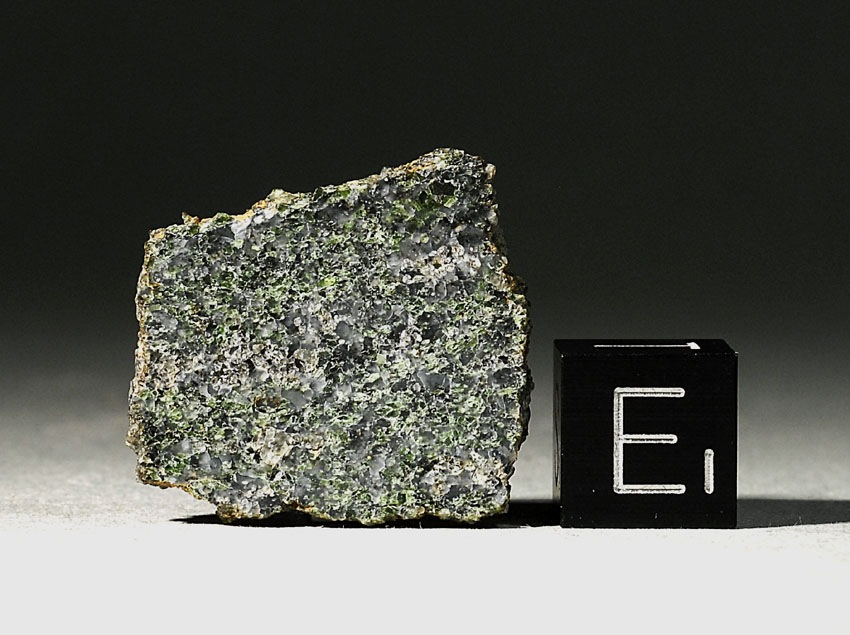
- A 2.810-gram (0.0991 oz) slice of Northwest Africa 7325 with green chromium diopside crystals.
- Type: Achondrite
- Country: Morocco
- Region: Northwest Africa
- Observed fall: No
- Found date: 2012
- TKW: 345 grams (12.2 oz)

Northwest Africa 7325, also known as NWA 7325, is a unique igneous meteorite which crystallized as a basalt on a large asteroid or planetesimal approximately 4.56 billion years ago. It is classified as an ungrouped achondrite, and is notable for its green fusion crust and high-magnesium/low-iron composition. It was purchased from anonymous finders in a marketplace in Erfoud, Morocco in April 2012. The original find was composed of 35 fragments with a combined weight of approximately 345 grams (12.2 oz), however many additional fragments with a total weight of over 1,100 grams (39 oz) were subsequently recovered.

Investigation of the meteorite by Dr. Anthony Irving at the University of Washington determined that the meteorite's composition might be consistent with that of Mercury as determined by the MESSENGER spacecraft. Irving cautioned, however, that NWA 7325 could also have come from a smaller differentiated planetesimal. Dr. Irving had previously claimed that a different class of basaltic meteorites, angrites might be from Mercury.

Later studies cast doubt upon the meteorite's association with Mercury by comparing FTIR spectra obtained from the meteorite to astronomical results of the planet's surface; the observed differences suggest that the meteorite is not from Mercury. Additionally, NWA 7325's relatively early crystallization age suggests that it formed on a small body that cooled rapidly after accreting. Mercury is far larger and any samples from the planet's surface would likely be ~10^{8} years younger.
