= Balbino de Freitas Archaeological Collection =

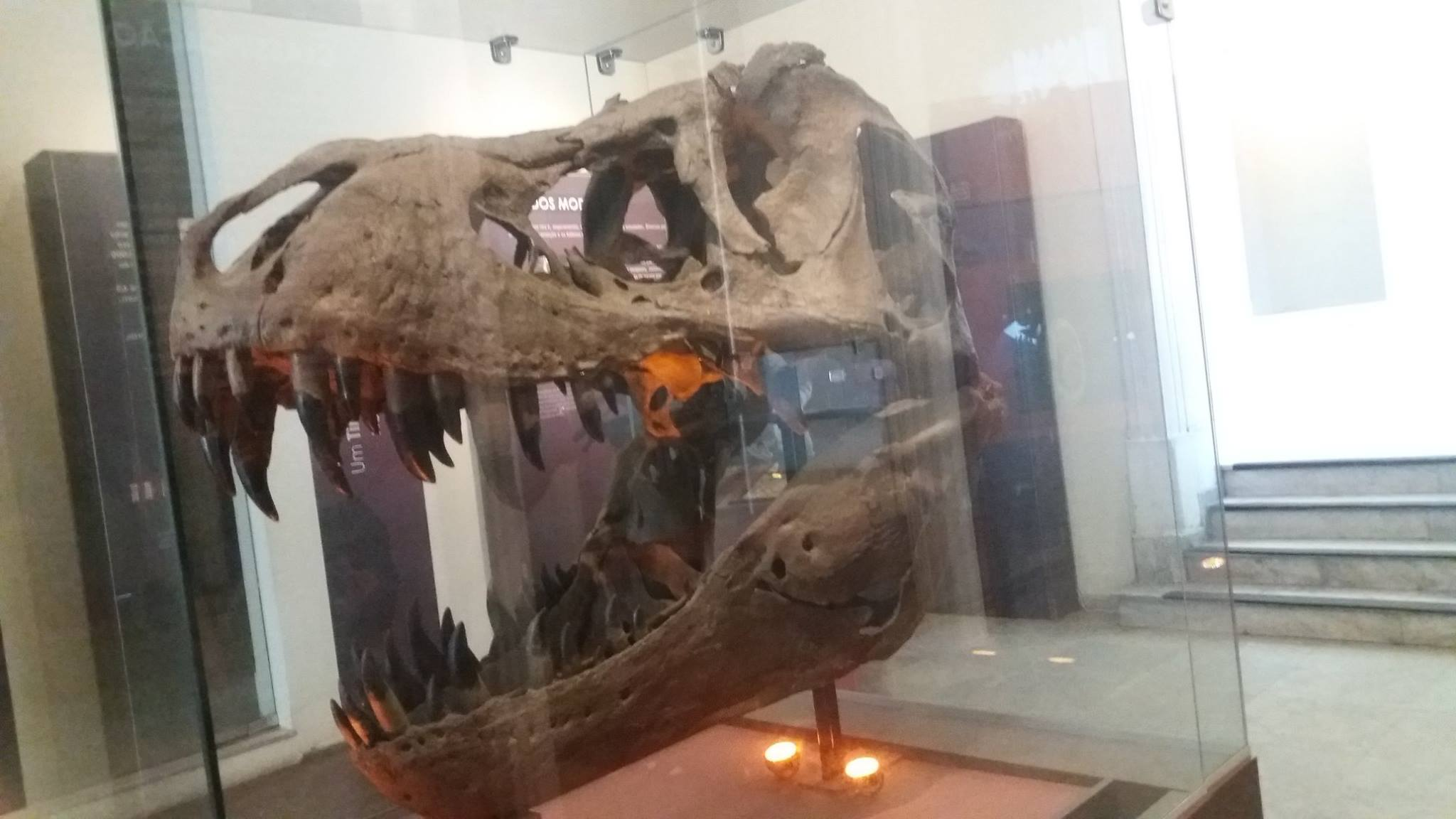
Dinosaur skull from the Balbino de Freitas Archaeological Collection

The Balbino de Freitas Archaeological Collection was one of the collections on display in National Museum of Brazil, in Rio de Janeiro. It reunited works belonging to the house of Balbino Luiz de Freitas, one of the first archaeological collections of Brazil. The collection was listed by the IPHAN in 1938.

The collection was assembled by Freitas, especially with indigenous objects of Torres. A basket was one of the main elements of the collection, collected in a sambaqui in the coastal area. The importance of the piece is given by the difficult maintenance of objects made with organic material in tropical countries, such as Brazil.

This archaeological collection was, at least in part, destroyed in the fire of 2018 in the National Museum.

== Bibliography ==
- SOUZA, Helena V. L. de. A Coleção Balbino de Freitas e o Museu Nacional. UNIRIO, Museu de Astronomia e Ciências Afins/ MAST – Rio deJaneiro, 87p, 2012.
