= Angra dos Reis (disambiguation) =

Angra dos Reis may refer to:

- Angra dos Reis — a municipality located in the southern part of the Brazilian state of Rio de Janeiro
- Angra dos Reis (song)
- Angra dos Reis meteorite
- Angra dos Reis Esporte Clube
