= Angra dos Reis meteorite =

Meteorite found in Brazil

Angra dos Reis
- Type: Achondrite
- Group: Angrite
- Composition: Fassaite (93%)
- Country: Brazil
- Region: Angra dos Reis
- Coordinates: 22°58′S 44°19′W
- Observed fall: Yes
- Fall date: 20 January 1869
- TKW: 1.5 kilograms (3.3 lb)

The Angra dos Reis meteorite is the type specimen of the angrite group. It was observed when it fell to Earth in 1869.

== Discovery and naming ==
The meteorite is named after Angra dos Reis, a municipality of Rio de Janeiro, Brazil. It fell on 20 January 1869 into the bay where the water was about 2 meters deep. Two fragments were found by a diver the next day.

== Museum ==
The National Museum of Brazil holds the meteorite as part of its meteorite collection. After the museum's 2018 fire, there were concerns that it was lost in the rubble of the museum. Some meteorites were found on October 19, 2018, including the Angra dos Reis.

== Mineralogy ==
Although it is the type specimen of the angrites, Angra dos Reis is actually very different from most other angrites. It consists almost entirely of a rare form of pyroxene called fassaite. This makes it more like a pyroxenite than the typical angrite, which is similar to a basalt. The only other meteorite samples that contain fassaite are the calcium-aluminium-rich inclusions found in the Allende meteorite. The reason for this exotic composition is thought to be partial melting of a chondritic precursor under reduction-oxidation (redox) conditions in which meteoric iron is unstable.
