= Bendegó meteorite (report) =

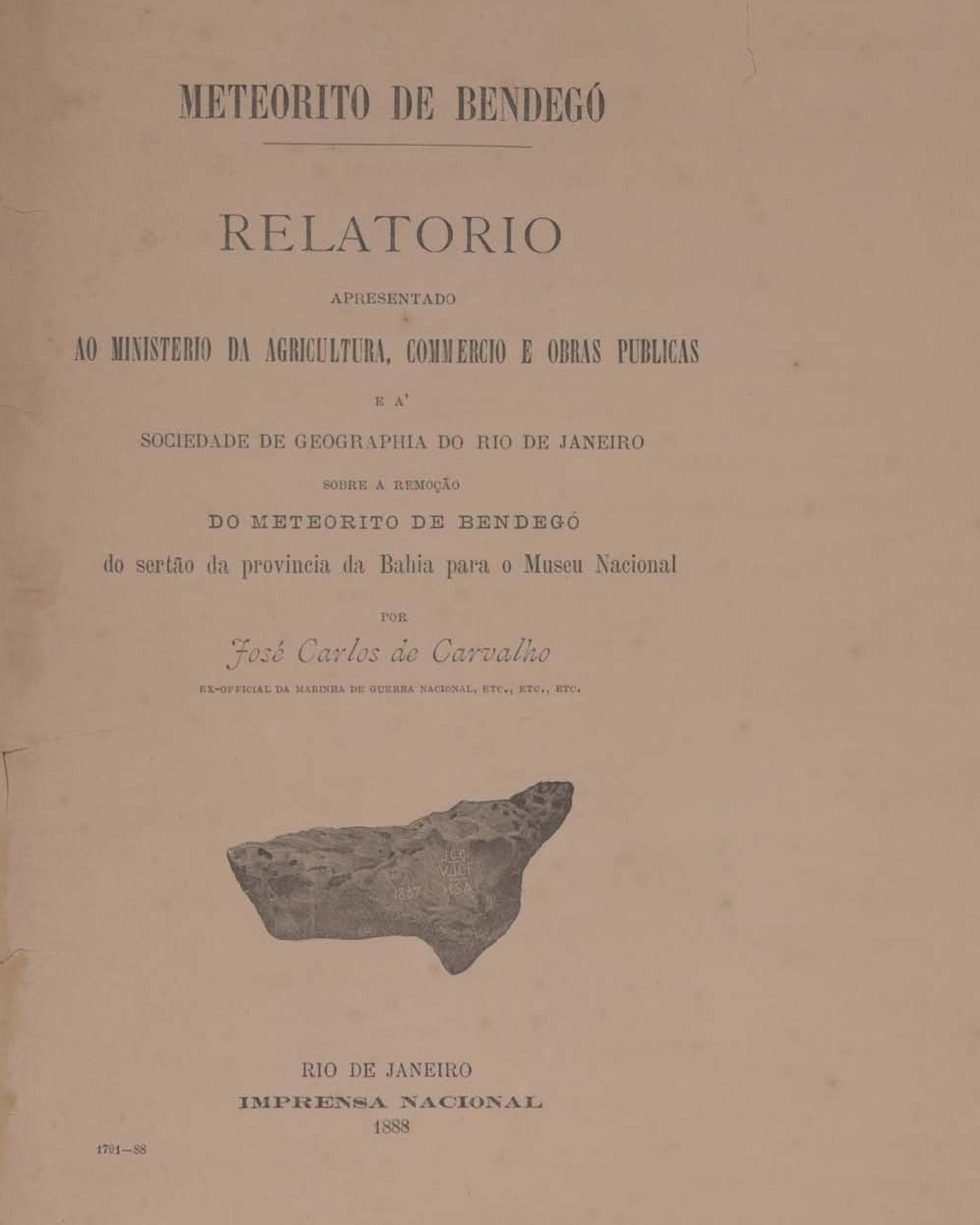
- Author: José Carlos de Carvalho
- Language: Portuguese
- Publisher: Imprensa Nacional
- Publication date: 1888
- Publication place: Brazil
- Media type: Physical
- Pages: 79
- OCLC: 182930366

Meteorito de Bendegó – relatório apresentado ao ministerio da agricultura, commercio e obras publicas e a sociedade de geographia do Rio de Janeiro sobre a remoção do meteorito de Bendengó do sertão da provincia da Bahia para o Museu Nacional is a book written by José Carlos de Carvalho and published in 1888 in Portuguese and French. It deals with the transportation of the Bendegó meteorite from Bahia to the National Museum, under the command of the Emperor Dom Pedro II.

Carvalho, a retired military man from the Paraguayan War, was in charge of transporting the meteorite. He led an Empire Commission for Transport, initially concerned with how to take the meteorite to the Jacuricy Railway Station. Also described in the book is the carret designed by Carvalho for transportation.

In the hinterland, the Imperial Commission traveled 113 kilometers in 126 days to the train station. From there they embarked for Salvador – a distance of 363 kilometers – and arrived in the capital of Bahia on 22 May 1888. Heavy, the meteorite was then 5,360 kg. Then, they left for Rio de Janeiro.

Carvalho's work, illustrated with meteorite and transport images, was in the Central Library of the National Museum, bringing the author's dedication to the National Museum. On the cover is the Imperial Coat of Arms.

The work begins with the following paragraph:

In 1784, Joaquim do Motto Botelho informed the Governor-General of Bahia, D. Rodrigo José de Menezes, that he had found an extraordinary stone in the vicinity of the Bendegó stream, supposing to contain gold and silver.

According to WorldCat, the University of São Paulo is in possession of a copy of the bilingual book. Other places that also have a copy are: The Field Museum Library (US), University of Wisconsin - Milwaukee (US), Carleton College Library (US), Stanford University Libraries (US) and Natural History Museum (UK).

== Gallery of artwork illustrations ==
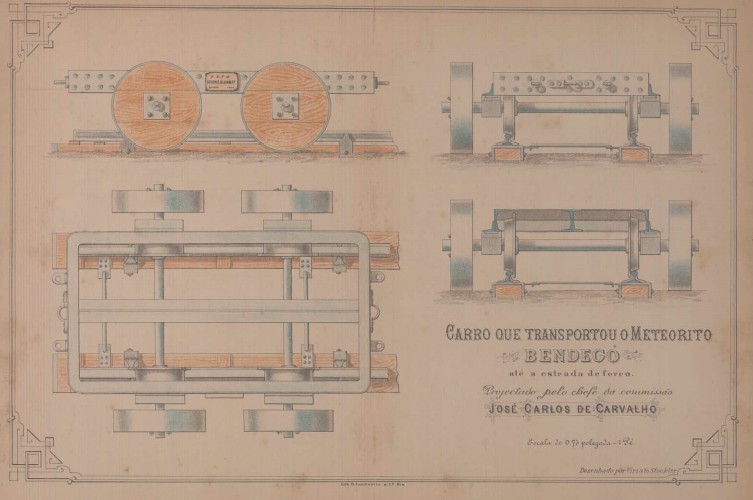
Carret designed for meteorite transport

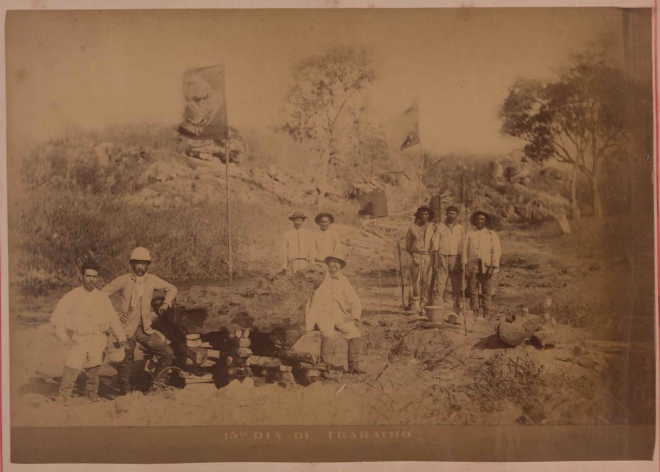
Meteorite Transport Photography
