= Collection of Mediterranean antiquities in the National Museum of Brazil =

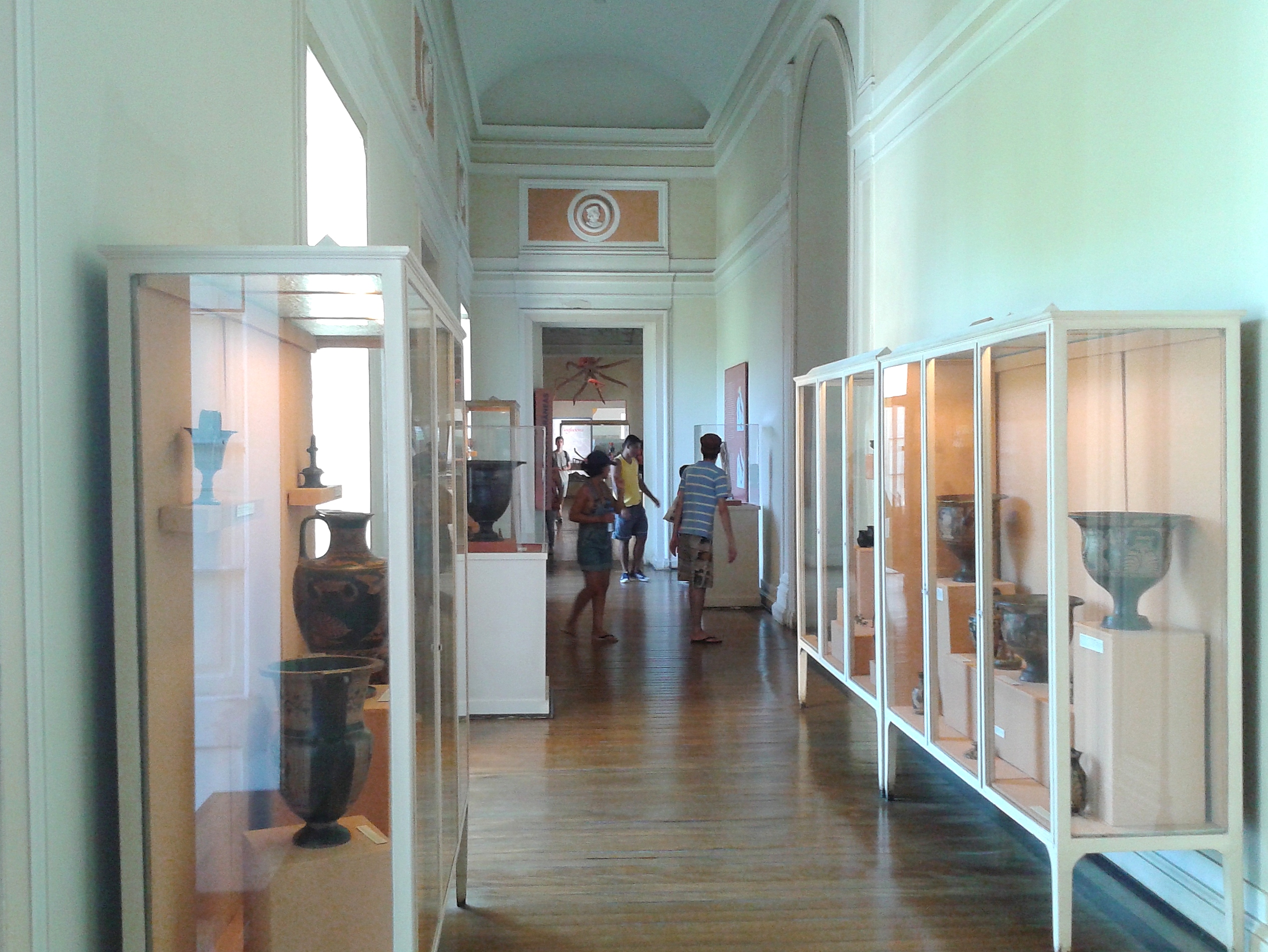
Exhibition of Greco-Roman antiquities in the museum.

The National Museum of Rio de Janeiro collections include an exhibition of Mediterranean antiquities from Etruscan, Greek (Italiote) and Roman civilizations.

The current status of the collection is unknown after the fire that destroyed the museum in 2018.

Image	Name	Origin	Date	Notes
	Proto-Corinthian Ring Askos	Greek (Italiote) civilization	7th century B.C.	
	Mirrors	Greek (Italiote) civilization	6th century B.C.	
	Caryatid chalice	Etruscan civilization	c. 620-560 B.C.	
	Fresco from Pompeii: Basket and birds	Roman civilization	1st century A.D.	
	Red-figure chalice krater	Greek (Italiote) civilization	4th century B.C.	
	Red-figure bell krater	Greek (Italiote) civilization	4th century B.C.	
	Corinthian oinochoe with lid	Greek (Italiote) civilization	c. 600-575 B.C.	
	Proto-Corinthian oinochoe	Greek (Italiote) civilization	7th century B.C.	
	Statue of a headless woman	Greek or Roman civilization	5th century B.C.	
	Frasco geminado com duas alças	Roman civilization		
	Square-shaped flask with handle	Roman civilization	1st century A.D.	
	Etruscan warrior	Etruscan civilization	5th century B.C.	
	Fresco from Pompeii: Peacocks	Roman civilization	1st century A.D.	
	Female nude torso	Greek or Roman civilization		
	Fresco from Pompeii: Seahorse	Roman civilization	1st century A.D.	
	Fresco from Pompeii: Sea dragon	Roman civilization	1st century A.D.	

== See also ==
- National Museum of Brazil
