= José Carlos de Carvalho =

Brazilian politician (1847–1934)

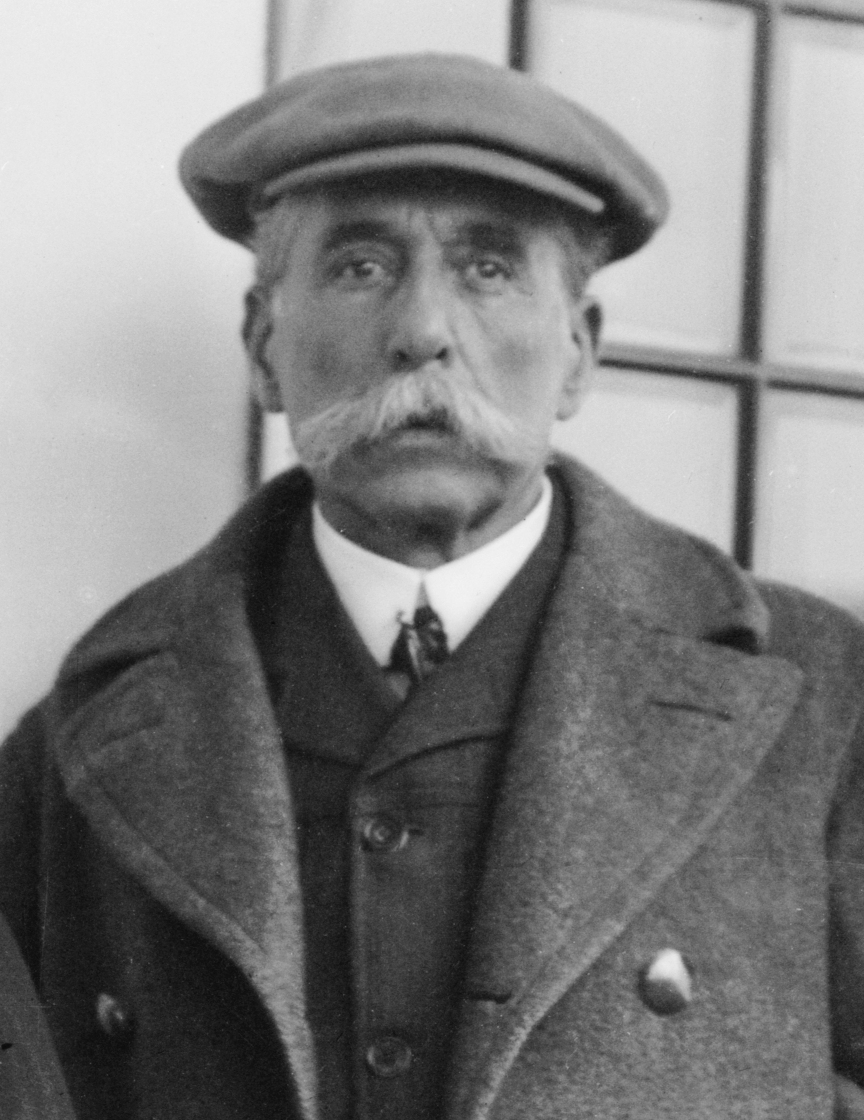
- José Carlos de Carvalho, c. 1910–1915

Personal details
- Born: José Carlos de Carvalho Júnior; 2 September 1847 Rio de Janeiro, Empire of Brazil
- Died: 28 February 1934 (aged 86) Brazil
- Parents: José Carlos de Carvalho (father); Antonia de Ferraz de Carvalho (mother)

Military service
- Allegiance: Empire of Brazil
- Branch/service: Imperial Brazilian Navy
- Years of service: 1865–1911
- Rank: Rear Admiral
- Commands: Head of the Navy
- Battles/wars: Paraguayan War

José Carlos de Carvalho Júnior (2 September 1847 – 28 February 1934) was a Brazilian rear admiral and politician in the Empire of Brazil, best known for his service in the Paraguayan War and for the retrieval of the Bendegó meteorite.

== Early life and Paraguayan War ==
José Carlos de Carvalho Júnior was born in Rio de Janeiro on 2 September 1847. His father, after whom he was named, was an officer of the fire brigade. Carvalho attended the Colégio Pedro II before entering the navy as a midshipman. During the Paraguayan War he took part in the 19 February 1868 Passage of Humaitá in which Brazilian vessels forced a passage along the Paraguay River against Paraguayan artillery. Wounded in action, he was rewarded for his service by a promotion to second lieutenant and appointment as a grand knight of the Imperial Order of the Southern Cross. He was wounded in the 30 December 1868 Battle of Angostura. At the war's end in 1870 he was awarded the Military Merit medal for bravery.

== Later career ==
In 1887 he took part in the expedition that retrieved the Bendegó meteorite from the interior of Bahia. The meteorite had been discovered in the late 18th century but had been abandoned for more than a hundred years after an unsuccessful attempt to carry it to the court in Rio de Janeiro.

Carvalho helpted to suppress the Brazilian Naval Revolts of 1893. In 1910 he negotiated the return of Brazilian naval vessels to government control from mutineers following the Revolt of the Lash. He published an account of the revolt in his 1912 memoirs. By 1912 he had retired and offered his services to a University Museum Philadelphia, Amazon exploring expedition that would be led by William Curtis Farabee. He also became involved in the rubber industry, introducing a method of producing the rubber in sheets, rather than the ball method previously employed. He was a member of the Geographical Society of Rio de Janeiro. Carvalho died on 28 February 1934, having reached the rank of rear admiral.

== Gallery ==
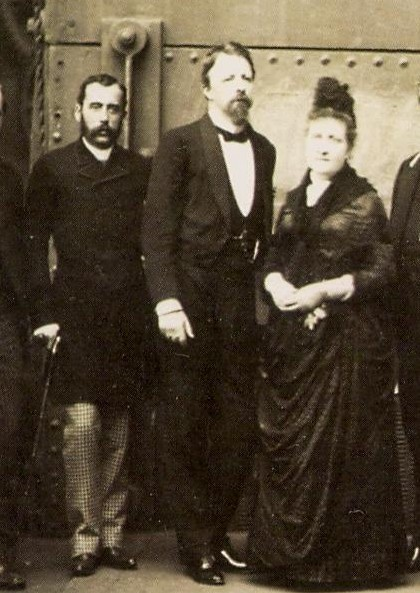
José Carlos de Carvalho, Gaston of Orléans and Isabel, imperial princess, visiting a plant dedicated to the manufacturing of military equipment, 1886.

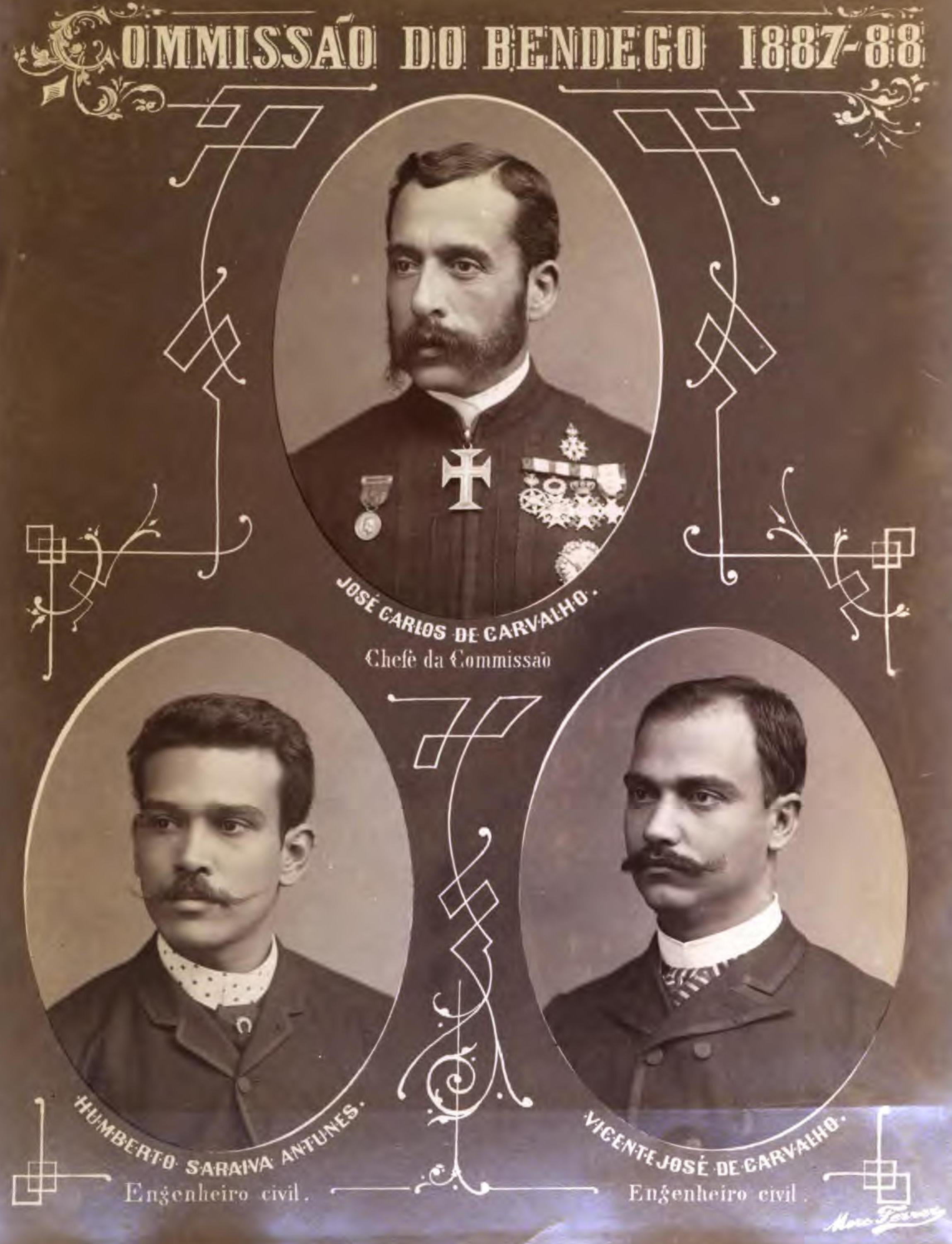
Report presented to the Ministry of Agriculture, Commerce and Public Works and to the Geographical Society of Rio de Janeiro on the displacement and transport of the Bendegó meteorite from the interior of the province of Bahia to the National Museum.

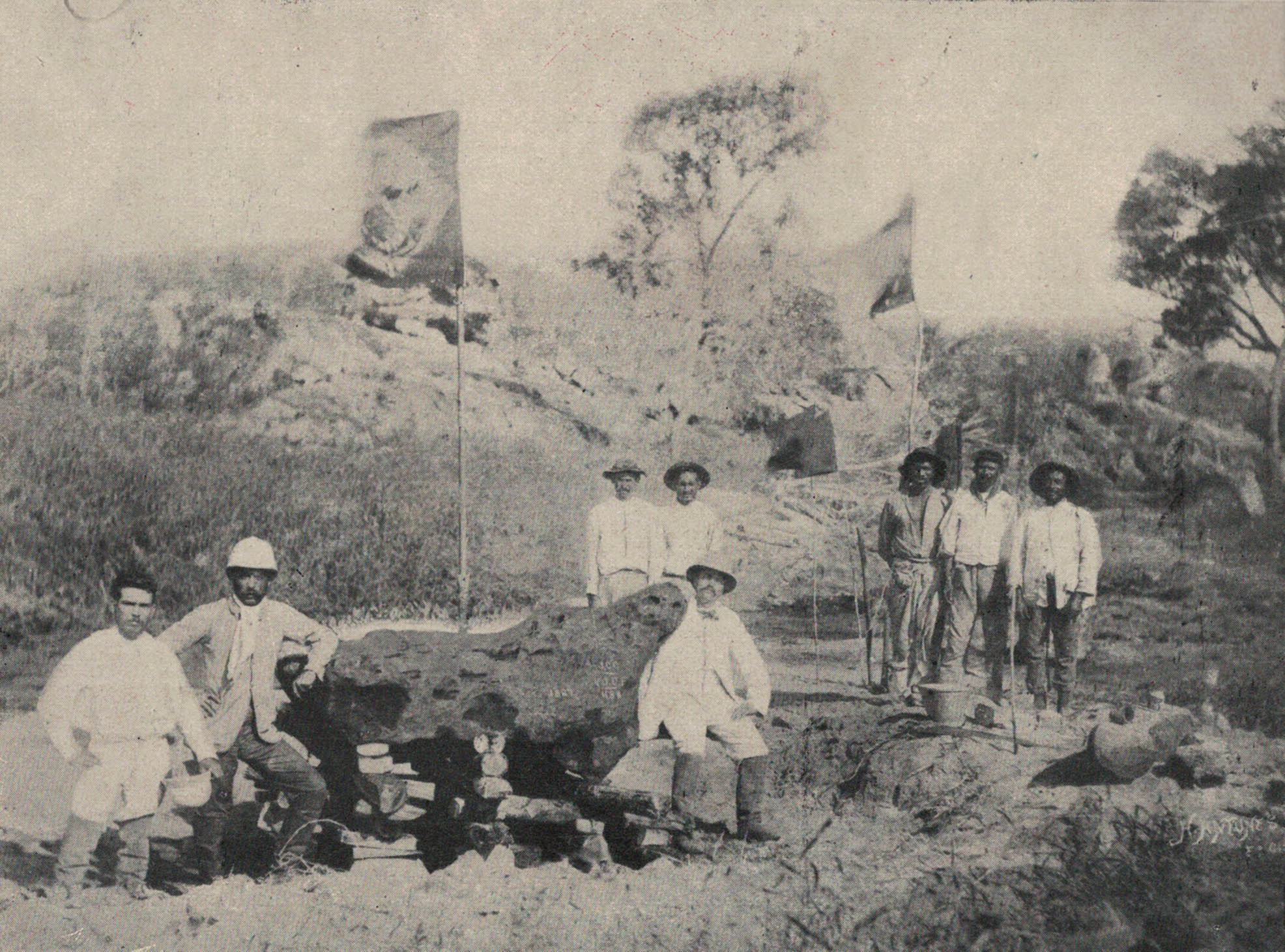
Bendegó meteorite in a photograph by H. Antunes, taken in 1887, showing the meteorite still on the bank of the Bendegó stream, with vice admiral José Carlos de Carvalho and engineers Humberto Saraiva Antunes and Vicente José de Carvalho.
