= 289 Nenetta =

A-type asteroid in the Asteroid belt

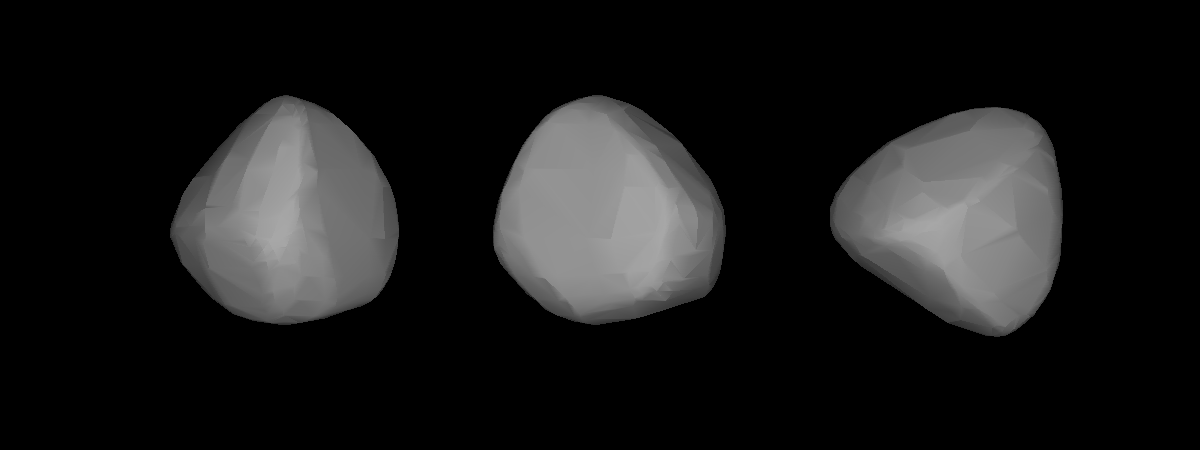
- Lightcurve-based 3D model of 289 Nenetta

Discovery
- Discovered by: Auguste Charlois
- Discovery date: 10 March 1890

Designations
- Minor planet category: Main belt

Orbital characteristics
- Epoch 31 July 2016 (JD 2457600.5)
- Uncertainty parameter 0
- Observation arc: 113.69 yr (41526 d)
- Aphelion: 3.46101 AU (517.760 Gm)
- Perihelion: 2.28661 AU (342.072 Gm)
- Semi-major axis: 2.87381 AU (429.916 Gm)
- Eccentricity: 0.20433
- Orbital period (sidereal): 4.87 yr (1,779.4 d)
- Mean anomaly: 104.307°
- Mean motion: 0° 12^{m} 8.316^{s} / day
- Inclination: 6.69535°
- Longitude of ascending node: 182.114°
- Argument of perihelion: 189.219°

Physical characteristics
- Dimensions: 37.586±1.002 km
- Synodic rotation period: 6.902 h (0.2876 d)
- Geometric albedo: 0.2438±0.042
- Absolute magnitude (H): 9.51

289 Nenetta is an A-type asteroid with a diameter of 38 km. The asteroid is orbiting the Sun at a distance of 2.87 AU with an eccentricity (ovalness) of 0.204 and an orbital period of 4.87 yr. The orbital plane is inclined at an angle of 6.7° to the plane of the ecliptic.

== Discovery ==
It was discovered by Auguste Charlois on 10 March 1890 in Nice, France.

== Physical characteristics ==
=== Rotation ===
Photometric observations taken in 2018 provided a light curve showing a synodic rotation period of 6.916±0.001 h for the asteroid with an amplitude of 0.20±0.02 in magnitude. This result is mostly consistent with previous measurements.

=== Surface and spectrum ===
The spectrum of 289 Nenetta reveals the strong presence of the mineral olivine, a relative rarity in the asteroid belt. Nenetta's spectrum is similar to those of the angrite meteorites.
