= Patos de Minas (meteorite) =

Meteorite found in Brazil

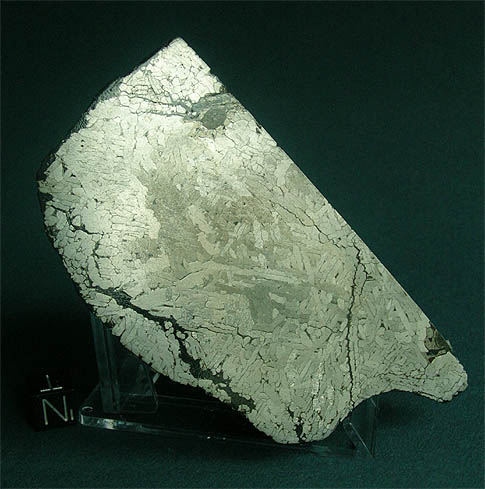
- Type: Octahedrite
- Class: Iron IAB
- Composition: Co, Ni, Ga, Cu, As, Ir and Au
- Country: Brazil
- Region: Minas Gerais
- Coordinates: 18°35′S 46°32′W
- Observed fall: No
- Found date: 1925 and 2002
- TKW: 218.4 kg
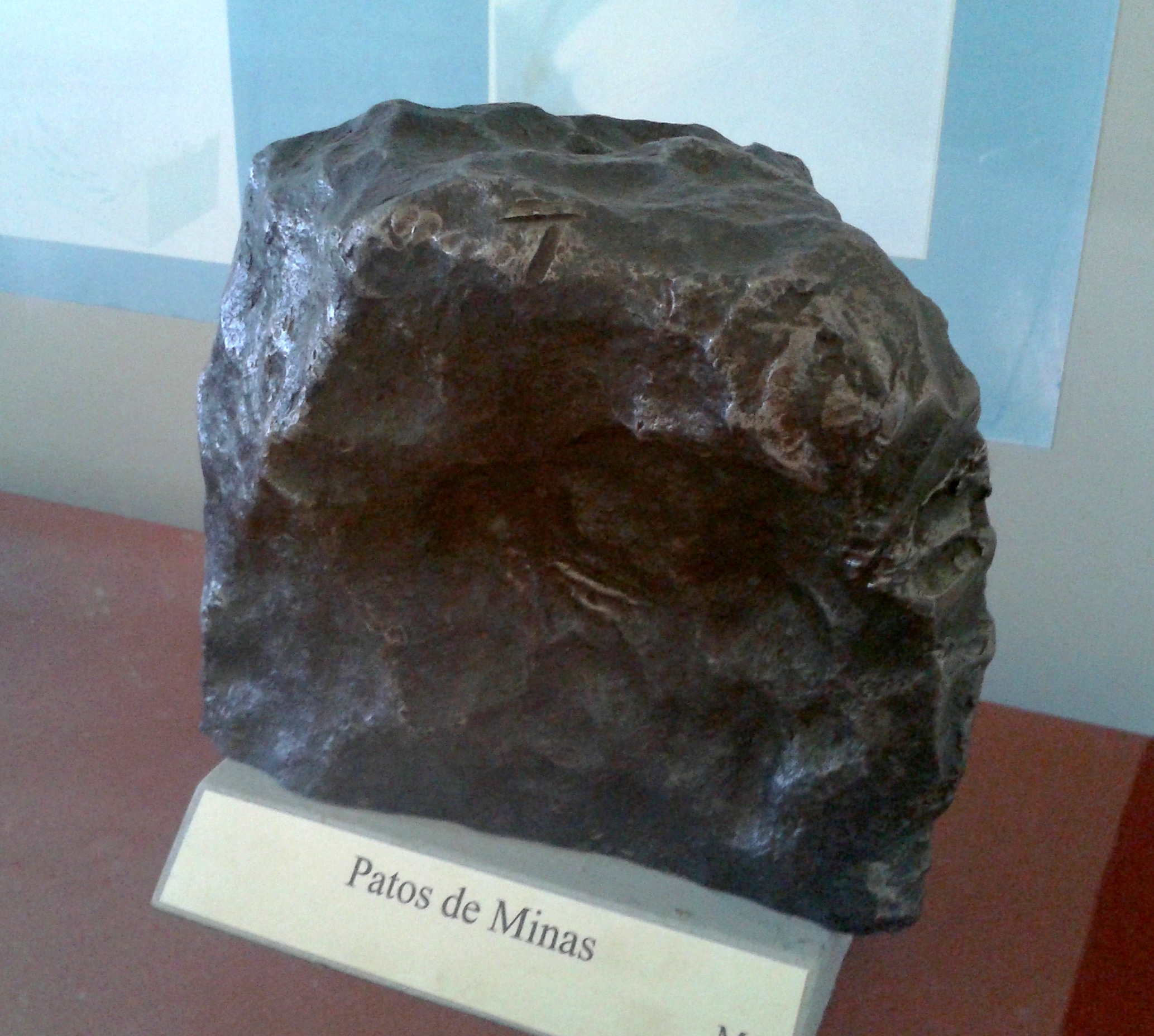
- Patos de Minas meteorite in the National Museum, Rio de Janeiro.
- Related media on Wikimedia Commons

Patos de Minas is an octahedrite meteorite. It was found in 1925 and 2002 in Patos de Minas, Minas Gerais, Brazil. It weighs 200 kilograms (440 lb) and has average dimensions of 54 by 33 by 22 centimetres (21.3 in × 13.0 in × 8.7 in). It is rough, elongated and very weathered.

== See also ==
- Collection of meteorites in the National Museum of Brazil
- Glossary of meteoritics
