= Avanhandava (meteorite) =

Meteorite

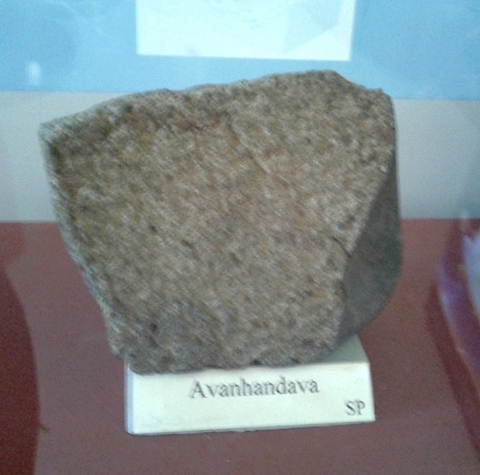
- Type: Chondrite
- Class: Ordinary chondrite
- Group: H4
- Country: Brazil
- Region: São Paulo
- Coordinates: 21°27′37″S 49°57′3″W
- Observed fall: Yes
- Fall date: 1952
- TKW: 9.33 kg
- Related media on Wikimedia Commons

Avanhandava is an H chondrite meteorite that fell to earth in 1952 in São Paulo, Brazil. It is classified as H4-ordinary chondrite. A total of 9.33 kilograms (20.6 lb) of this meteorite was collected after it broke up during its impact with the Earth.

== See also ==
- Collection of meteorites in the National Museum of Brazil
- Glossary of meteoritics
- Meteorite falls

== Bibliography ==
- Paar W. et al. 1976. Revista Brasileira de Geo-ciencias 6: 201–210.
- Kohout T. et al. 2004. Physics and Chemistry of the Earth 29: 885–897.
- Lee M. R. and Bland P. A. 2004. Geochimica et Cosmochimica Acta 68: 893–916.
- Terho M. et al. 1993. Studia Geopgysica et Geodaetica 37: 65–82.
