= Fassaite =

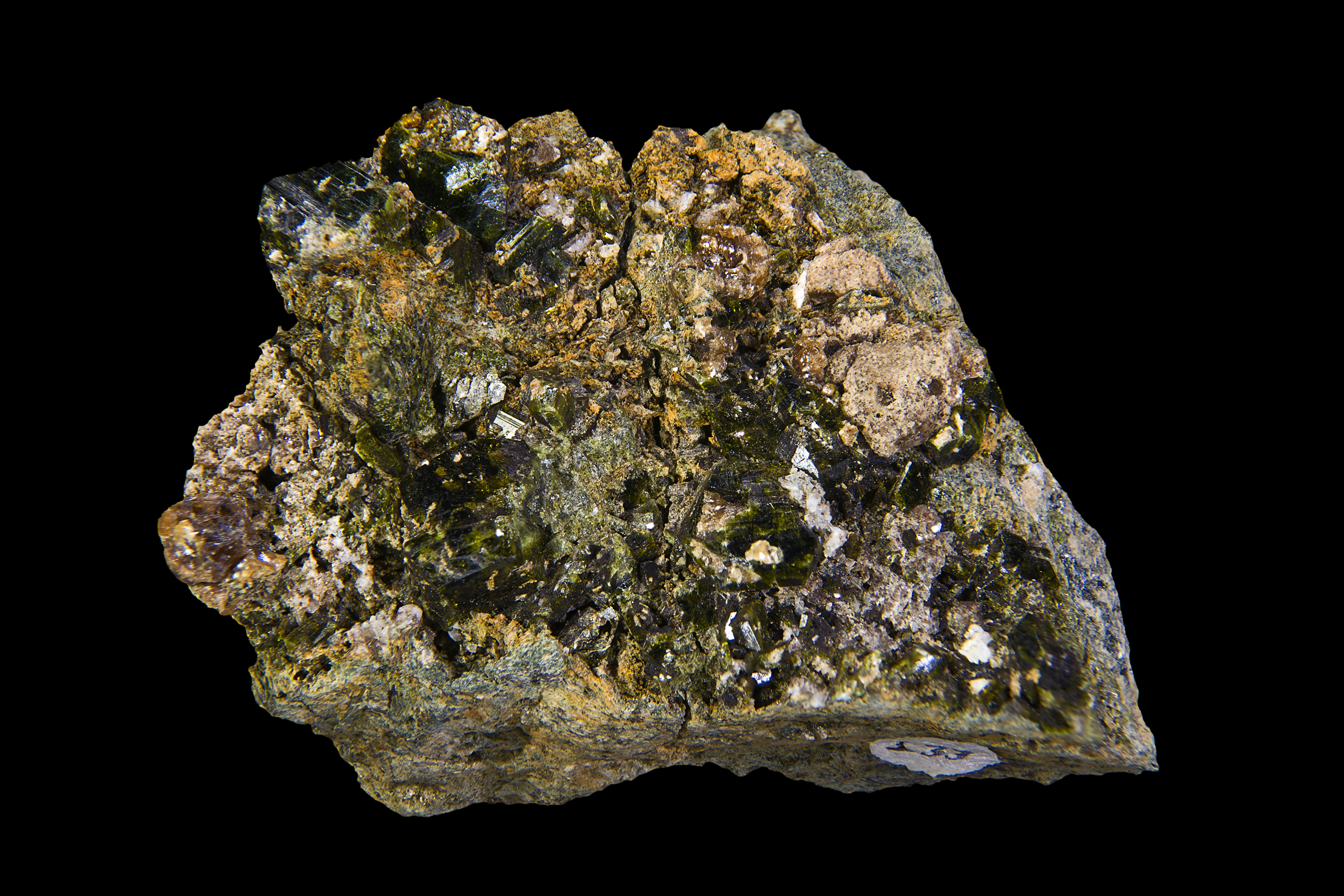
- Fassaite from Val di Fassa

General
- Category: Minerals
- Formula: Ca(Mg,Fe,Al)(Si,Al)_{2}O_{6}
- Crystal system: Monoclinic
- Crystal class: Prismatic (2/m) (same H-M symbol)
- Space group: C2/c (no. 15)

Identification
- Color: light-dark green, black
- Crystal habit: prismatic, short, plane
- Mohs scale hardness: 6
- Streak: greenish-white
- Specific gravity: 2.9-3.3

Fassaite is a variety of augite with a very low iron content, Ca(Mg,Fe,Al)(Si,Al)_{2}O_{6}. It is named after the Fassa Valley, Italy.

It is thought to be a contact mineral formed at high temperature on the interface between volcanic rocks and limestone. It is also reported in meteorites.
