= Bendegó meteorite =

Meteorite found in Brazil

Bendegó
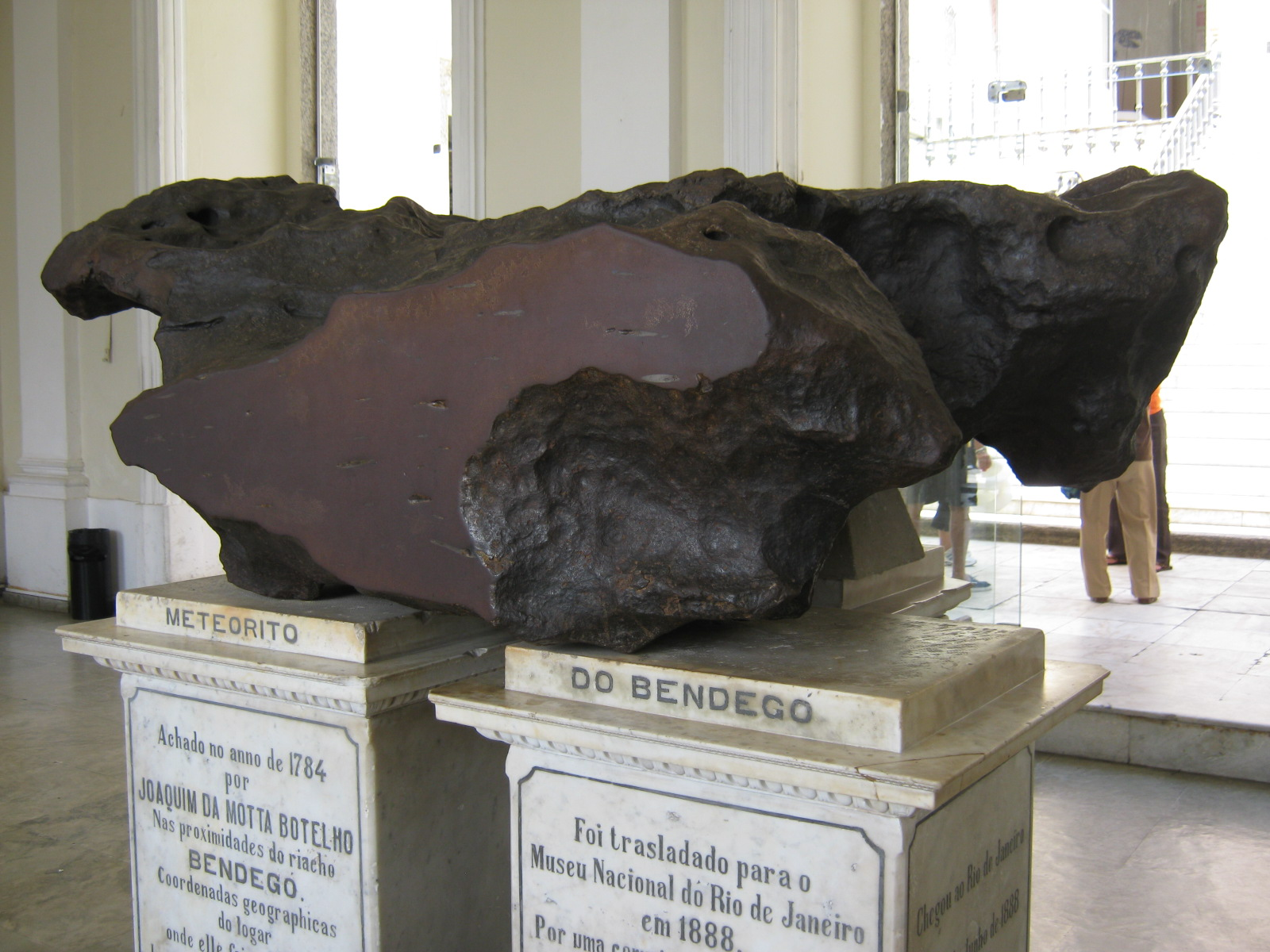
- Bendegó meteorite, front, National Museum, Rio de Janeiro
- Type: Iron
- Country: Brazil
- Region: Bahia
- Coordinates: 10°07′01″S 39°15′41″W
- Observed fall: No
- Alternative names: Bendengó
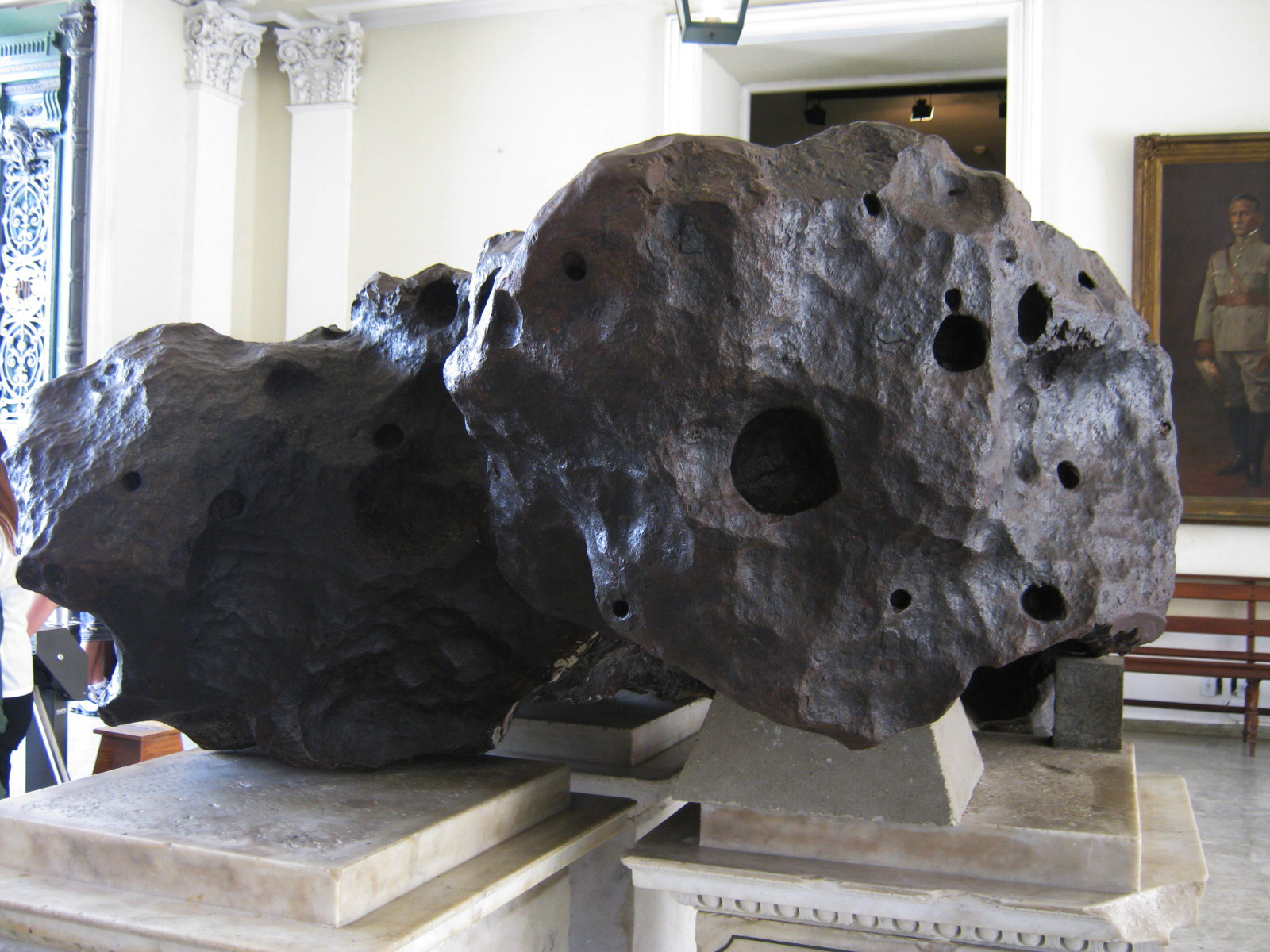
- Related media on Wikimedia Commons

The Bendegó Meteorite (also known as Pedra do Bendegó or simply Bendengó) is a meteorite found in the interior of the state of Bahia, Brazil. It is the largest iron meteorite ever found on Brazilian soil, weighing 5,360 kilograms (11,820 lb), measuring over 2 m (6.6 ft) in length. It has been on display at the National Museum of Brazil, in Rio de Janeiro, since 1888.

It survived the fire that destroyed the museum in 2018, sustaining no major damage.

== Discovery ==
The Bendegó meteorite was found in 1784 by the boy Domingos da Motta Botelho, who grazed cattle on a farm near the present town of Monte Santo, Bahia. At the time of its finding, it was the second largest meteorite in the world. Judging from the four-inch layer of oxidation upon which it rested, and the lost part of its lower portion, it is estimated that it had been in place for thousands of years.

=== Transport to Museum ===
News of the finding quickly spread. In 1785, governor D. Rodrigues Menezes arranged for it to be transported to Salvador, however, the meteorite's excessive weight made transportation difficult. The cart it was on ran out of control down a hill and the meteorite fell into a dry stream bed, 180 meters away from the spot where it was originally found. It remained there until 1888, when it was recovered and brought to the National Museum.

== First Research ==
In 1810 the stone was visited by the British mineralogist Aristides Franklin Mornay, who confirmed that it was a meteorite. With great difficulty he managed to remove some fragments, which were sent to the Royal Society of London, together with a description of personal observations, to be investigated by the scientist William Wollaston, who in 1816 published an article about the stone in the scientific journal Philosophical Transactions.

In 1820, German naturalists Spix and Martius went to see the meteorite, which was still found on the remains of the cart with which it had fallen down the hill in 1785. After setting fire to the stone for more than 24 hours, they managed to remove some fragments that were taken to Europe, the largest of which was donated to the Munich Museum.

== Description and composition ==
The meteorite is an irregular mass, 2.20 m × 1.45 m × 0.58 m (7.2 ft × 4.8 ft × 1.9 ft) reminding, in appearance, an asteroid. It has numerous depressions on the surface and cylindrical holes oriented parallel to its greater length. These holes were formed by the burning of the troilite, during the transatmospheric passage of the meteorite, since the sulfide has a lower melting point than the rest of the meteorite, consuming more quickly. It is a metallic meteorite, consisting basically of iron, with the following elements: 6.6% Ni, 0.47% Co, 0.22% P, and traces of S and C in much smaller quantities, only measured in parts per million.

The meteorite has characteristic Widmanstätten pattern iron/nickel crystals as will as inclusions containing phosphorus and sulfur.

== See also ==
- Collection of meteorites in the National Museum of Brazil
- Glossary of meteoritics
- List of largest meteorites on Earth
- Bendegó meteorite (report)
