= Collection of meteorites in the National Museum of Brazil =

Meteorite collection in Brazil

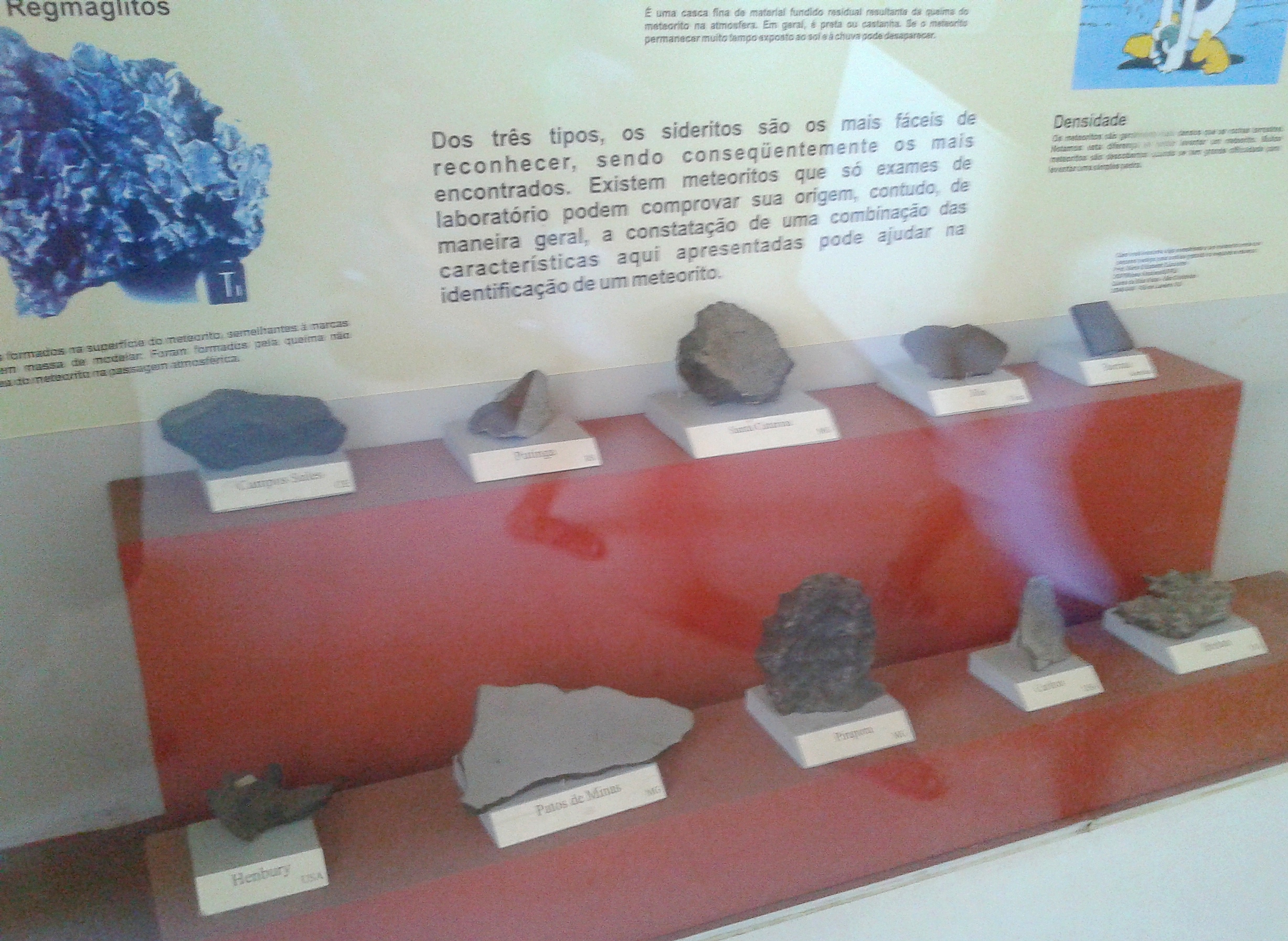
Exhibition of meteorites in the museum.

The National Museum of Brazil collections include an exhibition of meteorites discovered in Brazil and other countries.

One of the most important meteorites that was on display is the Bendegó meteorite, which weighs over 5,000 kg and was discovered in 1784. It survived the fire that destroyed the museum in 2018, sustaining no major damage.

Image	Name	Type	Find location	Year	TKW	Notes
	Avanhandava	Chondrite	Avanhandava, São Paulo, Brazil	1952	9.33 kg (20.6 lb)	Mostly composed of iron (27.15%) and olivine (17.3%).
	Bendegó	Iron meteorite	Bahia, Brazil	1784	5,360 kg (11,820 lb)	It is the biggest iron meteorite ever found in Brazilian soil.
	Brenham	Pallasite	Kansas, United States	1882	4,300 kg (9,500 lb)	
	Campos Sales	Chondrite	Ceará, Brazil	1991	23.68 kg (52.2 lb)	
	Carlton	Siderite	Hamilton County, Texas, United States	1887	81.2 kg (179 lb)	
	Glen Rose	Iron	Glen Rose, Texas, United States	1934	11 kg (24 lb)	
	Henbury	Siderite	Australia	1922	2,000 kg (4,400 lb)	
	Krasnojarsk	Pallasite	Russia	1749	700 kg (1,500 lb)	
	Pará de Minas	Siderite	Minas Gerais, Brazil	1934	112 kg (247 lb)	
	Patos de Minas	Octahedrite	Minas Gerais, Brazil	1925	218.4 kg (481 lb)	Composed of iron and nickel.
	Pirapora	Siderite	Minas Gerais, Brazil	1888	6.18 kg (13.6 lb)	Composed of iron and nickel.
	Santa Catharina	Siderite	Santa Catarina, Brazil	1875	7,000 kg (15,000 lb)	
	São João Nepomuceno	Siderite	São João Nepomuceno, Brazil	1960	15.3 kg (34 lb)	

== See also ==
- National Museum of Brazil
