= Angrite =

Rare group of achondrite meteorites

- — Group —
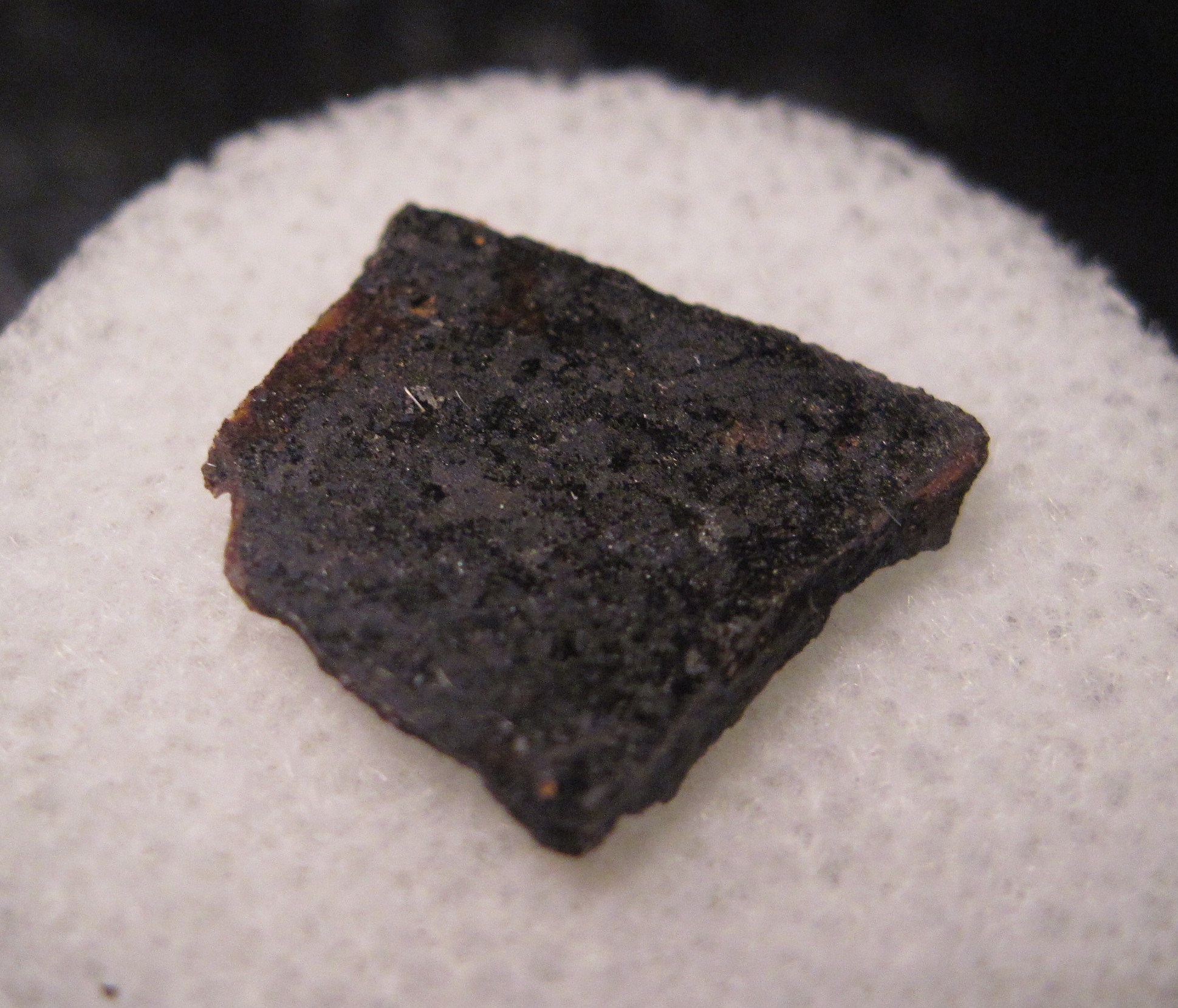
- A slice of NWA 2999. Note the similarity to a terrestrial basalt.
- Compositional type: Stony meteorite
- Type: Achondrite
- Subgroups: Quenched Plutonic
- Parent body: Possibly 289 Nenetta, 3819 Robinson or Mercury
- Total known specimens: 30+

Angrites are a rare group of achondrites consisting mostly of Al-Ti bearing diopside, hedenbergite, olivine, anorthite and troilite with minor traces of phosphate and metals. The group is named for the Angra dos Reis meteorite. They are the oldest igneous rocks, with crystallization ages of around 4.56 billion years. Angrites are subdivided into two main groups, the quenched and plutonic angrites. The quenched angrites cooled rapidly upon the surface of the angrite parent body (APB), whereas the plutonic angrites cooled more slowly, deeper in the crust. The parent body is thought to have been at least as large as Earth's moon.

== Origin ==
Angrite meteorites are distinct from other meteoritic groups based on their oxygen isotopic compositions. Based on their Mn-Fe ratios in pyroxene and other isotopic compositions, the source of angrites is constrained to the inner Solar System, with the possibility of some mixing from elsewhere.

The reflectance spectra of the angrites connects them to two main belt asteroids, 289 Nenetta and 3819 Robinson, suggesting that they may be fragments of the parent body.

The chemistry of angrites indicates that they originate in a differentiated planetary body. Ejecta from Mercury has been suggested as a possibility. A study in 2026 found minerals that had formed at pressures of at least 1.75 GPa (17.5 kilobars) at relatively shallow depths (that is, that these pressures were achieved in the mantle rather than the core), indicating that the parent body was as large or larger than Earth's moon. Compare this number with Ceres, where the core pressure is under 0.2 GPa, Vesta, where it is under 0.4 GPa. and Pluto, where it is perhaps 1 GPa.

== Notable meteorites ==
There are currently over 30 meteorites classified as angrites. The type specimen, the Angra dos Reis meteorite, was an observed fall in 1869 and weighed 1.5 kilograms (3.3 lb). Most of it has been lost over time; the largest remaining piece, weighing 101 grams, is kept at the Museum of Natural History in Rio de Janeiro.

NWA 10463 has been suggested to be an intermediate stage between the quenched and plutonic angrite meteorites.

NWA 8535 has been suggested to be a Dunite.

Asuka-12209; Asuka-88371 and NWA 12320 demonstrate an oxygen isotopic disequilibrium indicative of planetary mixing.

== See also ==
- Glossary of meteoritics
