= National Museum of Brazil fire =

2018 museum fire at Rio de Janeiro

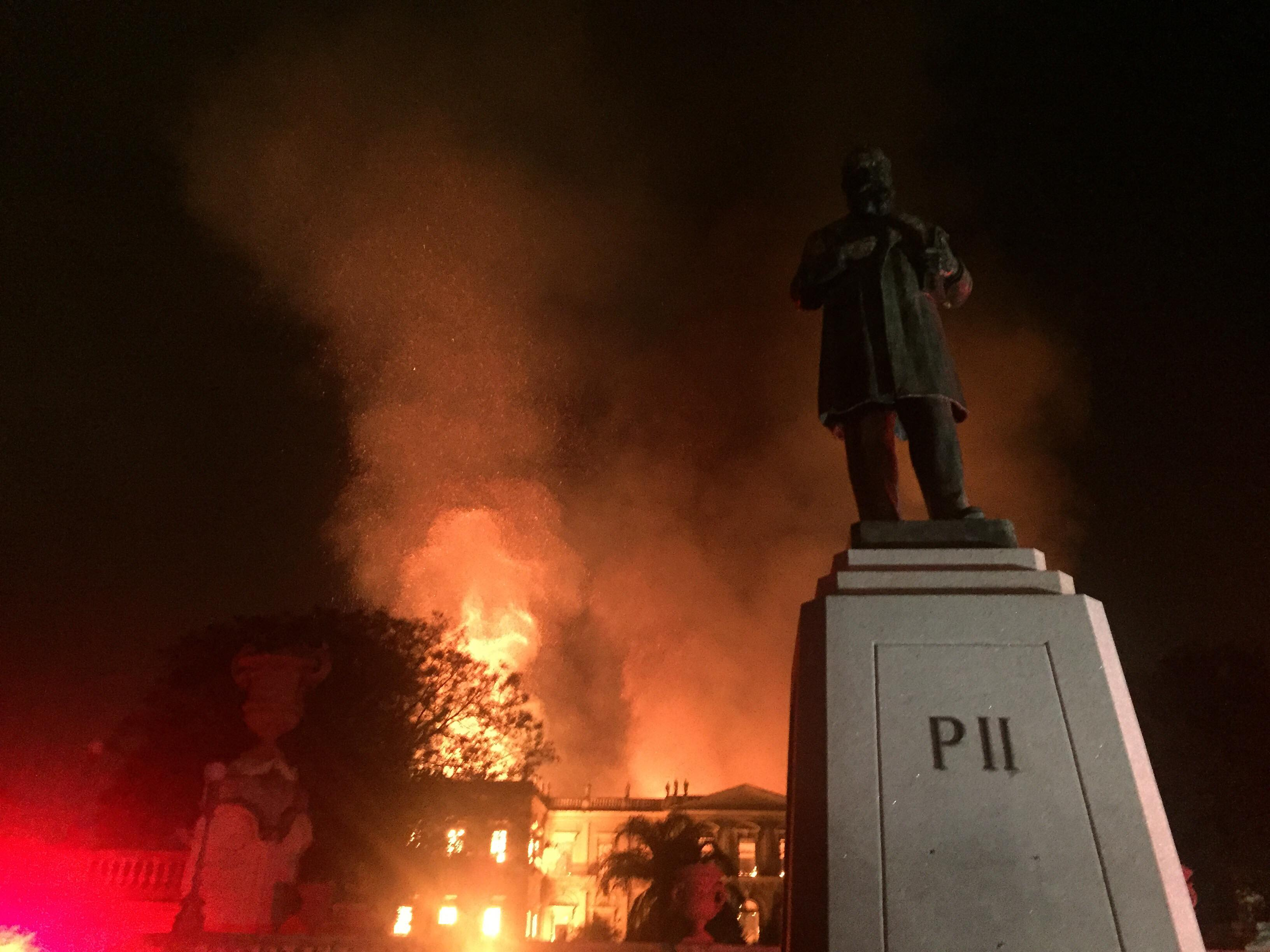
- The National Museum building burning behind the statue of Emperor Pedro II
- Native name: Incêndio no Museu Nacional
- Date: 2 September 2018 (8 years)
- Time: 23:30 UTC
- Duration: 6 hours
- Location: Rio de Janeiro, Rio de Janeiro, Brazil
- Type: Conflagration
- Cause: Overheating of air conditioning caused by short circuit.
- Outcome: Approximately 18.5 million (92.5 %) of the museum's 20 million items were destroyed.
- Deaths: 0
- Injuries: 1 (a firefighter suffered burns to his fingers trying to save the skull of Luzia)
- Property damage: Paço de São Cristóvão

The National Museum of Brazil was heavily damaged by a large fire which began about 19:30 local time (23:30 UTC) on 2 September 2018. Although some items were saved, it is believed that 92% of its archive of 20 million items was destroyed in the fire. The small number of unscathed items were stored in a separate building which was not damaged.

The fire is believed to have started from a malfunctioning air conditioner, and was exacerbated by years of neglect to the building and surrounding infrastructure. First responders fighting the fire were hindered by a lack of water. Rio's fire chief said two nearby fire hydrants had insufficient water, leaving firefighters to resort to pumping water from a nearby lake. According to a CEDAE (Rio de Janeiro's Water and Sewerage State Company) employee, although the hydrants did have water, the water pressure was very low because the building is on top of a hill, making them unusable. Brazilian president Michel Temer said that the loss due to the fire was "incalculable."

== Background ==
Museum Deputy Director Luiz Fernando Dias Daniel pointed to neglect by successive governments as a cause of the fire, saying that curators "fought with different governments to get adequate resources to preserve what is now completely destroyed" and that he felt "total dismay and immense anger." The museum lacked a fire sprinkler system, although there were smoke detectors and a few fire extinguishers. The museum did not receive the R$520,000 per year necessary for its maintenance since 2014, and it closed temporarily in 2015 when cleaning and security staff could no longer be paid. Repairs to a popular exhibit hall had to be crowd-funded, and the museum's maintenance budget had been cut by 90 percent by 2018. There were visible signs of decay before the fire, such as peeling walls and exposed wiring. The museum celebrated its 200th anniversary in June 2018 in a situation of partial abandonment. No state ministers attended the occasion.

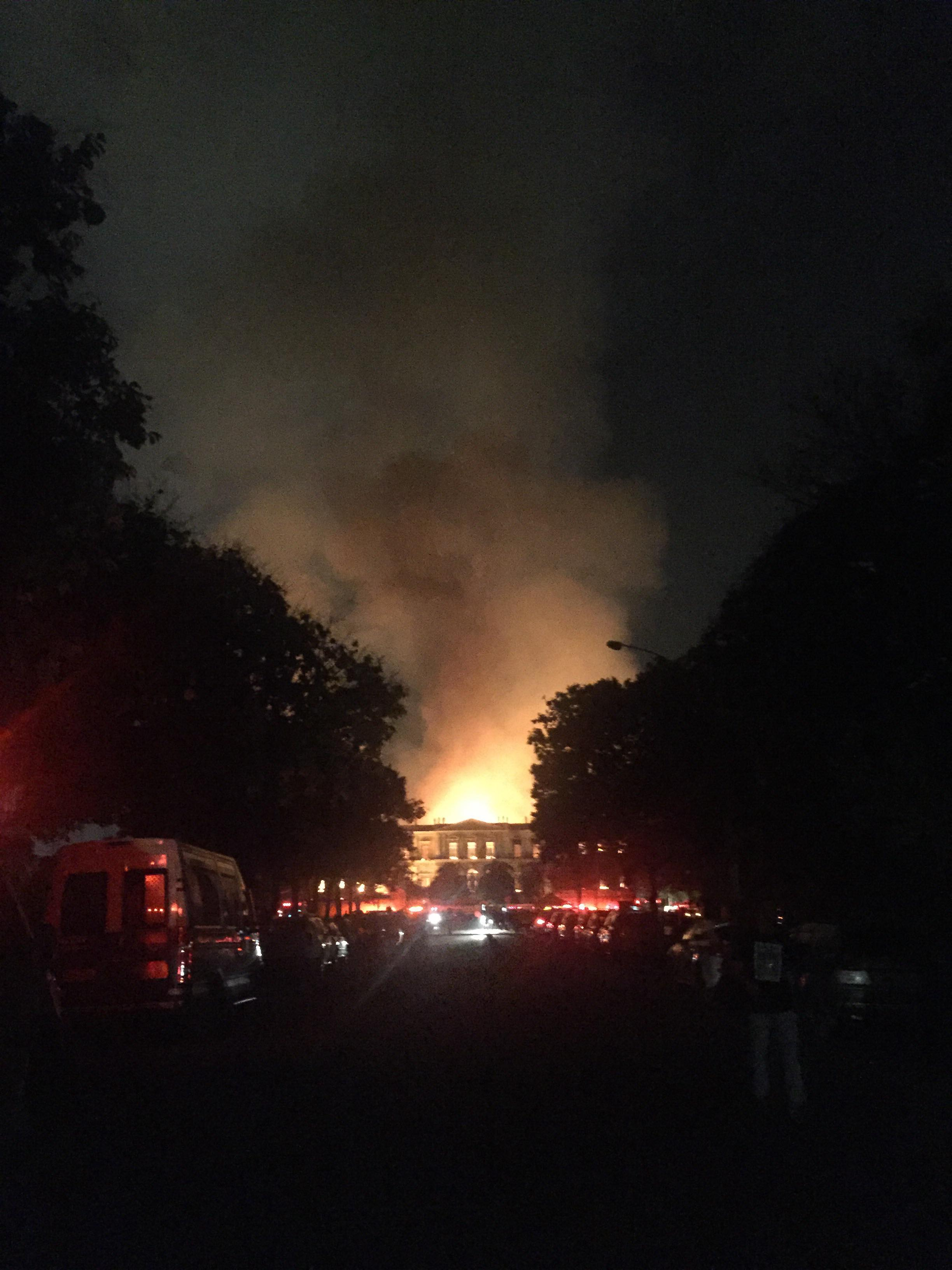

== Fire ==
A large fire broke out shortly after the museum closed on 2 September 2018, reaching all three floors of the building. Firefighters were called at 19:30 local time (22:30 UTC) and arrived quickly at the scene. However, the fire chief reported that the two fire hydrants closest to the museum had no water, and trucks had to be sent to a nearby lake. According to the spokesman for the fire department, the fire crews went inside the burning building to rescue artifacts, despite there being no people inside, and they were able to remove items with the help of museum staff.

The fire was out of control by 21:00 (00:00 UTC 3 September), with great flames and occasional explosions. In total, 81 firefighters and 21 fire engines were involved. Dozens of people went to Quinta da Boa Vista to see the fire. A specialized team of firefighters entered the building at 21:15 to block areas still not hit by the flames and to evaluate the extent of the damage. However, by 21:30, the whole building had been engulfed by the fire, including exhibitions of Imperial rooms that were in the two areas at the front of the main building. The four security guards who were on duty at the museum managed to escape; first reports stated that there were no casualties, although a firefighter suffered burns to the fingers while trying to rescue the Luzia's fossil.

Two fire engines with turntable ladders were used, with two water trucks taking turns supplying water. The Brazilian Marine Corps also provided fire engines, water trucks, and a decontamination unit from a nearby base. Pictures on social media showed artifacts being rescued from the burning building by firefighters and civilians.

At 22:00 (01:00 UTC 3 September), dozens of museum employees joined the fight against the flames. Two floors of the building were already destroyed by this time, and the roof had collapsed. Brazilian Culture Minister Sérgio Sá Leitão suggested that it was probably caused by either an electric fault or by a sky lantern accidentally landing on the building.

== Damage to collection ==
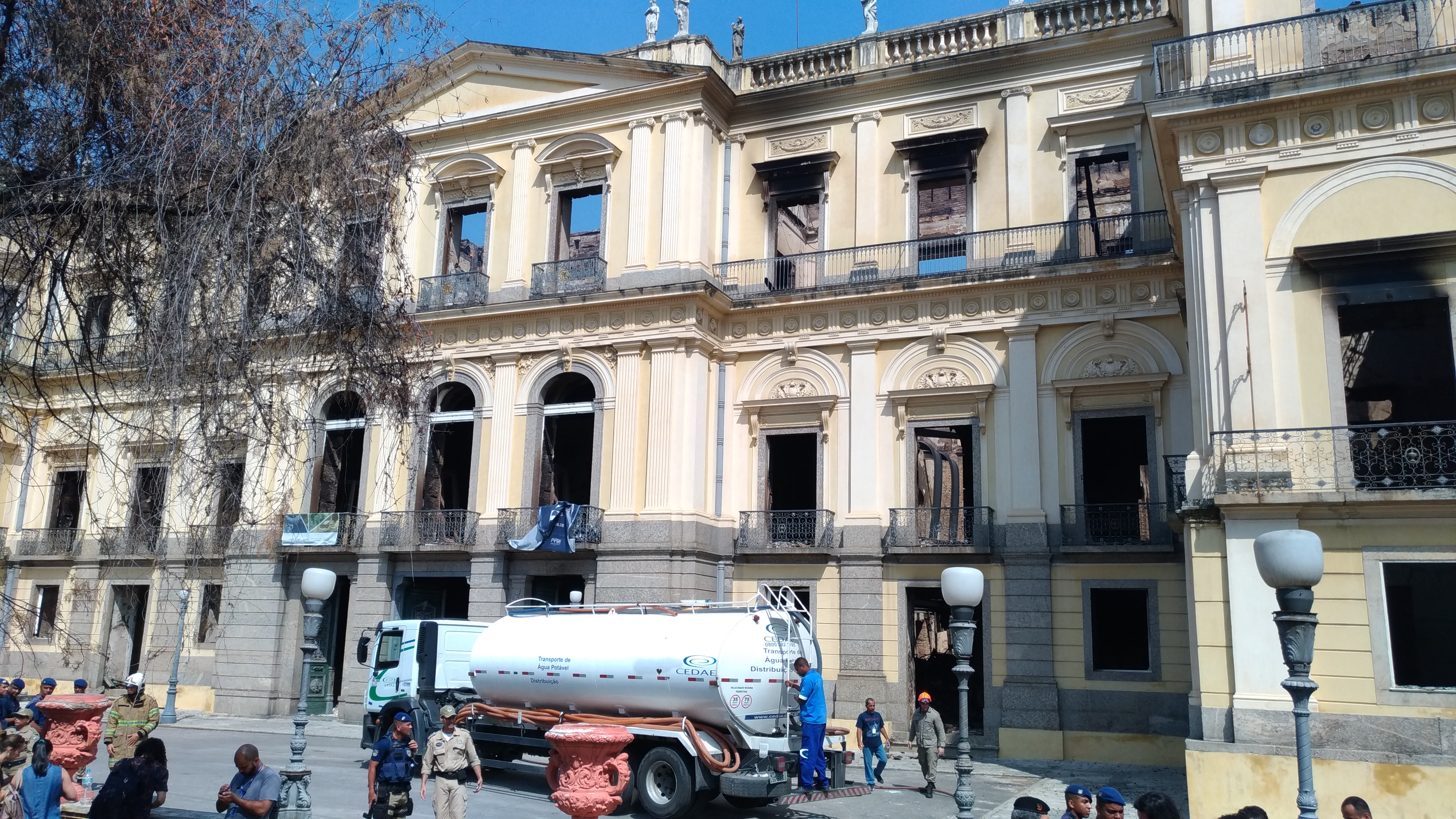
Paço de São Cristóvão following the fire

A building area of 13,600 square metres (146,000 sq ft) with 122 rooms was destroyed. The building had been opened in 1803 with Luso-Lebanese Elie Antun Lubbus. According to museum officials, approximately 92.5 percent of the collection has been destroyed. The building was uninsured.

A spokesman for the fire department reported that pieces had been recovered from the blaze through efforts of firefighters and workers from the museum. Information about the condition of pieces that were displayed started being reported as early as late 2 September, when the images of items were shared. One of these was a Roman fresco from Pompeii that had survived the eruption of Vesuvius but was lost in the fire.

Preservation director of the museum João Carlos Nara told reporters that "very little will be left" and that they would "have to wait until the firefighters have completed their work here in order to really assess the scale of it all." The next day, firefighters began more salvage work inside the museum, trying to rescue what they could from beneath the charred remains of the collapsed roof.

The collection relating to indigenous languages is believed to have been completely destroyed, including recordings since 1958, chants in extinct languages, the Curt Nimuendajú archives (papers, photos, negatives, the original ethnic-historic-linguistic map localizing all the ethnic groups in Brazil, the only extant record from 1945), and the ethnological and archaeological references of all ethnic groups in Brazil since the 16th century. One of the linguistic researchers, Bruna Franchetto, who returned only to see her office as a pile of ash, criticised the fact that a project to back up the collection digitally had only just received funding and barely started, asking for any student who had ever come to the museum to scan or photocopy things for projects to send a copy back.

The fire destroyed the museum's collection of thousands of indigenous artifacts from the country's pre-Columbian Indo-American culture. The items include many indigenous peoples' remains as well as relics amassed in the personal collection of Pedro II. This collection also featured items from extant native tribes, including "striking feather art by the Karajá people". There are only about 3,000 Karajá people left.

Indigenous people expressed anger that there was no money given to a museum with indigenous history but "the city had recently managed to find a huge budget to build a brand new Museum of Tomorrow". Cira Gonda also confirmed shortly after the fire that the indigenous linguistics collected had been completely destroyed, and so that original recordings of spoken word and song in dead languages have been lost, as well as other artifacts including those detailing the land and language distribution of tribes in Brazil.

== Surviving items ==
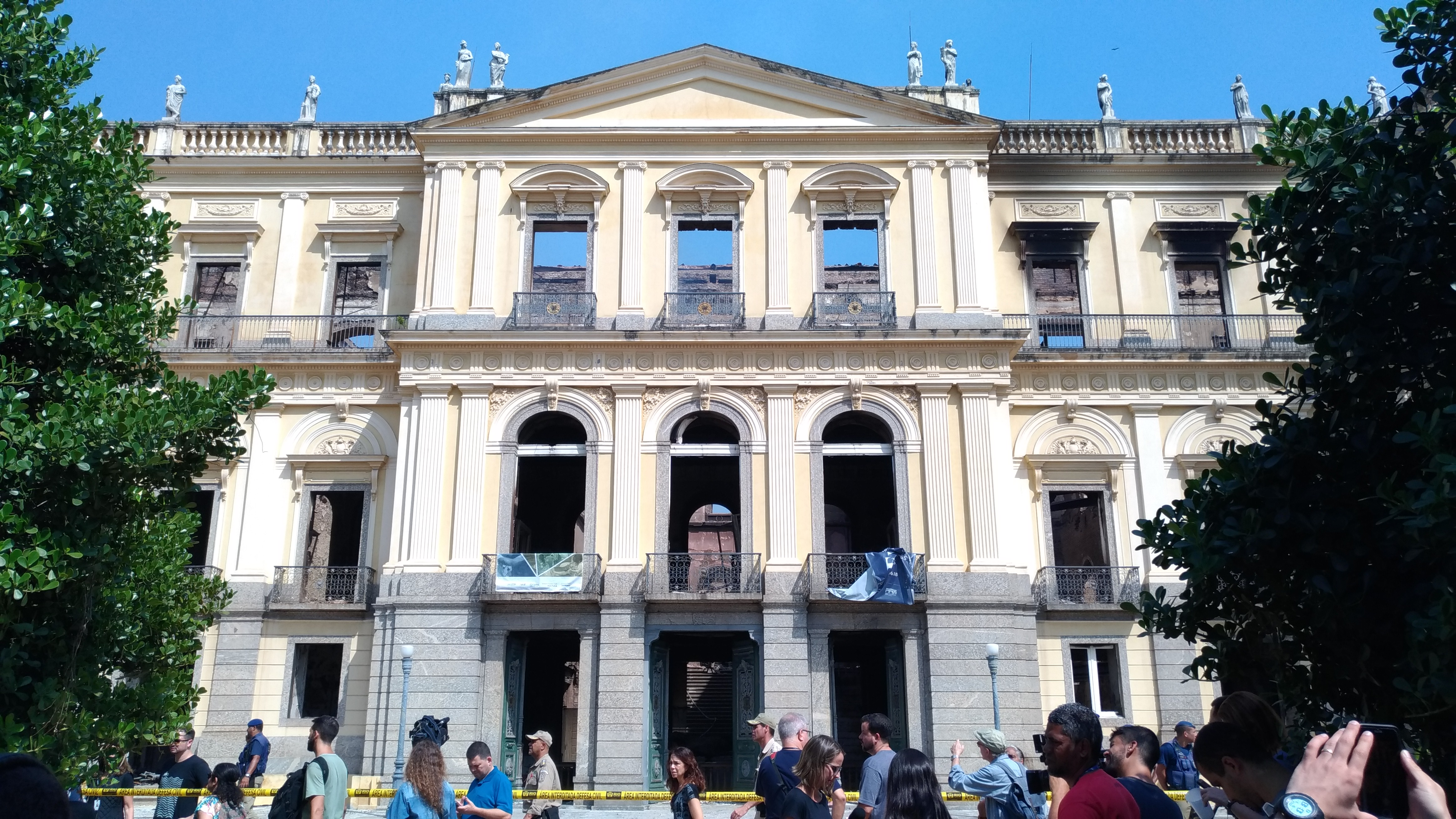
The burned facade

Some items survived the fire. The Bendegó meteorite from the museum's collection of meteorites, which is the biggest iron meteorite ever found in Brazil, was unscathed, due to its inherent fire-resistance. From images and video of salvage after the fire, at least three other meteorites also survived undamaged. Another meteorite called Angra dos Reis was rediscovered among the debris. The meteorite is worth R$ 3 million and was lost in the rubble of the National Museum. With a mass 76 thousand times smaller than that of Bendegó at a mere 65 grams, and with a length of 4 cm, the Angra dos Reis is the most valuable of the collection and was already the object of meteorite hunters. In more than a century of research, this fragment was divided into small portions. The biggest one was buried in the rubble of the museum. Some meteorites were found on 19 October 2018, including the Angra dos Reais, though that meteorite was burnt.

In the days following the fire, firefighters recovered several portraits from the upper floor of the museum, which had been burnt, smoke and water damaged but not destroyed. Cristiana Serejo, deputy director of the museum, also said that "part of the zoological collection, the library and some ceramics" had survived. Images were shared of research microscopes, freezers, and specimen jars being collected outside of the building by museum staff during the fire, next to a rusted hydrant. During the fire, part of the Zoology department pulled out mollusks and other marine specimens, and only stopped due to the imminent danger the fire posed. The fire did not reach an annex of the site where vertebrate specimens were kept, but due to a loss of electricity parts of the collection could become damaged.

During the salvage, an intact skull that appeared to be that of Luzia Woman was found, and sent to a nearby scientific laboratory for analysis. Other skulls and fragments of bones were discovered in the remains of the building, prompting a need for lab testing on the found items. On 19 October 2018, it was announced that the skull was confirmed to be from Luzia; many fragments, 80% of which were identified as being part of the frontal (forehead and nose), side, bones, and the fragment of a femur, were subsequently stored, though the assembly of them was postponed. A part of the box where Luiza's skull was stored was also recovered. The bones became white, because the earth along them were burned.

A portion of the museum's collection, specifically the herbarium, and fish and reptile species, was housed elsewhere and was unaffected. There was also a large scientific library within the museum, containing thousands of rare works. People on social media were reported to have found burnt pages from the library in the nearby streets; it was later confirmed that the library proper was housed in an adjacent building and was mostly undamaged. Some burnt pages, of unknown origin, were recovered by security guards. Nine Torah scrolls from the 15th century had previously been on display but were in the library at the time and survived.

== Reactions ==
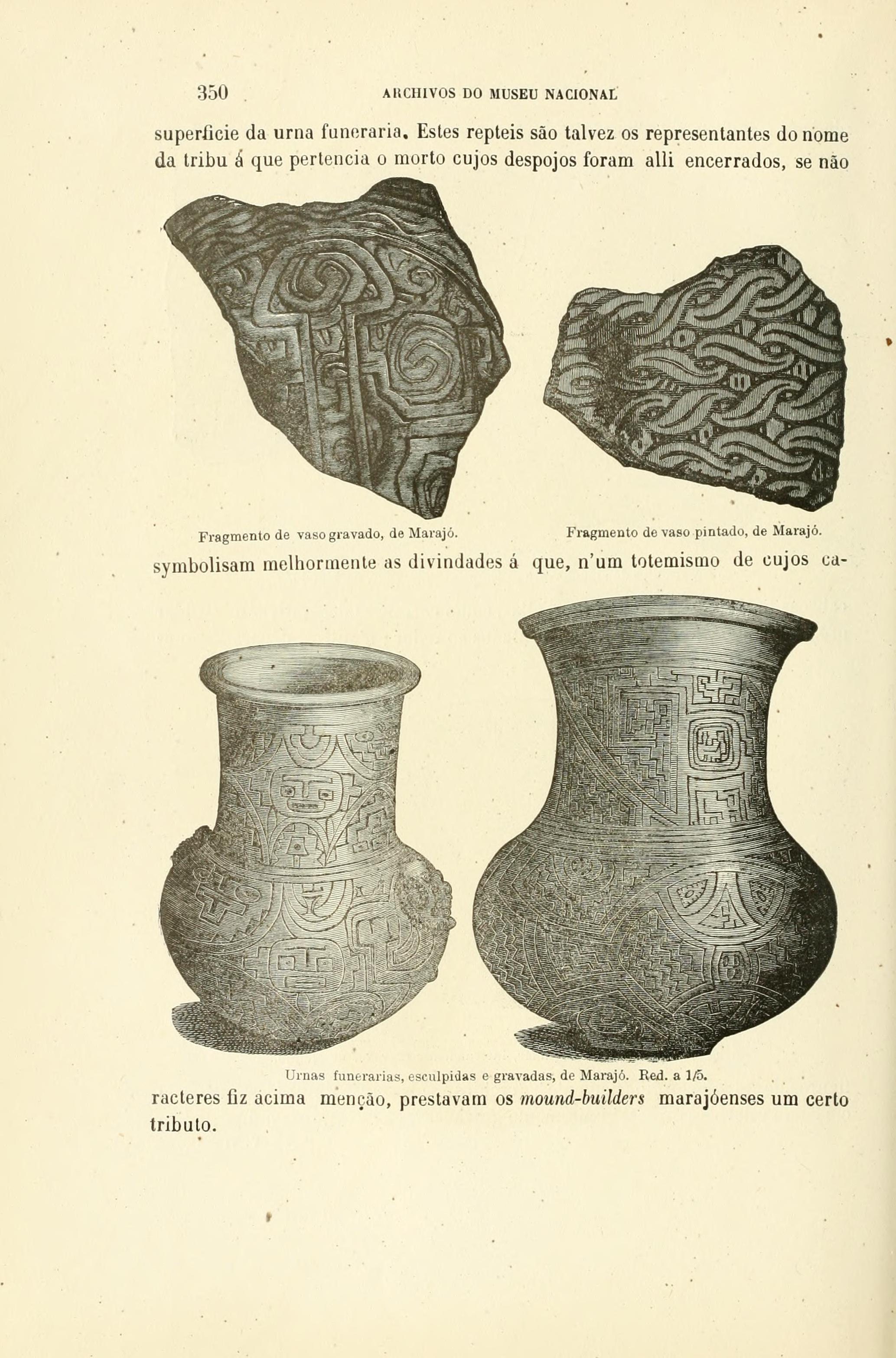
Funerary vases were destroyed in the fire

Brazil's president, Michel Temer, said that "the loss of the National Museum is incalculable for Brazil. Today is a tragic day for our country's museology. Two hundred years of work, research and knowledge were lost. The value of our history cannot be measured now, due to the damage to the building that housed the Royal Family during the Empire. It is a sad day for all Brazilians." His statement was echoed by Rio Mayor Marcelo Crivella, who called for rebuilding stating: "It's a national obligation to reconstruct it from the ashes, recompose every detail of the paintings and photos. Even if they are not original, they will continue to be a reminder of the royal family that gave us independence, the empire and the first constitution and national unity".

The archaeologist Zahi Hawass says that the tragedy legitimizes the movement for the repatriation of Egyptian objects in museums around the world and that if museums are not able to guarantee the safety and conservation of the objects, the archaeologist argues that to be returned to the native land. Although the collection of the National Museum was not targeted by Egyptian archaeologists, Hawass says that the destruction of the collection strengthens the movement for the repatriation of objects and that UNESCO observes countries with overseas collections and overseas museums to control them, to ensure that objects are properly protected and restored.

French President Emmanuel Macron expressed his condolences on Twitter at the event. He offered to send experts to help rebuild the museum.

Brazilian environmentalist and politician Marina Silva called the fire "a lobotomy of the Brazilian memory".

News of the fire quickly spread through the city of Rio de Janeiro, and protesters turned up at the gates in the early hours of Monday morning. Initial reports suggested that there were 500 people, forming a chain around the still-smoking building. Some of the protesters tried to climb over fencing into the museum grounds; the police who were called to attend, in full riot gear, threw tear gas bombs into the crowds. The public were later allowed to enter the grounds.

A group of Museum Studies students from the Federal University of the State of Rio de Janeiro called for the public to send in any photographs or videos of the destroyed collections. Their appeal received 14,000 videos, photos, and drawings of the museum's exhibitions within hours.

=== Cultural institutions ===
The president of the National Institute of Historic and Artistic Heritage, Kátia Bogéa, said that "It's a national and worldwide tragedy. Everybody can see that this is not a loss for the Brazilian people, but for the whole humanity" and commented that it was "a predictable tragedy, because we've known for a long time that Brazilian cultural heritage has no budget".

Museums around the world sent their condolences. In the UK, the British Library said "our hearts go out to the staff and users of [the National Museum] of Brazil" and called the fire "a reminder of the fragility and preciousness of our shared global heritage"; London's Natural History Museum, the Oxford University Museum of Natural History, and the Smithsonian Institution were among other institutions expressing their sorrow. The head of the Australian Museum said that she was "shocked", "devastated", and "distraught". Egypt's Supreme Council of Antiquities expressed both solidarity with the museum and concern over the status of more than 700 ancient Egyptian artifacts that were housed in the building. It offered to send experts, if requested by the Brazilian government, to assist the National Museum in restoring the damaged pieces.

== Salvage efforts ==
The team that began to focus on rescuing the collection met on September 9, 2018. There were 11 civil servants who, among other things, elaborated the preliminary protocol of actions and had the support of several institutions such as IBRAM, IPHAM, ICOM, UNESCO, etc.

One of those involved, Silvia Reis, said that the process was "guided by a forensic perspective", where they tried to understand what they found and carefully collected everything in a contextualized way. For pictures of the process, see Carvalho, Cardoso & Reis 2021, pp. 31–33. For a summary of the rest of the process, see Carvalho, Cardoso & Reis 2021, pp. 34–43.

On 12 September 2018, work began to implement a plan to temporarily shelter and work with what is currently the ruins of the museum:

- Wooden structures, including a metallic wall, completely surrounding the São Cristovão Palace to protect what remains of the building,
- Containment measures for the building to avoid risk of landslide,
- An improvised roof to protect against rainwater,
- Modules and containers outside to serve as temporary research laboratory space.

For this plan, the Brazilian government offered R$9 million as an emergency budget which has since been received by the museum. The company, Concrejato, is contracted to reinstall the walls of the building at a cost of R$8,998,075.66. and Unesco says that the reconstruction would take 10 years to get ready. Researchers are recreating 300 parts of the collection of the National Museum, including the skull of Luzia, with 3D printers. The studies are being resumed in a laboratory of the National Institute of Technology (INT), by master's and doctoral students of the Federal University of Rio de Janeiro.

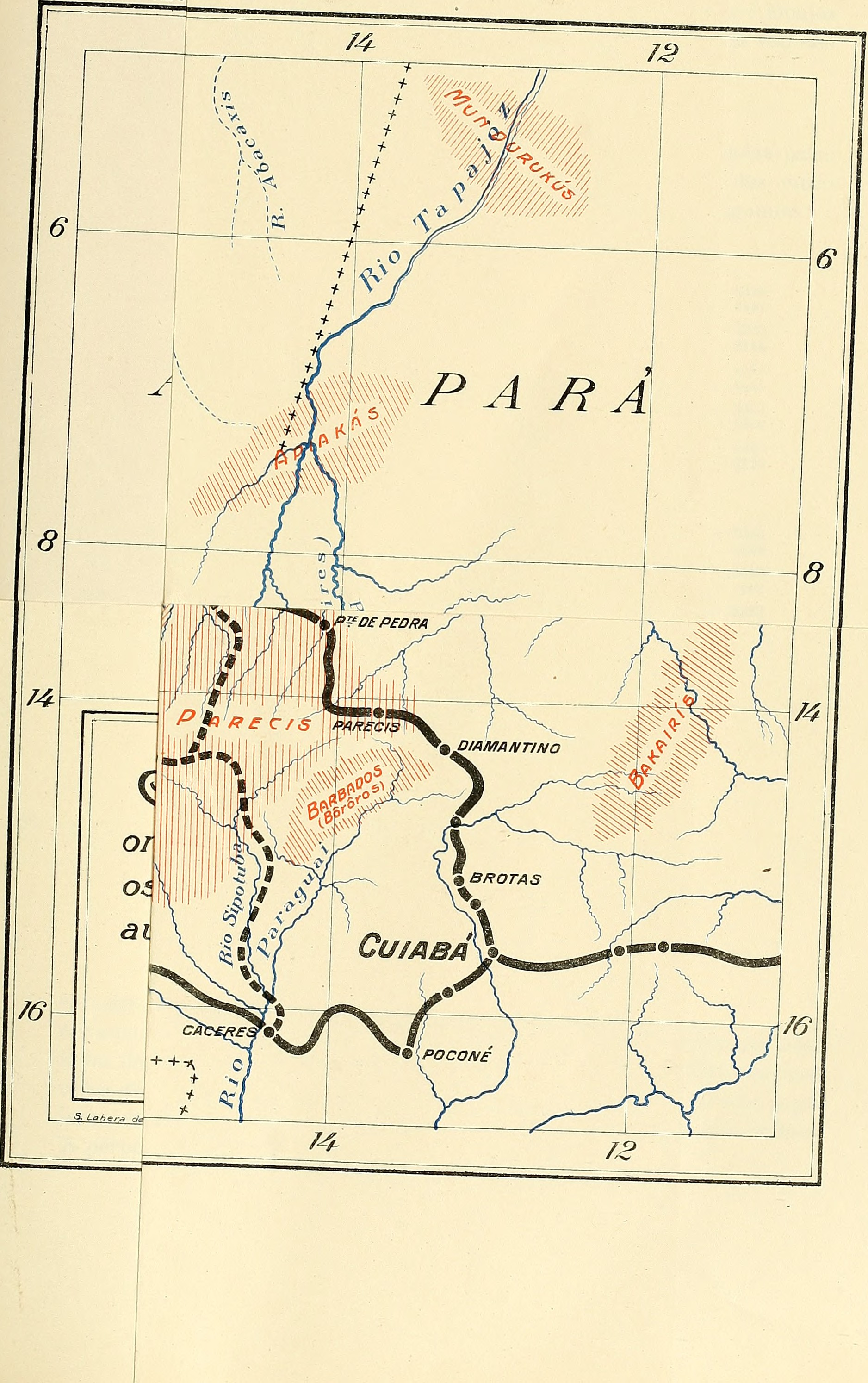
A digitally scanned page from the museum's Brazilian ethnology archives

The museum is still doing some festivals called Museu Nacional Vive or Museum lives to public in tents mounted in front of current under construction improvements to the burned headquarters, with exposition of fossils, living snakes and taxidermied animals like Pterosaurs and Armadillo among others. The museum would do a permanent exposition outside. By some estimates, it would take R$100 million to rebuild the main dependencies. With the exception of a few metal cabinets intact, there are only charred fragments. Around 80% of the roof and 60% of the floors have been affected. The one million euro aid announced by Germany would allow the installation of laboratories for analysis of archaeological finds. With this figure provided by the German Federal Foreign Office the Museum's team bought, among other things, high-quality digital cameras, rangefinders to locate buried material, and hundreds of plastic boxes to transport the material. A second transfer of 145,300 euros was used to modernize the museum's electrical network.

The museum director said there is a collective effort to rebuild the collection, pursue research, and plan the reconstruction of the institution housing six major graduate programs. He reported that classes, thesis defenses and dissertations were resumed and knowledge production did not stop. "The National Museum has lost part of its collection but has not lost the ability to create knowledge and do science," said the director. The social anthropology library, one of the most important in Latin America and totally destroyed by the fire, has received a considerable amount of donations, including the personal library of Rio de Janeiro researcher Gilberto Velho, who was dean of the Department of Anthropology of the museum until his death. Museum zoologists have already gone to the field to collect new specimens in an attempt to repopulate the invertebrate collection, one of the richest (with 5 million copies only in the case of insects) and harder hit by the fire. Before a revamped headquarters is available, Kellner said the museum's intention is to re-display its collection – still considerable – to the public. There is a collective funding campaign to allow the institution's loan back to schools and the plan to revitalize the museum's botanical garden so that it houses a small exhibition that would receive visitors again. "It would be an illusion, even a frivolous thing, to say that the old collection will be reconstituted, but we will continue to fulfill our role," said the director. It was also informed they plan to keep part of ruins as historical exposition with a high modern structure of equipment inside.

According to UFJR dean Roberto Leher, the facade and the exterior of the National Museum is to be preserved in the reconstruction works, but the building could be different. The recovery of the building will take into account a new concept of architecture. The cost would still depend on the concept of the museum. Technicians focus are on 3D modeling and a term of reference. New materials with low-carbon, energy-less, environmentally friendly will be used because it is a science museum. IPHAN has endorsed (since the property is overturned) to do the reconstruction taking this model into account. The new project could be with high roof space or with more slabs, depending the approval of R$100 million or € 22,610,000,00 in the budget of 2019.

On 7 May 2019, the museum presented 27 small pieces found of Egypt collection. The current director took the chance to ask for more money, a minimum of R$1 million to guarantee his services further. On 14 May 2019, the statue of the Bés god about 2,350 years old was found. The piece in rock and glass paste was one of the highlights of the collection.

The roof was finished on 8 June 2019, nine months after the fire. It is 23 m high sustained by 42 truss tower pillars with 30 thousand steel bars and 147 tons of total weight.

Cooperation agreement with the Italian government provides for restoration of damaged parts and long-term loan of Italian parts that would be displayed in the National Museum when it is ready for reopening. Until then, the exhibition would be installed in the Sala Roma of the Consulate General of Italy, in the Center of Rio de Janeiro. The Italian Ministry of Culture would collaborate in the restoration of a kore, a Greek female statue found in 1853 in a tomb in Italy, which was brought by Empress Teresa of Bourbon as part of her dowry for her marriage to Emperor Pedro II of Brazil. However, the director denied to borrow pieces. Instead, he prefers money donations, which is denied by Italian and French governments.

The museum reopened on 2 July 2025, while renovations are expected to be completed by the end of 2027.

== See also ==
- Notice on the National Museum – Notice from Portuguese Wikipedia team about the project that aims to create a collection of photos from the Museum
- List of destroyed heritage
- List of destroyed libraries
- Instituto Butantan § 2010 fire
