= List of meteorite impacts =

There are several lists of meteorite impacts of various types available:

- Category:Lists of impact craters contains lists on various planets, including Earth by continent
- Meteorite falls are observed
- Meteorite finds are rocks found on the ground which are geologically identified as meteorites
- Meteorite contains lists of the most notable of all of these
