= Native silver =

Naturally occurring pure metallic silver mineral

Native Silver
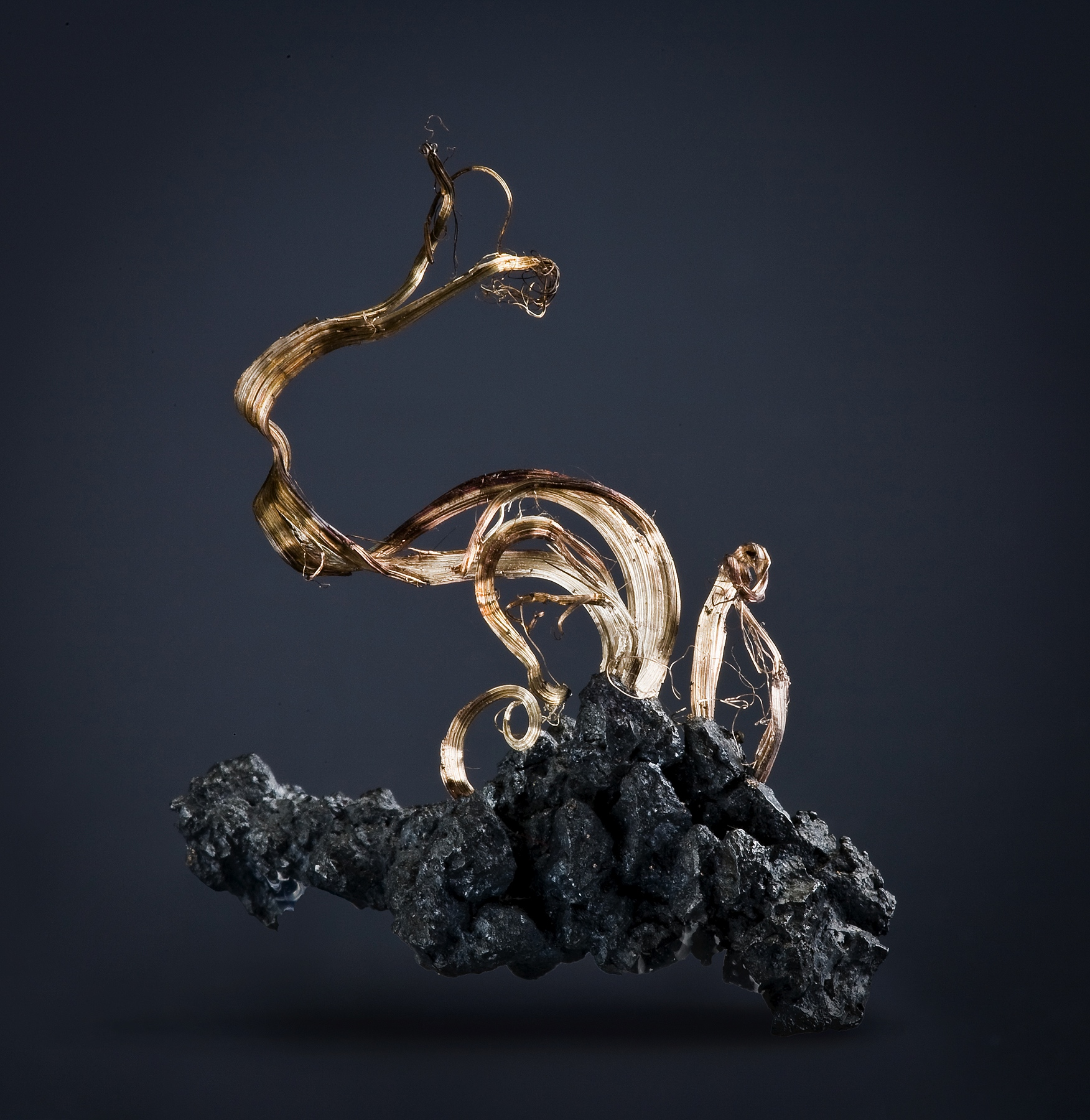
- Native silver specimen exhibiting robust crystallization from the Imiter Mine, Ouarzazate Province, Morocco (miniature size 4.3 × 4.1 × 2.1 cm)

General
- Category: Native metal
- Formula: Ag
- Strunz classification: 01.AA.05
- Dana classification: 1.1.1.3
- Crystal system: Isometric (Cubic)
- Crystal class: Hexoctahedral (m3̅m); H-M symbol: (4/m 3̅ 2/m)
- Space group: Fm3̅m
- Unit cell: a = 4.086 Å; Z = 4

Identification
- Color: Silver-white on freshly exposed surfaces; readily tarnishes to yellow, brown, dark gray, or black upon exposure to atmospheric hydrogen sulfide (H_{2}S)
- Crystal habit: Commonly massive, arborescent, dendritic, or as filiform (wire-like) twisted aggregates. Rarely as macroscopic cubes, dodecahedra, or octahedra.
- Twinning: Very common on ⟨111⟩, producing reticulated and complex dendritic arrays
- Cleavage: None
- Fracture: Hackly
- Tenacity: Highly malleable and ductile; sectile
- Mohs scale hardness: 2.5–3.0
- Luster: Metallic
- Streak: Silver-white (shining)
- Diaphaneity: Opaque
- Specific gravity: 10.1–11.1 (pure is 10.5; varies with presence of gold or copper)
- Melting point: 961.78 °C (1,763.20 °F)
- Fusibility: 2
- Diagnostic features: High specific gravity, distinctive silver-white shining streak, extreme ductility, complete solubility in nitric acid
- Solubility: Soluble in nitric acid and heated concentrated sulfuric acid
- Other characteristics: Exhibits the highest electrical (6.30 × 10^{7} S/m) and thermal conductivity of any metal at room temperature.

Native silver is a naturally occurring native element mineral consisting of the chemical element silver (Ag) in its pure, uncombined metallic form. It crystallizes in the cubic crystal system (isometric) with lattice parameter a = 4.086 Å and space group Fm3̅m. Silver has an average continental crustal abundance of approximately 0.056 parts per million (ppm). While rarely found in its elemental state, it more commonly occurs in compound forms such as sulfide minerals or sulfosalt minerals. Native silver occurs with crystallographic habits including filiform (wire-like), arborescent, and dendritic structures in hydrothermal veins, and constitutes only a minor fraction of global production, which is primarily sourced as a by-product from base-metal ores.

== Crystallography and physical characteristics ==
Native silver crystallizes in the cubic crystal system (isometric), belonging to the hexoctahedral class (Fm3̅m), with lattice parameter a = 4.086 Å. Despite this highly symmetrical underlying lattice, well-formed macroscopic crystals—such as cubes, octahedra, or dodecahedra—are rare. The mineral exhibits kinetic and structurally distorted growth forms due to rapid precipitation from supersaturated hydrothermal fluids. Filiform and dendritic habits are common. Wire silver occurs as striated, twisted, and curled strands. These wires commonly form as silver-bearing sulfides—most often acanthite (Ag_{2}S)—break down, allowing metallic silver to grow outward as thin, wire-like strands, a documented mechanism particularly in certain low-temperature hydrothermal systems. Arborescent and dendritic habits result from accelerated crystal growth in open vugs, where branching structures develop along the ⟨111⟩ crystallographic axes. Complex twinning, particularly spinel-law twinning on the ⟨111⟩ plane, occurs in these formations. Native silver has a Mohs hardness of 2.5 to 3.0. It is sectile, and can be carved with a steel knife. Its ductility and malleability allow it to be drawn into fine wires or hammered into foils. Thick wires often exhibit natural work hardening due to plastic deformation during growth or emplacement. The specific gravity of the pure mineral is 10.5, though natural specimens range from 10.1 to 11.1 due to solid-solution alloying. Freshly fractured or polished native silver exhibits a silver-white color and metallic luster, reflecting 92–97% of incident visible light. It possesses the highest electrical (6.30 × 10^{7} S/m) and thermal conductivity of any metal at room temperature.

Native silver may also occur as pseudomorphs after acanthite, where silver sulfide (Ag_{2}S) is replaced by metallic silver while preserving the original crystal morphology.

== Geochemistry, paragenesis, and alteration ==
The occurrence of silver in its native metallic state requires geochemical conditions with low fugacity of sulfur (fS_{2}) and strongly reducing conditions (low Eh). This stability can be visualized in Eh–pH predominance diagrams, where native silver occupies a field under low Eh and low sulfide activity. Thermodynamically, native silver is favored over acanthite (Ag_{2}S) under conditions where ΔG° for the reaction 2Ag + S → Ag_{2}S becomes positive (i.e., low sulfur activity and reducing Eh). When sulfur is abundant, silver precipitates as acanthite, proustite (Ag_{3}AsS_{3}), or pyrargyrite (Ag_{3}SbS_{3}). Native silver often forms during late stages of mineralization in many hydrothermal systems or in supergene environments where silver sulfides are oxidized and reduced by meteoric water. Native silver forms a solid solution series with gold (Au); compositions containing more than 20% gold are classified as electrum. Substitution of copper (Cu) occurs, and trace mercury (Hg), antimony (Sb), bismuth (Bi), and arsenic (As) are detected. High-mercury varieties are natural silver amalgams. As a noble metal, native silver resists oxidation by oxygen but reacts with hydrogen sulfide (H_{2}S). Tarnish forms a superficial amorphous sulfide (Ag_{2}S), progressing through colors to dark gray or black. Native silver dissolves in nitric acid (HNO_{3}), producing silver nitrate (AgNO_{3}), but is inert in cold hydrochloric acid (HCl).

== Geological occurrence and global distribution ==
Distribution of world silver mine production (2011)

Native silver occurs as a trace mineral in a wide range of geological environments, but specimens suitable for macroscopic collection and study are restricted to specific metallogenic provinces with favorable geochemical conditions. It is most commonly associated with low-sulfidation epithermal veins hosted in felsic volcanic rocks and with the oxidized upper profiles (supergene enrichment zones) of polymetallic base-metal deposits. In addition to the primary paragenetic assemblage of calcite, quartz, barite, fluorite, various sulfosalts, and base metal sulfides such as galena (PbS), sphalerite (ZnS), and chalcopyrite (CuFeS_{2}), native silver frequently occurs alongside secondary copper carbonates (such as malachite Cu_{2}CO_{3}(OH)_{2} and azurite Cu_{3}(CO_{3})_{2}(OH)_{2}), tellurides (including hessite Ag_{2}Te, petzite Ag_{3}AuTe_{2}, and sylvanite (Ag,Au)Te_{2}), and other precious metal-bearing phases. Native silver is particularly characteristic of several distinct deposit types beyond the classic Five-Element veins. These include:

- Low-sulfidation epithermal systems, where silver precipitates in open vugs and fractures during late-stage fluid evolution.
- Supergene enrichment zones in polymetallic sulfide deposits, where oxidation and downward migration of meteoric water lead to reduction and redeposition of silver as native metal.
- Auriferous–argentiferous (Ag–Au) veins, where native silver coexists with native gold and electrum, often in quartz-carbonate gangue.
- Ag–Cu–Au associations in polymetallic veins, with native silver intergrown with native copper, cuprite, and gold.
- Au–Te–Ag telluride-rich systems, where native silver occurs with calaverite (AuTe_{2}), krennerite ((Au,Ag)Te_{2}), and coloradoite (HgTe).

These associations reflect the geochemical mobility of silver under varying sulfur fugacity, redox conditions, and fluid composition. In many cases, native silver marks the terminal phase of mineralization sequences, crystallizing atop pre-existing sulfides and sulfosalts after sulfur depletion or in oxidizing supergene settings.

Associated minerals and silver-bearing species

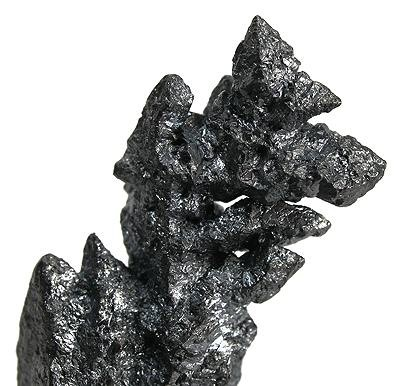
Acanthite (silver sulfide), a common associate and alteration product of native silver.

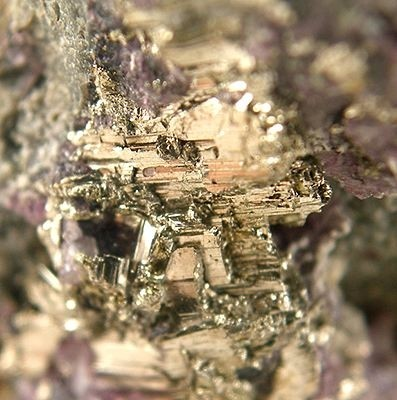
Calaverite (gold telluride) with purple fluorite from the Cripple Creek district.

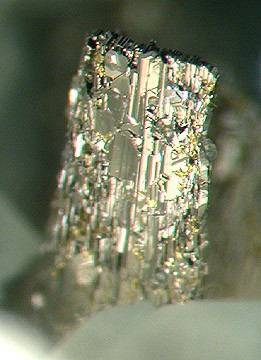
Krennerite, a rare silver-gold telluride showing distinct orthorhombic cleavage.

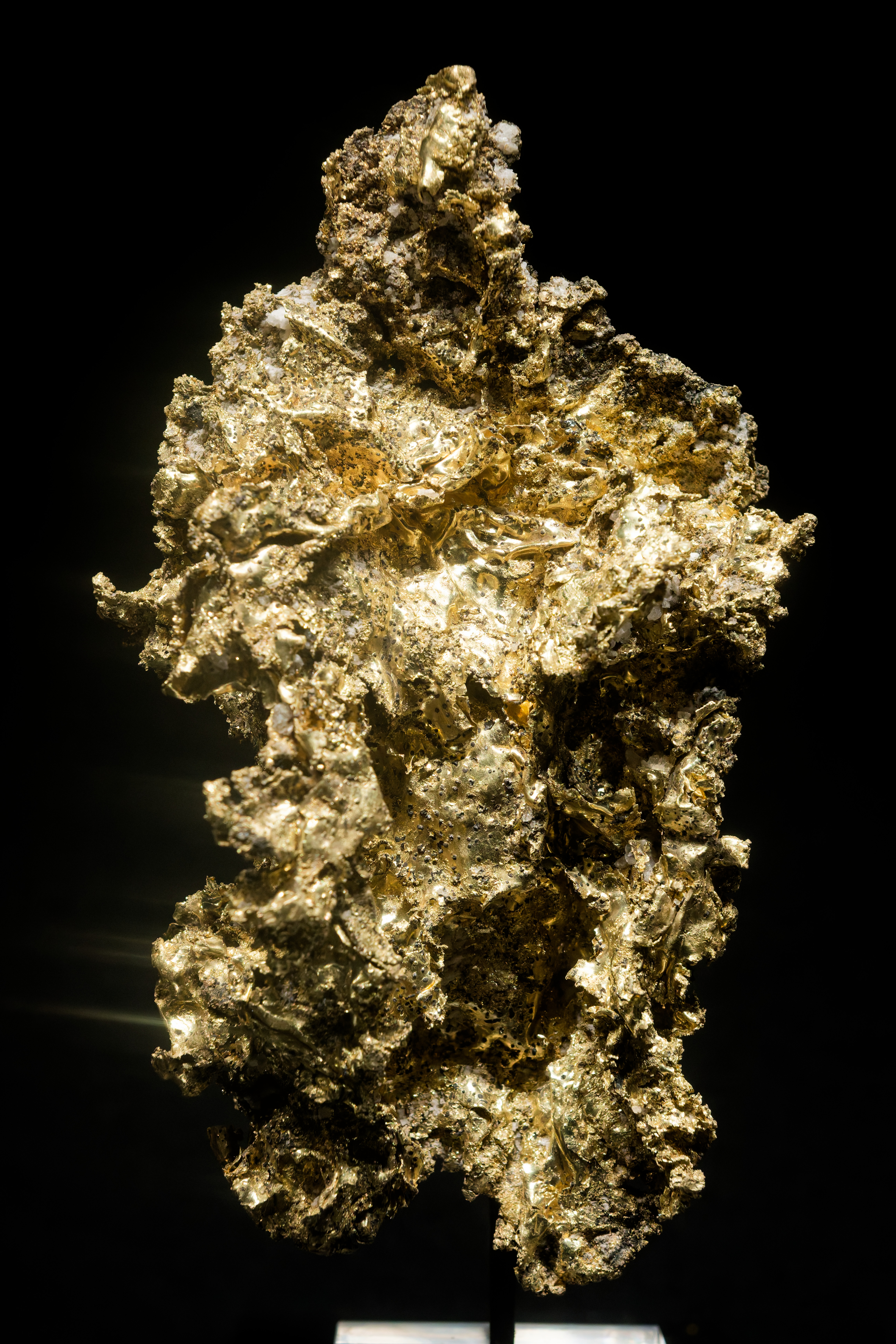
Electrum, a natural alloy of gold and silver, showing a pale yellow metallic luster.

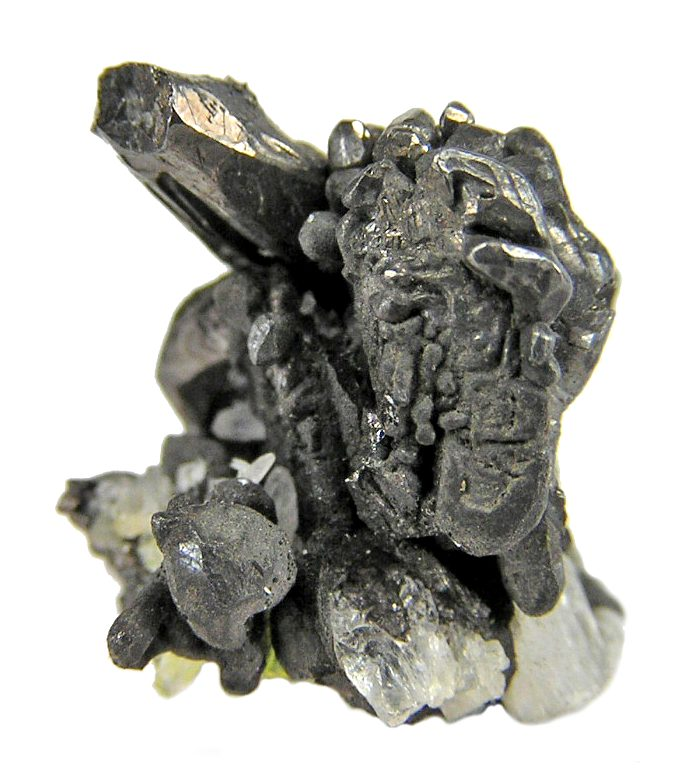
Hessite (silver telluride) associated with native gold crystals.

=== The Five-Element (Ag–Ni–Co–Bi–U) veins ===
These specialized hydrothermal deposits are characterized by the coexistence of native elements (Ag, Bi) with nickel and cobalt arsenides, often accompanied by uraninite. They are sources of macroscopic native silver.

- Kongsberg, Norway: The Kongsberg Silver Mining District is globally renowned for its thick wire silver aggregates. Mining from 1623 to 1958 intersected vein systems where hydrothermal fluids interacted with carbonaceous sedimentary beds, creating localized reducing environments conducive to wire formation.
- Freiberg, Germany: Located in the Ore Mountains (Erzgebirge), Freiberg produced dendritic and arborescent silver associated with proustite and stephanite.
- Cobalt District, Canada: Discovered in 1903 in Ontario, this district produced slabs of native silver intergrown with skutterudite and smaltite. Ores contained high silver content, being shipped directly to smelters.
Geological landscapes and major historical silver-producing districts

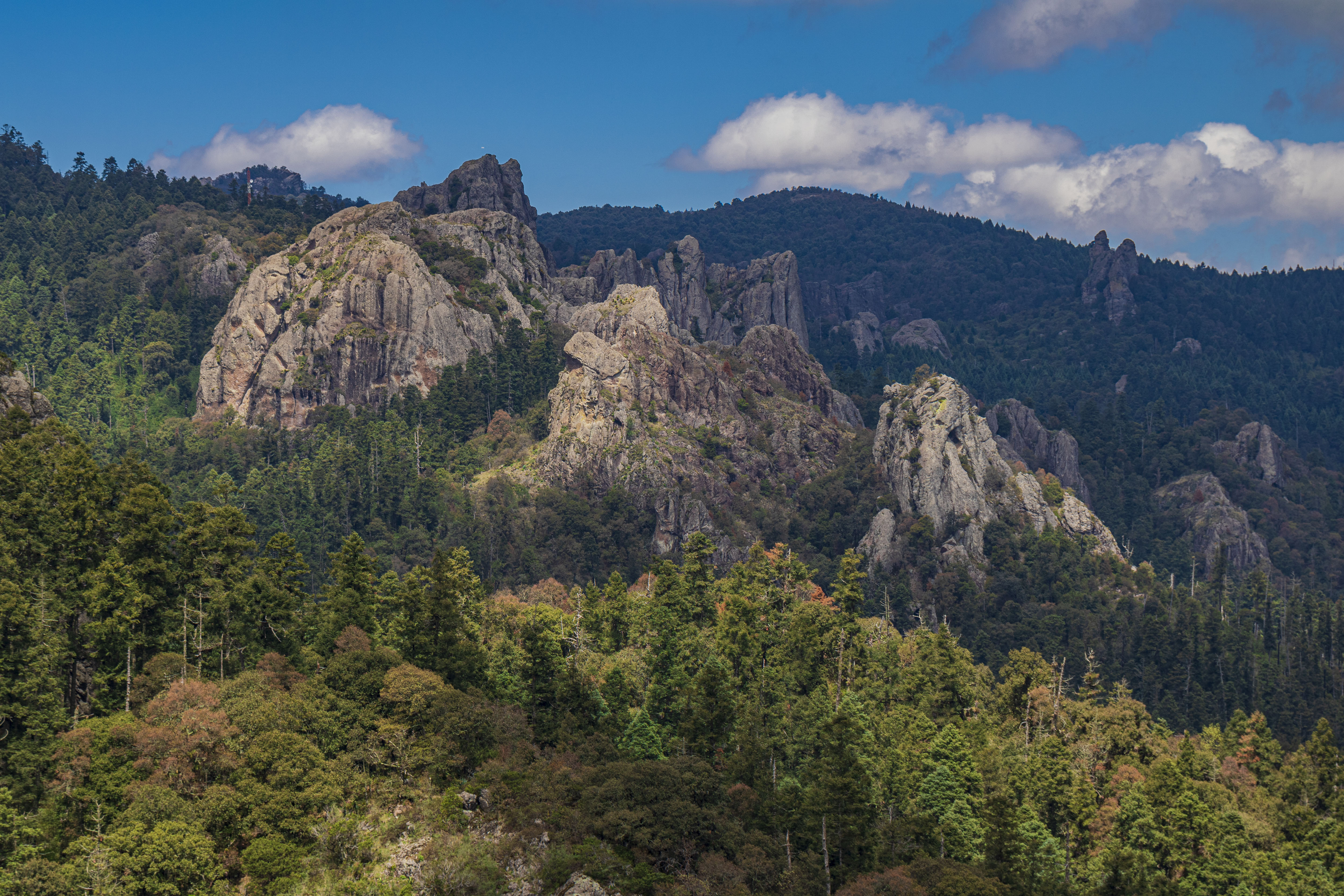
The volcanic landscape of the Pachuca Range, part of the world-class Pachuca-Real del Monte epithermal system.

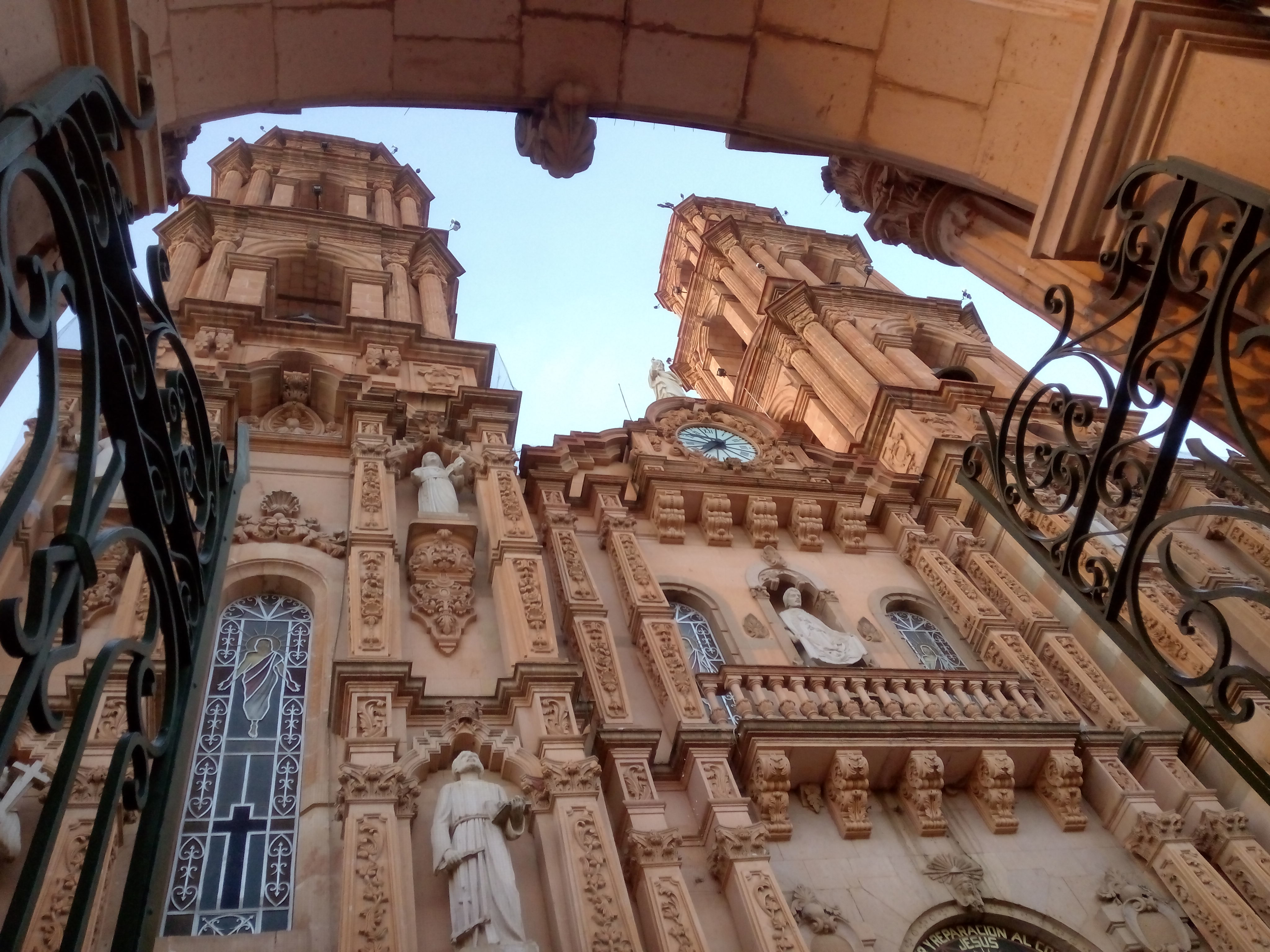
Neoclassical facade of the Sagrado Corazón Temple in Fresnillo, Zacatecas, showing local stonework from a region historically centered on silver extraction.

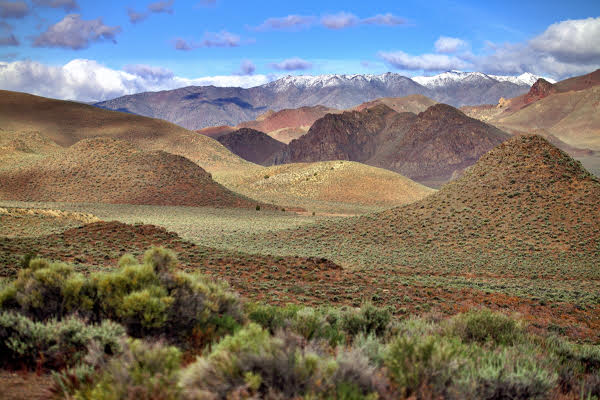
The Virginia Range in Nevada, host to the Comstock Lode, the first major silver discovery in the United States.

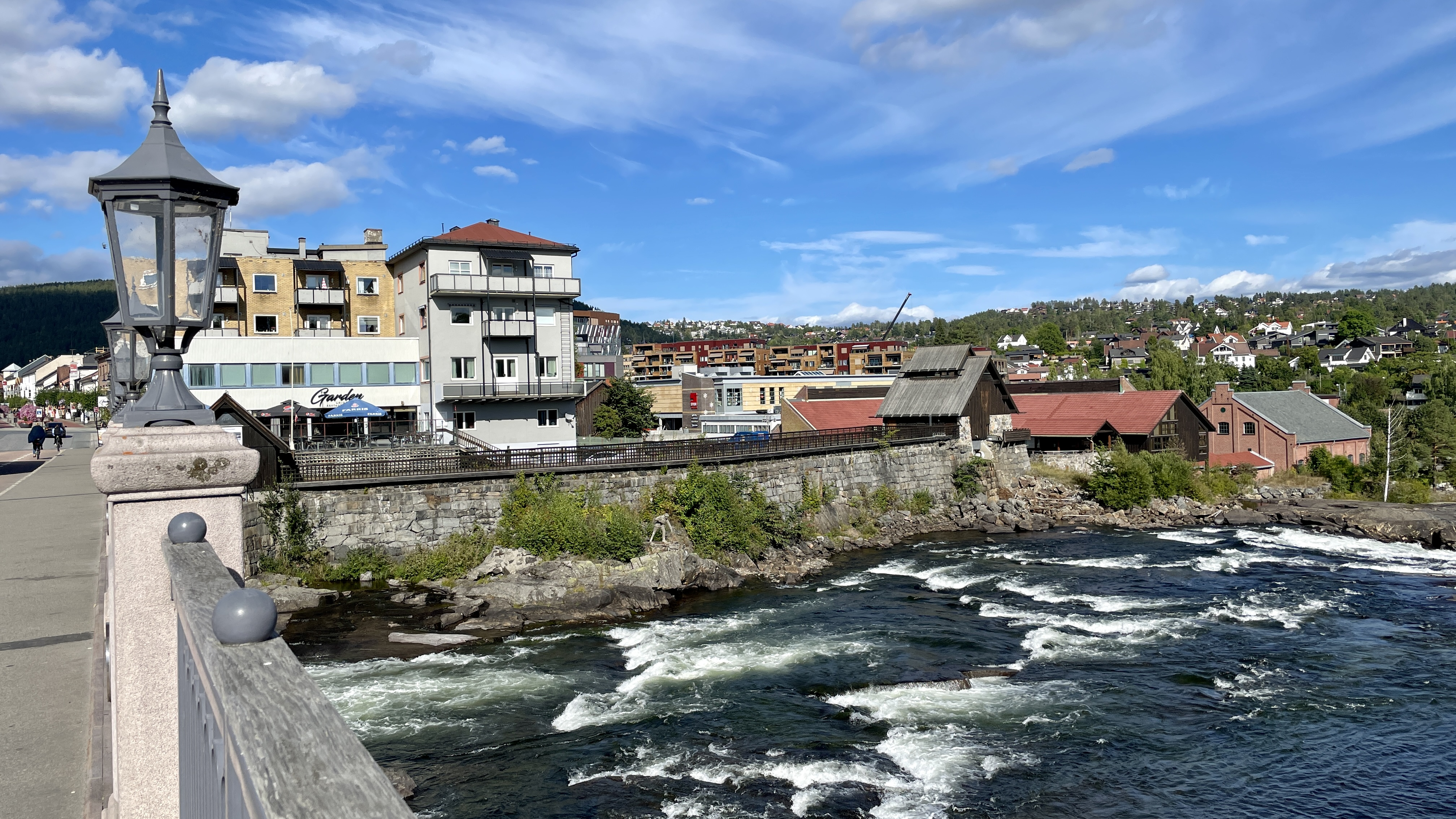
Historic stone bridge in the Kongsberg Silver Mining District, Norway, famous for its native silver-bearing carbonate veins.

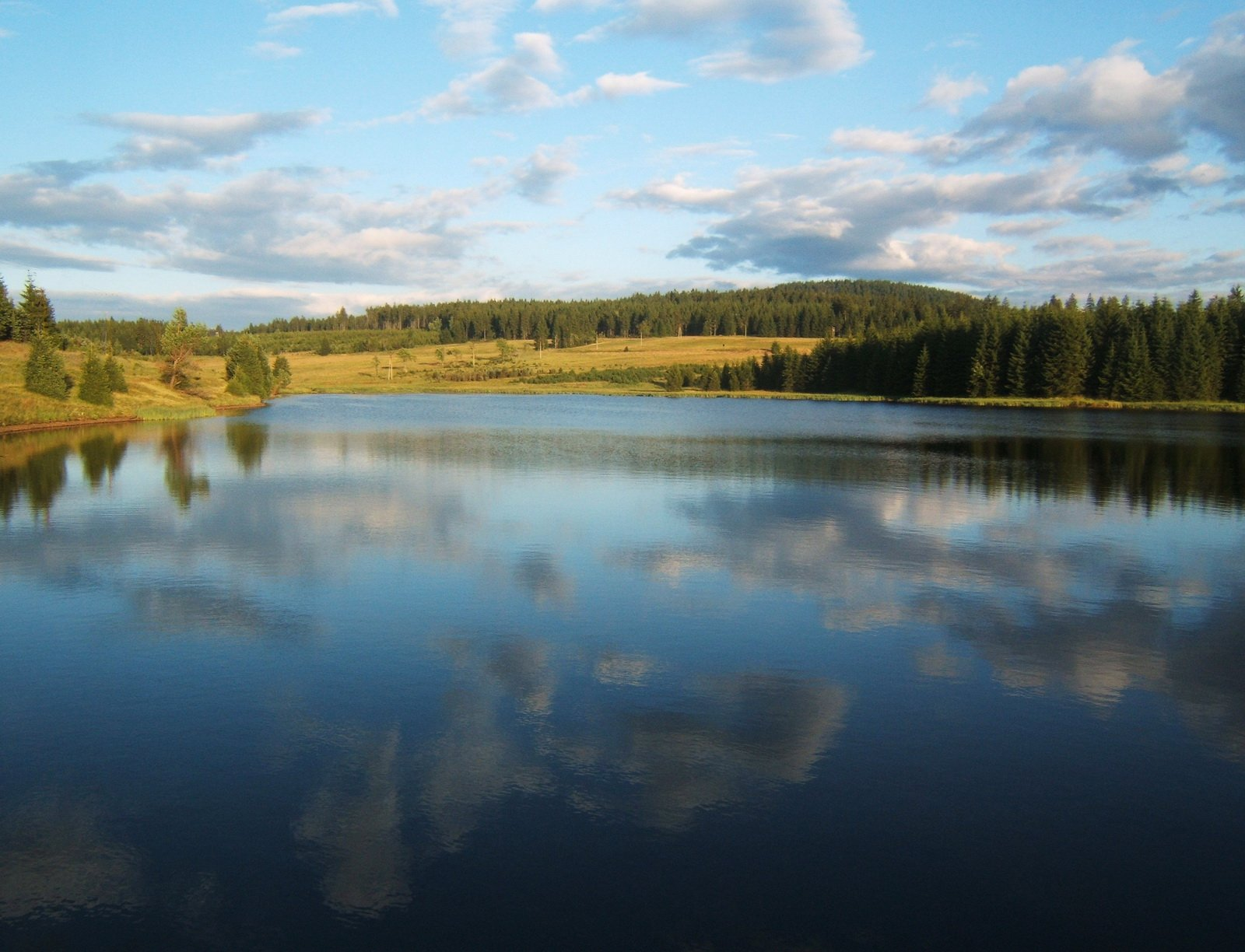
The Erzgebirge (Ore Mountains) at Myslivny, a classic European locality for historic five-element vein silver deposits.

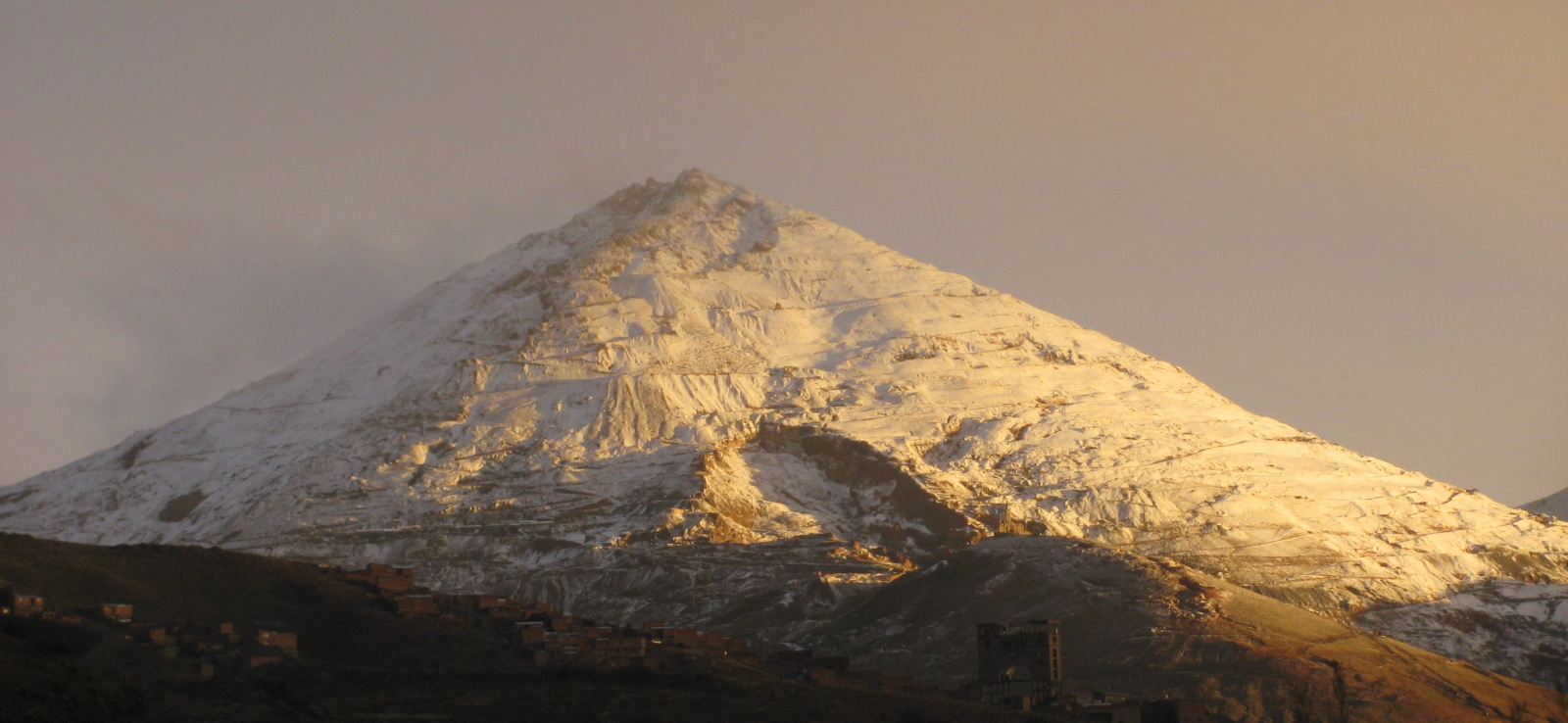
View of the Cerro Rico in Potosí, Bolivia, a massive silver-tin deposit within the Bolivian tin belt.

=== Epithermal Systems of the Americas and North Africa ===
Tertiary volcanic belts in the American Cordillera and related regions host major epithermal silver systems responsible for much of historical production.

- Mexico: The Sierra Madre Occidental is one of the world's most silver-rich provinces. Notable localities include Batopilas in Chihuahua (famous for herringbone dendrites in white calcite), Fresnillo in Zacatecas, Taxco in Guerrero, and the Pachuca-Real del Monte Mining District in Hidalgo, where supergene zones produced abundant wires and masses.
- United States: The western United States hosted some of the most famous and productive epithermal silver districts in history. The Comstock Lode in Nevada (discovered in 1859) was the first major silver rush in the U.S., producing hundreds of millions of dollars in silver and gold from bonanza veins rich in native silver, argentite, and electrum. Other notable districts include Cerro Gordo in California (one of the richest silver camps in the 1870s, with massive native silver masses from supergene zones). Tonopah in Nevada (silver-rich epithermal veins with native silver and tellurides) and Cripple Creek in Colorado (primarily gold but with significant native silver in telluride associations).
- Morocco: The Imiter Mine in the Anti-Atlas mountains is a world-class epithermal deposit hosted in Neoproterozoic rocks. It is renowned for lustrous, sharply crystallized, heavily twinned native silver crystals often associated with dark acanthite or green chlorite.

Andes: Deposits such as Cerro Rico de Potosí in Bolivia and Cerro de Pasco in Peru produced enormous quantities of silver from supergene oxidation of massive sulfosalt bodies, leaving thick crusts of spongy native silver.

== Historical significance and metallurgy ==
Beyond its mineralogical occurrence, native silver held historical significance in metallurgy and economy. It was utilized early, alongside gold and copper, for ornamental and utilitarian purposes from the 4th millennium BCE in Anatolia and the Aegean.

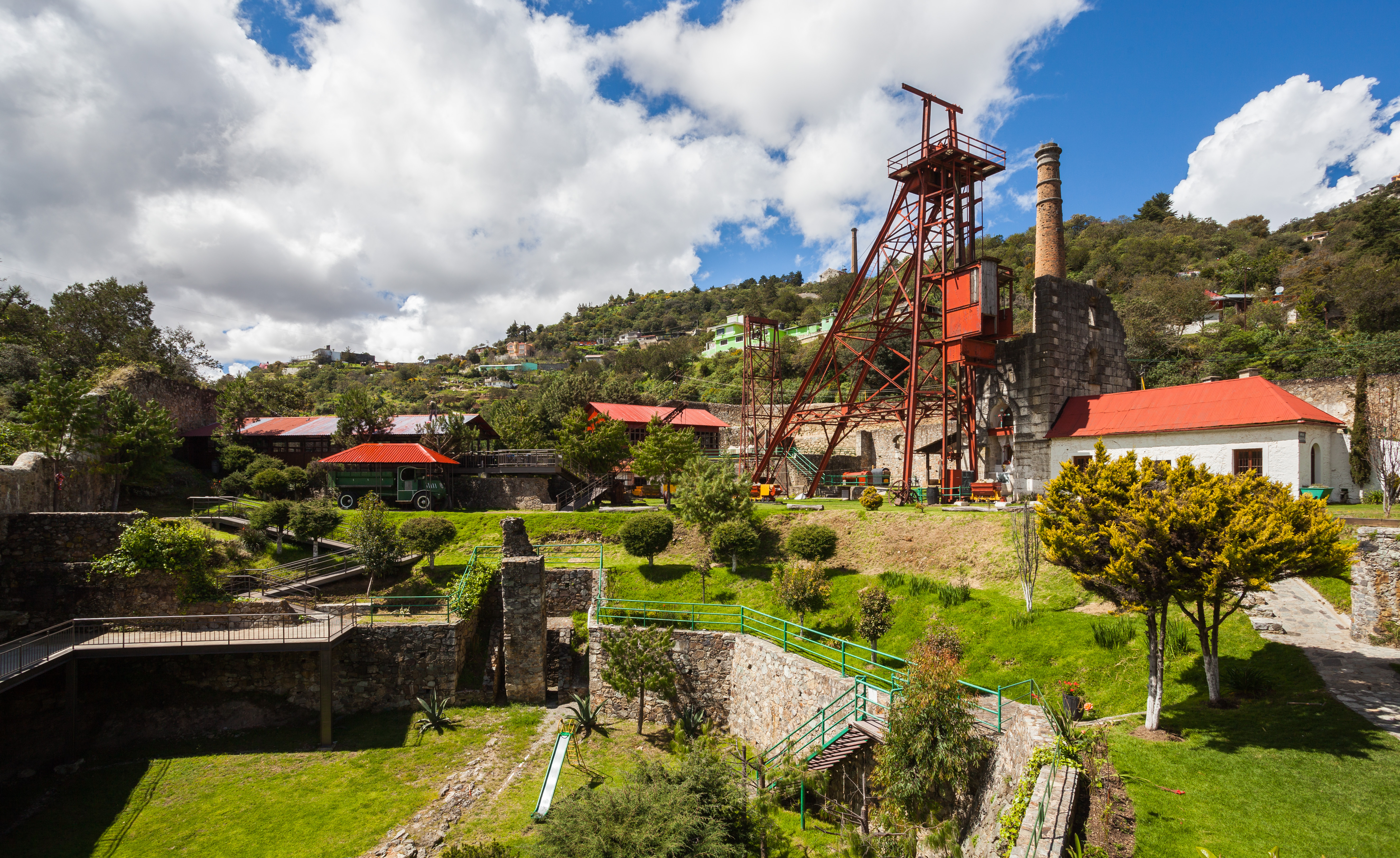
The Acosta Mine in Real del Monte, Hidalgo.

In Ancient Egypt, silver was associated with the moon, ritual purity, and the bones of the gods due to its pale color. It was used for beads as early as the Predynastic Period (ca. 4400–3100 BCE) and for personal ornaments and cult objects through Roman times. Silver was valued more highly than gold for much of Egypt's history and was imported from neighboring lands, as local sources were limited. Silver jewelry and vessels symbolized purity and divine connection in temples and elite burials.

In Pre-Columbian Mesoamerica and the Andes, native silver and silver-bearing ores were exploited by indigenous cultures for ceremonial objects, jewelry, and ritual items. In regions such as modern-day Mexico and Peru, native peoples hammered native silver into thin sheets or shaped it into figurines and adornments, demonstrating sophisticated knowledge of metal properties long before European contact.

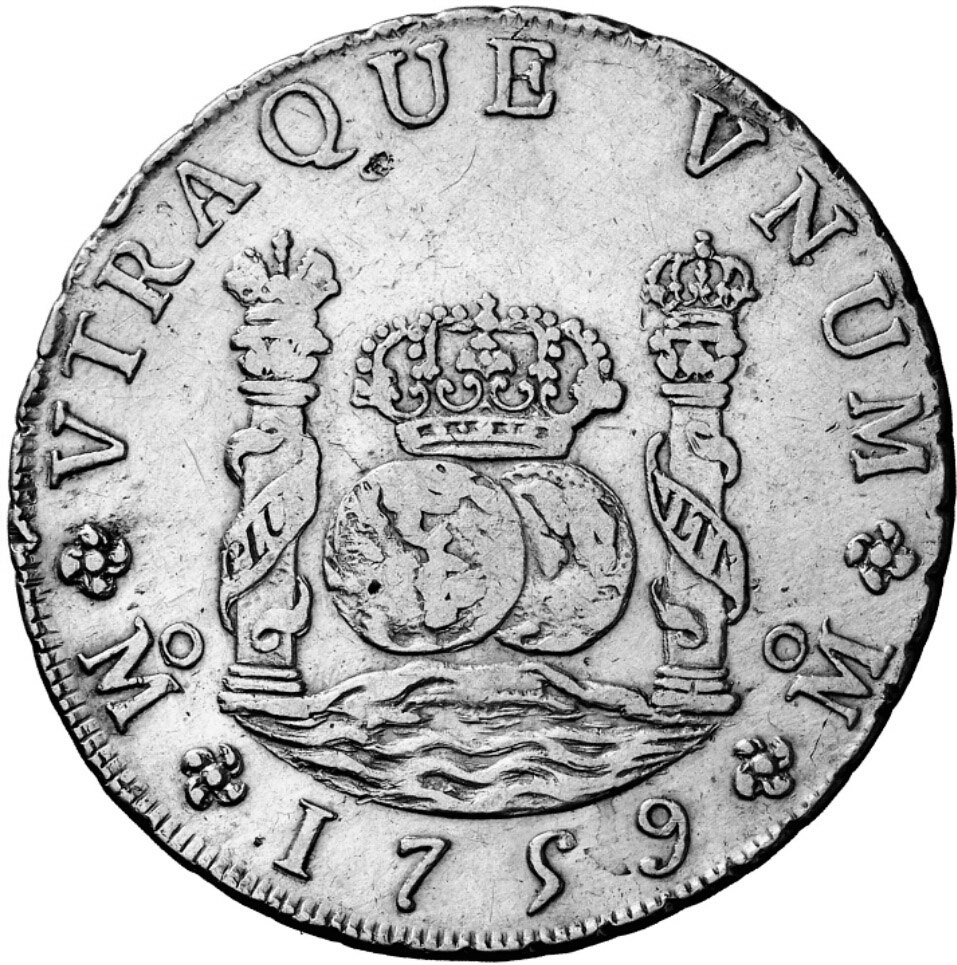
Reverse of a 1759 silver Spanish dollar.

The arrival of European powers in the New World transformed native silver from a local prestige material into a cornerstone of global economy. The discovery of massive silver deposits in the Spanish colonies, particularly in Mexico, initiated one of the largest metal extraction enterprises in history. Guanajuato became the world's leading silver district in the late 18th century, with the Valenciana Mine producing about 30% of the world's total supply during its peak, yielding immense wealth that funded colonial infrastructure and Spanish power. Zacatecas, discovered in 1546, was Mexico's chief mining camp for centuries, maintaining high production despite periodic declines and contributing significantly to New Spain's silver output. A pivotal innovation was the patio process, developed by Bartolomé de Medina in Pachuca in 1554. This mercury amalgamation technique allowed efficient extraction of silver from low-grade ores, revolutionizing production and enabling Spain to dominate global silver supply for centuries. The silver from Guanajuato, Zacatecas, and other districts supported Spain's economy, financed European wars, and was minted into the Spanish dollar (real de a ocho), which became the world's first global currency.

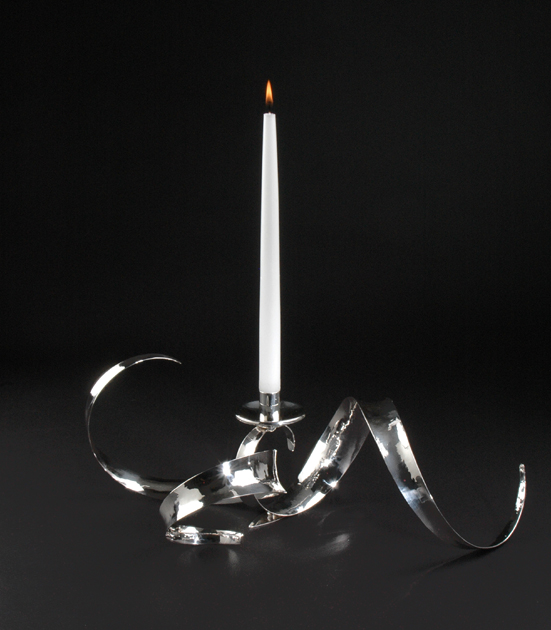
Hand-forged sterling silver candlestick centerpiece.

Silver from New Spain circulated widely in Asia, Africa, and Europe, influencing trade networks and contributing to early globalization.

In the United States, the Comstock Lode in Nevada (discovered in 1859) marked the first major silver rush, producing hundreds of millions of dollars in silver and gold from bonanza veins rich in native silver, argentite, and electrum. In Canada, the Cobalt District in Ontario (discovered in 1903) yielded massive slabs of native silver intergrown with arsenides, becoming one of the richest silver camps in history. Crystalline and wire forms of native silver were often melted into bullion for export, but well-preserved historical specimens are rare due to systematic smelting. Some exceptional pieces from colonial mines survive in museums, serving as tangible links to this era of silver-driven economic transformation.

== Comparison with associated native elements ==
Comparisons based on reported frequencies in mineralogical literature and collections (Handbook of Mineralogy, Mindat.org). Over 80% of global silver supply (estimated at 26,000 tonnes in 2025) is a by-product from smelting polymetallic sulfide ores.

Mineral	Chemical Formula	Hardness (Mohs)	Specific Gravity	Dominant Crystallographic Habit	Relative resistance to alteration/oxidation	Relative rarity as macroscopic specimens
Native Silver	Ag	2.5–3.0	10.1–11.1	Wires (filiform), dendrites, arborescent sprays	Low to moderate	High
Native copper	Cu	2.5–3.0	8.9	Massive nodules, complex dendrites, distinct rhombs	Low	Moderate
Native gold	Au	2.5–3.0	19.3	Nuggets, flattened flakes, octahedra, hopper crystals	Extreme	Moderate to high
Native platinum	Pt	4.0–4.5	21.5	Rounded alluvial grains, rare cubic microcrystals	Extreme	Very high

== Gallery ==
Representative native silver specimens by locality

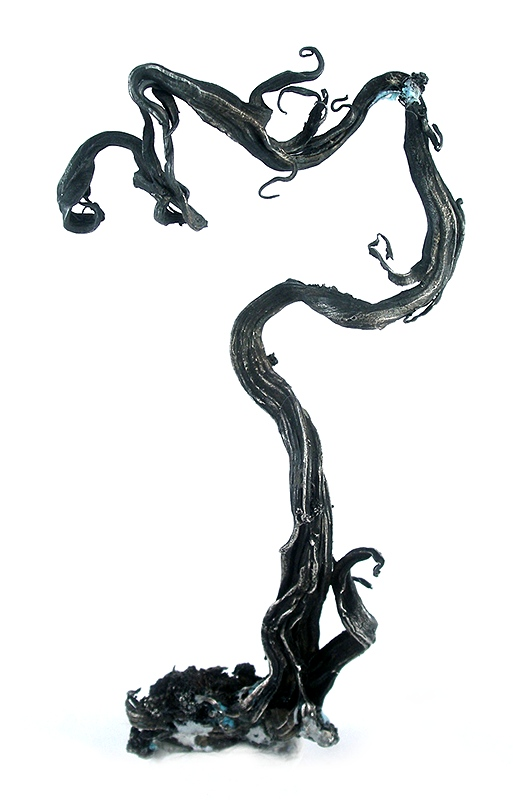
Crystalline silver wires with acanthite. Imiter Mine, Morocco.

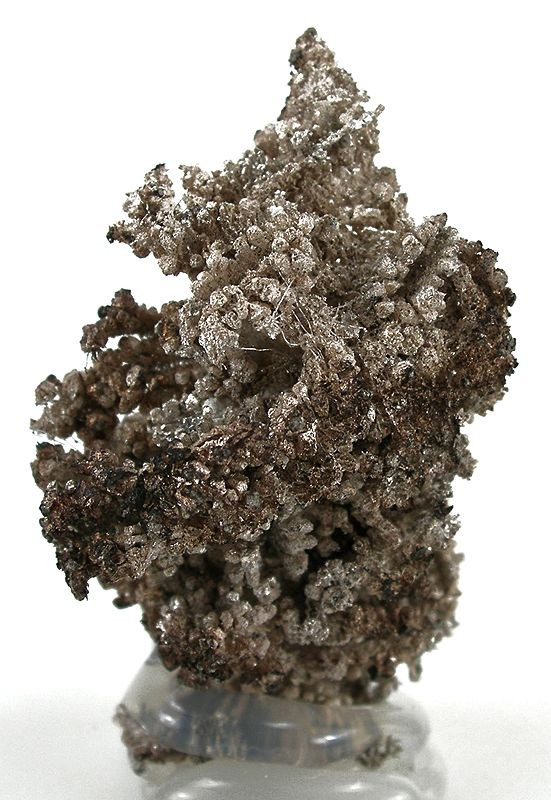
Arborescent native silver on calcite matrix. Balcoll Mine, Spain.

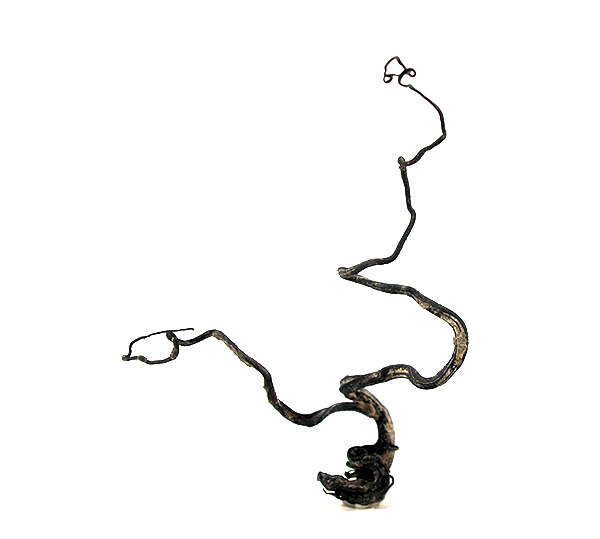
Filiform native silver with dark tarnish. Kongsberg, Norway.

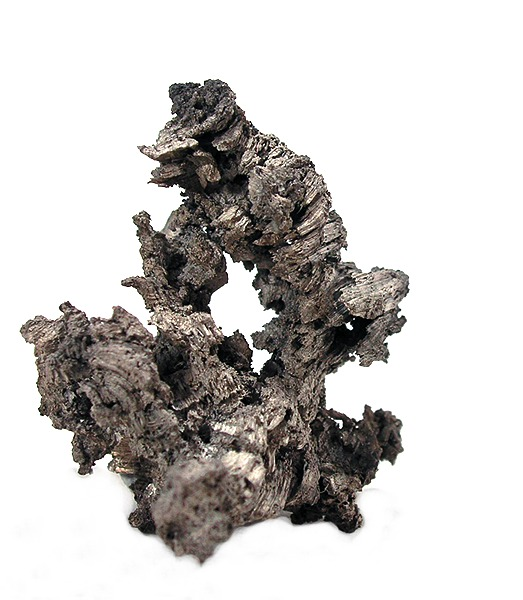
Wire silver from Saxony District. Himmelsfürst Mine, Germany.

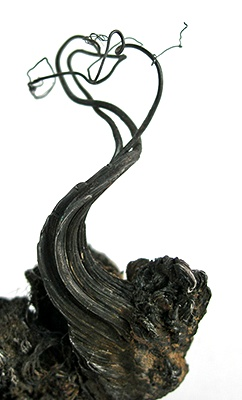
Native silver ropes and wires. Himmelsfürst Mine, Germany.

== See also ==
- Silver
- Native element mineral – Elements that occur in nature as minerals in uncombined form
- Precious metal – Rare, naturally occurring metallic chemical element of high economic and cultural value
- Supergene (geology) – In geology, processes or enrichment that occur near the surface
- Noble metal – Metallic elements that are nearly chemically inert
- Gangue – Commercially worthless material that surrounds a wanted mineral in ore
- Native state (metallurgy) – Form of metal
