= Native element mineral =

Elements that occur in nature as minerals in uncombined form

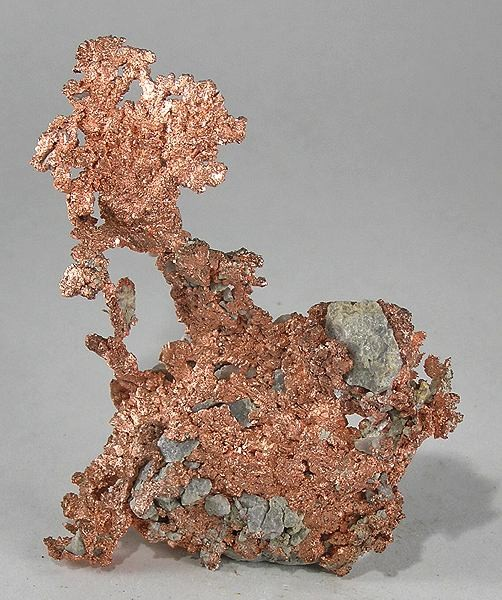
Native copper

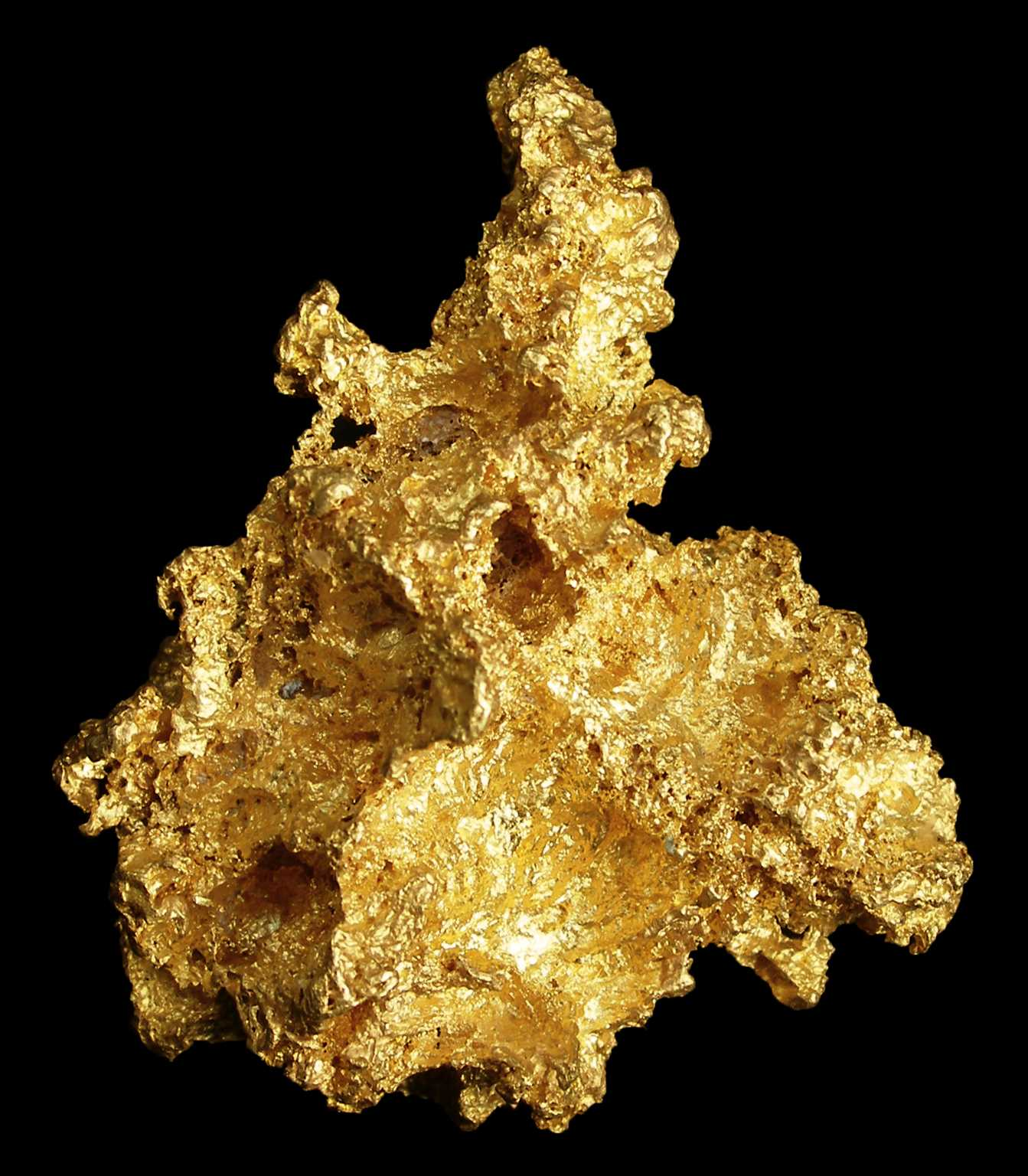
Native gold

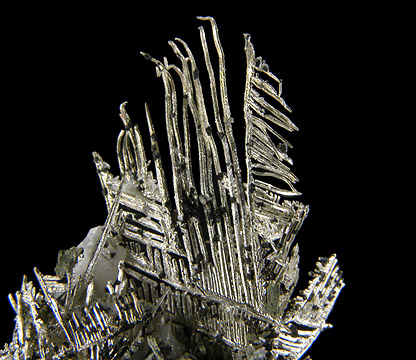
Native silver

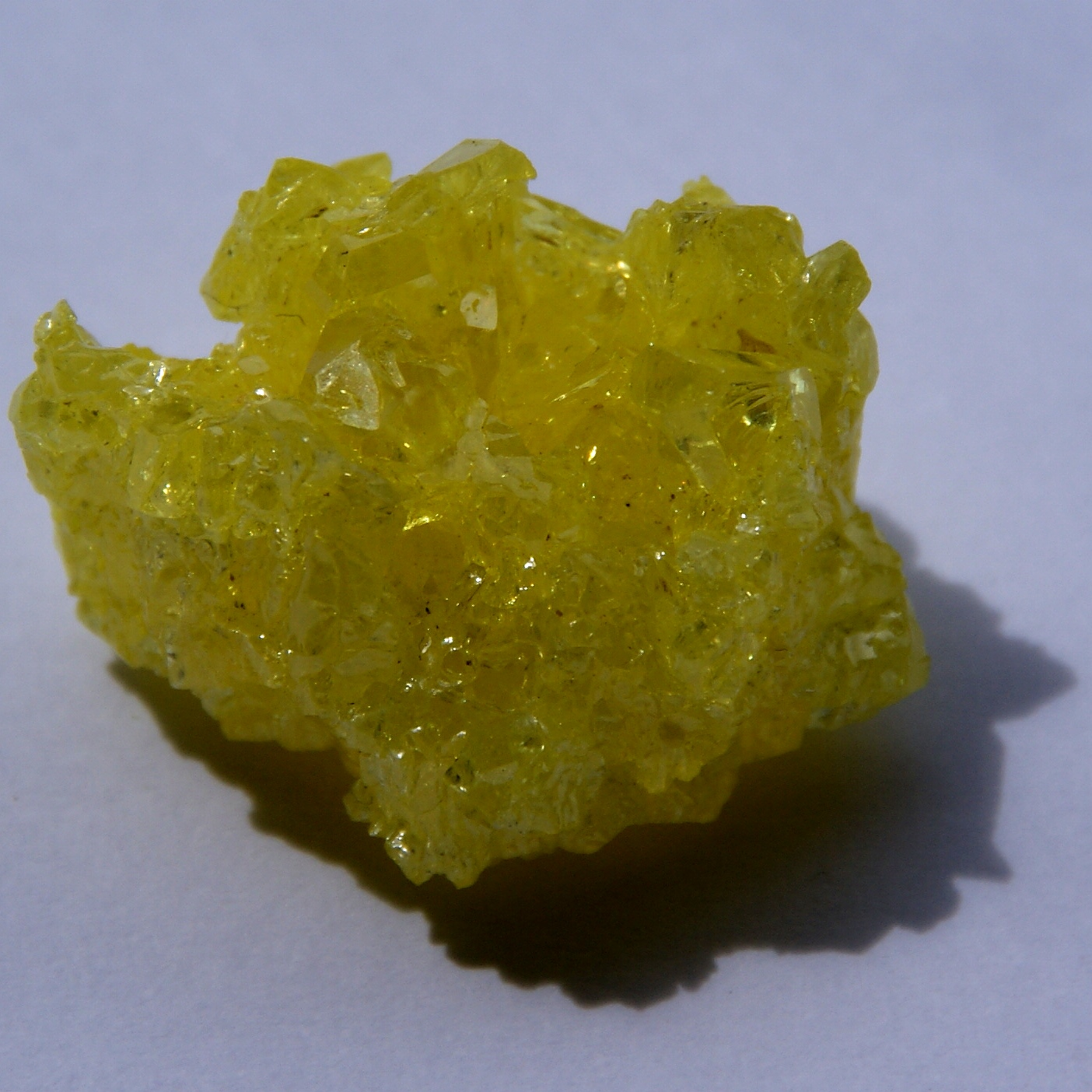
Native sulfur

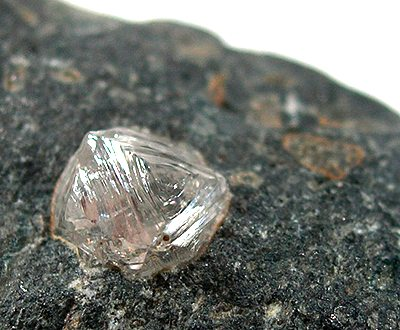
Diamond (native carbon)

Native element minerals are those elements that occur in nature in uncombined form with a distinct mineral structure. The elemental class includes metals, intermetallic compounds, alloys, metalloids, and nonmetals. The Nickel–Strunz classification system also includes the naturally occurring phosphides, silicides, nitrides, carbides, and arsenides.

== Elements ==
The following elements occur as native element minerals or alloys:

- Aluminium
  - Native aluminium
- Antimony
  - Native antimony
- Arsenic
- Bismuth
- Cadmium
- Carbon
  - Diamond
  - Graphite
- Chromium
- Cobalt
- Copper
  - Native copper
- Gold
- Indium
- Iridium
- Iron
  - Telluric iron
- Lead
- Manganese
- Mercury
- Molybdenum
- Nickel
- Niobium
- Osmium
- Palladium
- Platinum
- Rhenium
- Rhodium
- Selenium
- Silicon
- Silver
  - Native silver
- Sulfur
- Tantalum
- Tellurium
- Tin
- Titanium
- Tungsten
- Vanadium
  - Native vanadium
- Zinc

== Nickel–Strunz Classification -01- Native elements ==
This list uses the Classification of Nickel–Strunz (mindat.org, 10 ed, pending publication).

Abbreviations

- "*" – discredited (IMA/CNMNC status).
- "?" – questionable/doubtful (IMA/CNMNC status).
- "REE" – Rare-earth element (Sc, Y, La, Ce, Pr, Nd, Pm, Sm, Eu, Gd, Tb, Dy, Ho, Er, Tm, Yb, Lu)
- "PGE" – Platinum-group element (Ru, Rh, Pd, Os, Ir, Pt)
- 03.C Aluminofluorides, 06 Borates, 08 Vanadates (04.H V^{[5,6]} Vanadates), 09 Silicates:
  - Neso: insular (from Greek νησος nēsos, island)
  - Soro: grouping (from Greek σωροῦ sōros, heap, mound (especially of corn))
  - Cyclo: ring
  - Ino: chain (from Greek ις [genitive: ινος inos], fibre)
  - Phyllo: sheet (from Greek φύλλον phyllon, leaf)
  - Tecto: three-dimensional framework

Nickel–Strunz code scheme
NN.XY.##x:

- NN: Nickel–Strunz mineral class number
- X: Nickel–Strunz mineral division letter
- Y: Nickel–Strunz mineral family letter
- ##x: Nickel–Strunz mineral/group number, x add-on letter

=== Class: native elements ===
- 01.A Metals and intermetallic alloys
  - 01.AA Copper-cupalite family: 05 native copper, 05 lead, 05 native gold, 05 native silver, 05 nickel, 05 aluminium; 10a auricupride, 10b tetra-auricupride; 15 novodneprite, 15 khatyrkite, 15 anyuiite; 20 cupalite, 25 hunchunite
  - 01.AB Zinc-brass family (Cu-Zn alloys): 05 cadmium, 05 zinc, 05 titanium*, 05 rhenium*; 10a brass*, 10a zhanghengite, 10b danbaite, 10b tongxinite*
  - 01.AC Indium-tin family: 05 indium, 10 tin; 15 yuanjiangite, 15 sorosite
  - 01.AD Mercury-amalgam family: 00 amalgam*, 05 mercury; 10 belendorffite, 10 kolymite; 15a paraschachnerite, 15a schachnerite, 15b luanheite, 15c eugenite, 15d moschellandsbergite; 20a weishanite, 20b goldamalgam*; 25 potarite, 30 leadamalgam
  - 01.AE Iron-chromium family: 05 kamacite? (iron var.), 05 iron, 05 chromium; 10 antitaenite*, 10 taenite, 10 tetrataenite; 15 chromferide, 15 wairauite, 15 ferchromide; 20 awaruite, 25 jedwabite
  - 01.AF Platinum-group elements: 05 osmium, 05 rutheniridosmine, 05 ruthenium; 10 palladium, 10 iridium, 10 rhodium, 10 platinum
  - 01.AG PGE-metal alloys: 05 garutiite, 05 hexaferrum; 10 atokite, 10 zvyagintsevite, 10 rustenburgite; 15 taimyrite, 15 tatyanaite; 20 paolovite; 25 plumbopalladinite, 25 stannopalladinite; 30 cabriite; 35 chengdeite, 35 isoferroplatinum; 40 ferronickelplatinum, 40 tetraferroplatinum, 40 tulameenite; 45 hongshiite*, 45 skaergaardite; 50 yixunite, 55 damiaoite, 60 niggliite, 65 bortnikovite, 70 nielsenite
- 01.B Metallic carbides, silicides, nitrides and phosphides
  - 01.BA Carbides: 05 cohenite; 10 isovite, 10 haxonite; 15 tongbaite; 20 khamrabaevite, 20 niobocarbide, 20 tantalcarbide; 25 qusongite, 30 yarlongite
  - 01.BB Silicides: zangboite; 05 mavlyanovite, 05 suessite; 10 perryite, 15 fersilicite*, 20 ferdisilicite*, 25 luobusaite, 30 gupeiite, 35 hapkeite, 40 xifengite
  - 01.BC Nitrides: 05 roaldite, 10 siderazot, 15 carlsbergite, 15 osbornite
  - 01.BD Phosphides: 05 schreibersite, 05 nickelphosphide; 10 barringerite, 10 monipite; 15 allabogdanite, 15 florenskyite, 15 andreyivanovite; 20 melliniite
- 01.C Metalloids and nonmetals
  - 01.CA Arsenic group elements: 05 bismuth, 05 native antimony, 05 arsenic, 05 stibarsen; 10 arsenolamprite, 10 pararsenolamprite; 15 paradocrasite
  - 01.CB Carbon-silicon family: 05a graphite, 05b chaoite, 05c fullerite; 10a diamond, 10b lonsdaleite, 15 silicon
  - 01.CC Sulfur-selenium-iodine: 05 sulfur, 05 rosickyite; 10 tellurium, 10 selenium
- 01.D Nonmetallic carbides and nitrides
  - 01.DA Nonmetallic carbides: 05 moissanite
  - 01.DB Nonmetallic nitrides: 05 nierite, 10 sinoite
- 01.X Unclassified Strunz elements (metals and intermetallic alloys; metalloids and nonmetals; carbides, silicides, nitrides, phosphides)
  - 01.XX Unknown: 00 hexamolybdenum, 00 tantalum*, 00 brownleeite

== See also ==
- Free element
- Gangue
- Native metal
- Native state
