= Garutiite =

Rare mineral

General
- Category: Osmium group
- Formula: (Ni,Fe,Ir)
- IMA symbol: Gar
- Strunz classification: 1.AG.05
- Dana classification: 1.1.17.8
- Crystal system: Hexagonal
- Crystal class: 6/mmm (6/m 2/m 2/m) - Dihexagonal Dipyramidal
- Space group: P63/mmc
- Unit cell: 26.86 Å^{3} (Calculated from Unit Cell)

Identification
- Formula mass: 89.9 g/mol
- Color: Gray to gray-black
- Cleavage: None Observed
- Fracture: Uneven to hackly
- Tenacity: Slightly ductile; tough
- Mohs scale hardness: 4.5 - 5.5
- Luster: Metallic
- Streak: Gray to black metallic
- Diaphaneity: Opaque
- Specific gravity: 11.33 (Calculated)
- Density: 11.33 g/cm^{3} (Calculated)
- Pleochroism: Non-pleochroic
- Ultraviolet fluorescence: Non fluorescence
- Solubility: Insoluble
- Common impurities: Fe,Ir
- Other characteristics: Discovered in 2009

Garutiite is a rare mineral and is in the platinum group alloys. It's also part of the osmium group. It was discovered in the Loma Peguera deposit, Falcondo Mines, Bonao, Monseñor Nouel Province, Dominican Republic in 2009. It was named in honor of Giorgio Garuti (born 1945), professor at the University of Leoben, Austria, in recognition of his contributions to the understanding of the mineralogy of platinum-group elements.

== Discovery ==
Garutiite was found accidentally in a broader investigation of platinum group minerals associated with ophiolitic chromitites. These chromitites were found inside massive strongly altered ultramafic rocks of the Loma Caribe peridotite in the Cordillera Central of the Dominican Republic. A 3.3 kg block of chromitite was taken from a pod about 10 km south-east of the town of Bonao, was broken apart in the laboratory using electric pulse disaggregation and then separated into heavy-mineral grains by hydroseparation. More than 300 tiny grains between 20 and 120 μm were found. Most of them were platinum-group elements minerals, but about twenty grains of a nickel–iron–iridium (alloy) with a special hexagonal structure were different from any known mineral and were later named garutiite.

The name and species were approved by the Commission on New Minerals in 2010 by the Nomenclature and Classification of the International Mineralogical Association (IMA 2008-055). Garutiite is on display in the Mineralogical Museum of Leoben, Austria (catalogue no. 8241), and the main reference grain is stored at the Canadian Museum of Nature in Ottawa (specimen CMNMC 86089).

== Occurrence and geologic setting ==
Garutiite is known from chromitite bodies related to the Loma Peguera lateritic nickel deposit in the central part of the Loma Caribe peridotite, Cordillera Central, Dominican Republic. The host rocks are part of an ophiolite complex and are mainly harzburgite with smaller amounts of dunite and lherzolite. These rocks have been strongly changed by hydration to form serpentinite and by weathering near the surface, which produced a nickel-rich laterite profile. Garutiite is found in heavy-mineral concentrates made from massive chromitite that contains more than 95 vol % chromite, with rims of iron-rich chromite and small amounts of chlorite- and mineral of the serpentine group between the chromite crystals.

In these concentrates, garutiite forms complex intergrowths with platinum-group minerals and Fe–Ni alloys. It occurs with hexaferrum (hexagonal native iron), awaruite, iron-rich chromite, native ruthenium, laurite, irarsite and several Ru–Os–Ir–Fe and Pt–Ni–Fe–Ir alloys, as well as phases close to Pt(Ni,Fe)_{3}, (Fe,Ru,Ni,Os,Ir,Co)_{2}S and RhNiAs. The grains are usually surrounded by alteration minerals of the chlorite and serpentine groups and by iron-rich chromite. Their irregular shapes, strong porosity and zoning, and their close link to alteration minerals suggest that garutiite did not form directly from molten rock but developed later at relatively low temperatures during the hydration (serpentinization) and weathering (lateritization) of the ultramafic rocks.

As of 2025 Garutiite has only been confirmed from the Loma Peguera chromitites at the Falcondo nickel mine, although analyses of Ni–Fe–Ir alloys from other ophiolitic chromitites, such as those in the Vourinos complex in Greece, fall inside or close to the garutiite composition range and may represent another location.

== Physical and optical properties ==
Garutiite occurs as rounded, irregular and often grape-like (botryoidal) grains that are usually 10–60 μm across. The largest grains reach about 110 μm. Grains may consist of a single phase or of several phases grown together and can show thin, layered (lamellar) textures in back-scattered electron images. To the naked eye and under a microscope it appears grey to grey-black with a bright metallic lustre and is opaque in reflected light. Because the grains are very small, porous and intergrown with other minerals, cleavage, hardness, tenacity and fracture could not be measured in a reliable way.

In plane-polarized reflected light, garutiite looks white to slightly cream-coloured and shows only very weak changes in brightness when the microscope stage is rotated, meaning that its optical anisotropy is very weak. No pleochroism, bireflectance or internal reflections have been observed. Reflectance measurements in air for the type material give values of 63.8 % at 470 nm, 65.9 % at 546 nm, 67.0 % at 589 nm and 68.0 % at 650 nm, which are similar to other alloys of the osmium group. The density could not be measured directly, but a value calculated from the chemical composition and unit-cell parameters is D which equals 11.33(1) g·cm^{−3}. Raman spectroscopy of garutiite shows a nearly featureless spectrum between 150 and 2000 cm^{−1}, which is typical for minerals with mainly metallic bonding.

== Chemistry ==
Electron-microprobe analyses show that nickel (Ni), iron (Fe) and iridium (Ir) are the main elements in garutiite. Platinum (Pt) is always present in smaller amounts, and cobalt (Co), copper (Cu), ruthenium (Ru), rhodium (Rh) and osmium (Os) occur in minor amounts. The average composition of 42 analyses from 27 grains at the type locality is Ni 27.91 wt %, Fe 19.94 wt %, Ir 43.78 wt %, Pt 6.98 wt %, Co 0.55 wt %, Cu 0.43 wt %, Ru 0.50 wt %, Rh 0.74 wt % and Os 0.67 wt %. This gives the empirical formula (Ni_{0.421}Fe_{0.316}Ir_{0.202}Pt_{0.032}Co_{0.008}Cu_{0.006}Rh_{0.006}Ru_{0.004}Os_{0.003})_{Σ1} and the simplified formula (Ni,Fe,Ir). Some grains show clear chemical zoning. In these, platinum can be much richer and may locally reach about 25 wt % Pt, and in a few analyses Pt is more abundant than Ir.

Minerals of the osmium group have only one crystallographic site in their structure. The complex empirical formula of garutiite is therefore interpreted as a solid solution of several possible end-members dominated by Ni, Fe and Ir rather than as a sign of uncertainty in the structure itself. When compositions are plotted on Ni–Fe–Ir and Ni–Fe–(Ir + Pt) ternary diagrams, the data form a continuous trend between garutiite and hexaferrum and suggest that hexagonal polymorphs of native Ir and Pt may also occur in nature.

== Crystal structure and classification ==
Powder X-ray diffraction data show that garutiite is hexagonal with space group P6_{3}/mmc and unit-cell parameters a = 2.6941(4) Å, c = 4.2731(6) Å, V = 26.86(1) Å^{3} and Z = 2. Its diffraction pattern closely matches those of hexaferrum, osmium and ruthenium. This confirms that garutiite belongs to the osmium group of native-element alloys and represents a hexagonal polymorph of native nickel. In this structure a single atomic site is occupied by a disordered mixture of Ni, Fe, Ir, Pt and minor other metals.

Later studies of hexaferrum and similar iron–nickel–iridium (Fe–Ni–Ir) alloys have used garutiite as an example of hexagonal Fe–Ni alloys that contain iridium and form when chromitite is altered. These studies support the idea that garutiite is a secondary mineral that formed at relatively low temperatures, after the original magma had cooled and the rocks had already solidified.

== See also ==
- Serpentinization
