= Native metal =

Form of metal

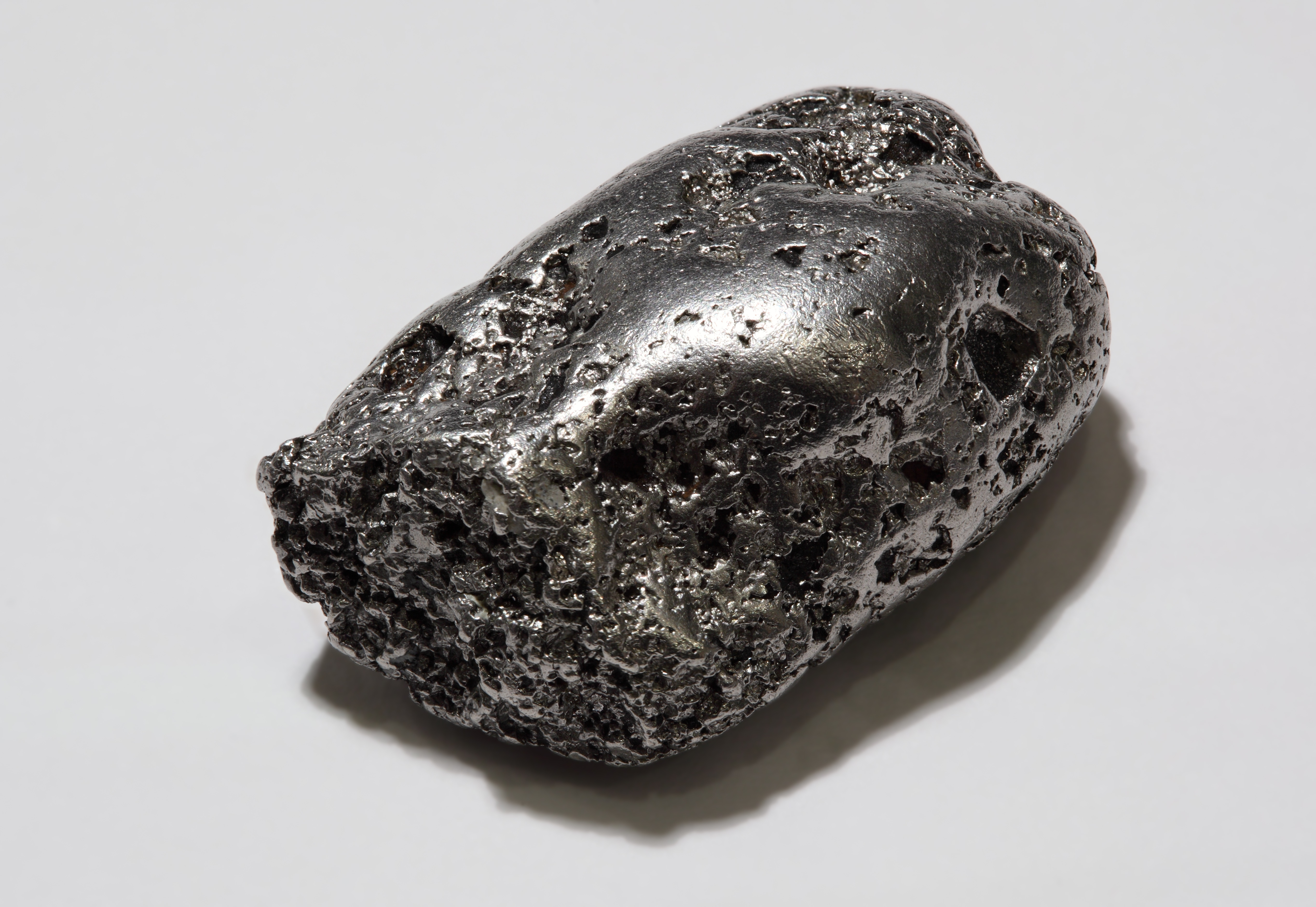
Nugget of native platinum (Kondyor mine, Khabarovsk Krai, Russia)

A native metal is any metal that is found pure in its metallic form in nature. Metals that can be found as native deposits singly or in alloys include antimony, arsenic, bismuth, cadmium, chromium, cobalt, indium, iron, manganese, molybdenum, nickel, niobium, rhenium, tantalum, tellurium, tin, titanium, tungsten, vanadium, and zinc, as well as the gold group (gold, copper, lead, aluminium, mercury, silver) and the platinum group (platinum, iridium, osmium, palladium, rhodium, ruthenium). Among the alloys found in native state have been osmiridium, electrum, silver-mercury amalgam, and gold-mercury amalgam.

Only gold, silver, copper and the platinum group occur native in large amounts. Over geological time scales, very few metals can resist natural weathering processes like oxidation, so mainly the less reactive metals such as gold and platinum are found as native metals. The others usually occur as isolated pockets where a natural chemical process reduces a common compound or ore of the metal, leaving the pure metal behind as small flakes or inclusions.

Metals are not the only type of chemical element that can occur in the native state. Non-metallic elements occurring in the native state include carbon, sulfur, and selenium. Silicon, a semi-metal, has rarely been found in the native state as small inclusions in gold.

Native metals were prehistoric humans' only access to metal, since the process of extracting metals from their ores (smelting) is thought to have been discovered around 6500 BC. However, native metals could be found only in impractically small amounts, so while copper and iron were known well before the Copper Age and Iron Age, they did not have a large impact until smelting appeared.

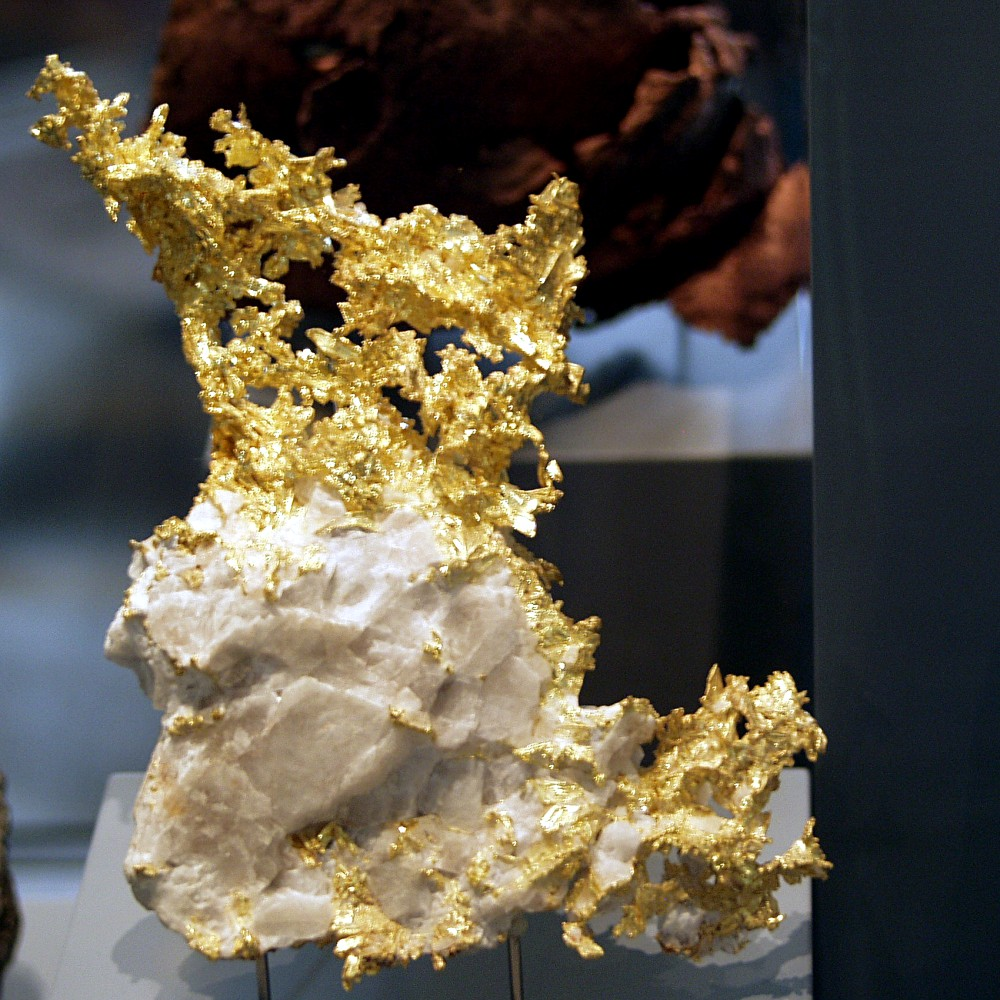
Native gold partially embedded in quartz gangue

== Occurrence ==
=== Gold ===
Most gold is mined as native metal and can be found as nuggets, veins or wires of gold in a rock matrix, or fine grains of gold, mixed in with sediments or bound within rock. The iconic image of gold mining for many is gold panning, which is a method of separating flakes and nuggets of pure gold from river sediments due to their great density. Native gold is the predominant gold mineral on the earth. It is sometimes found alloyed with silver and/or other metals, but true gold compound minerals are uncommon, mainly a handful of selenides and tellurides.

=== Silver ===
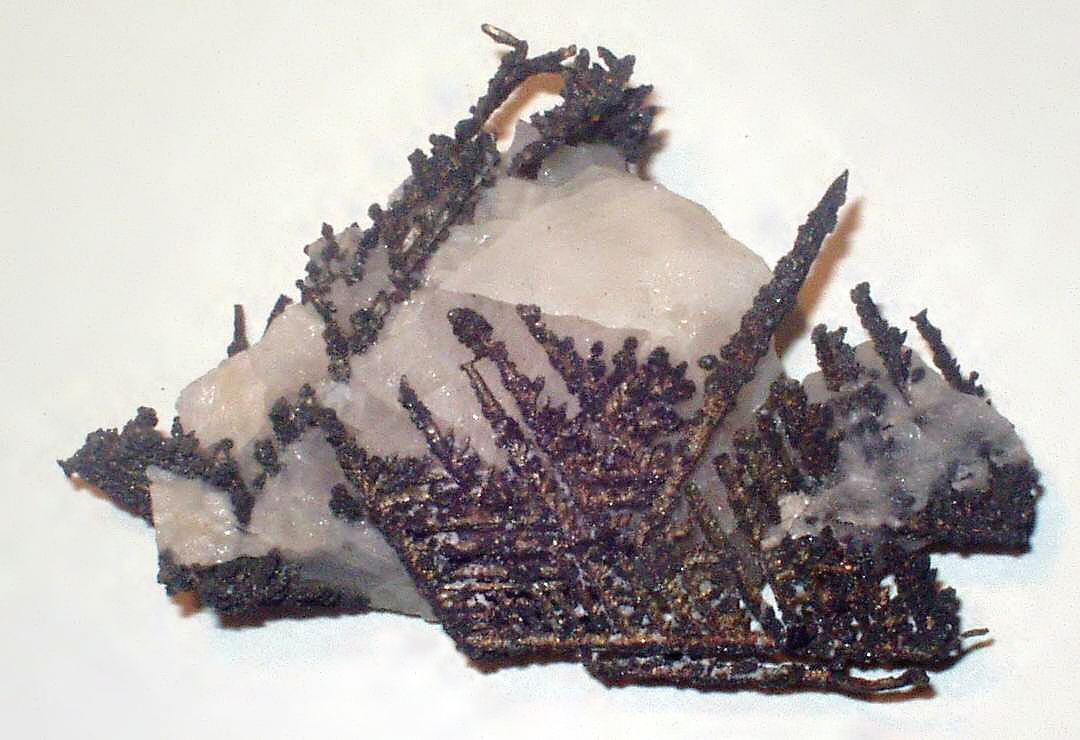
Silver with quartz matrix (5 x 3 cm)

Native silver occurs as elongated dendritic coatings or irregular masses. It may also occur as cubic, octahedral, or dodecahedral crystals. It may occur alloyed with gold as electrum. It often occurs with silver sulfide and sulfosalt minerals. Various amalgams of silver and mercury or other metals and mercury do occur rarely as minerals in nature. An example is the mineral eugenite (Ag_{11}Hg_{2}) and related forms. Silver nuggets, wires, and grains are relatively common, but there are also a large number of silver compound minerals owing to silver being more reactive than gold.

=== Platinum group ===
Natural alloys of the platinum group metals include: native osmium (Os,Ir,Ru), rutheniridosmine (Ir,Os,Ru), ruthenium (Ru,Ir), palladium (Pd,Pt), platinum Pt, and rhodium (Rh,Pt). In addition, gold, copper, iron, mercury, tin, and lead may occur in alloys of this group. As with gold, salts and other compounds of the platinum group metals are rare; native platinum and related metals and alloys are the predominant minerals bearing these metals. These metals occur associated with ultramafic intrusions, and placer deposits derived from those intrusions.

=== Copper ===
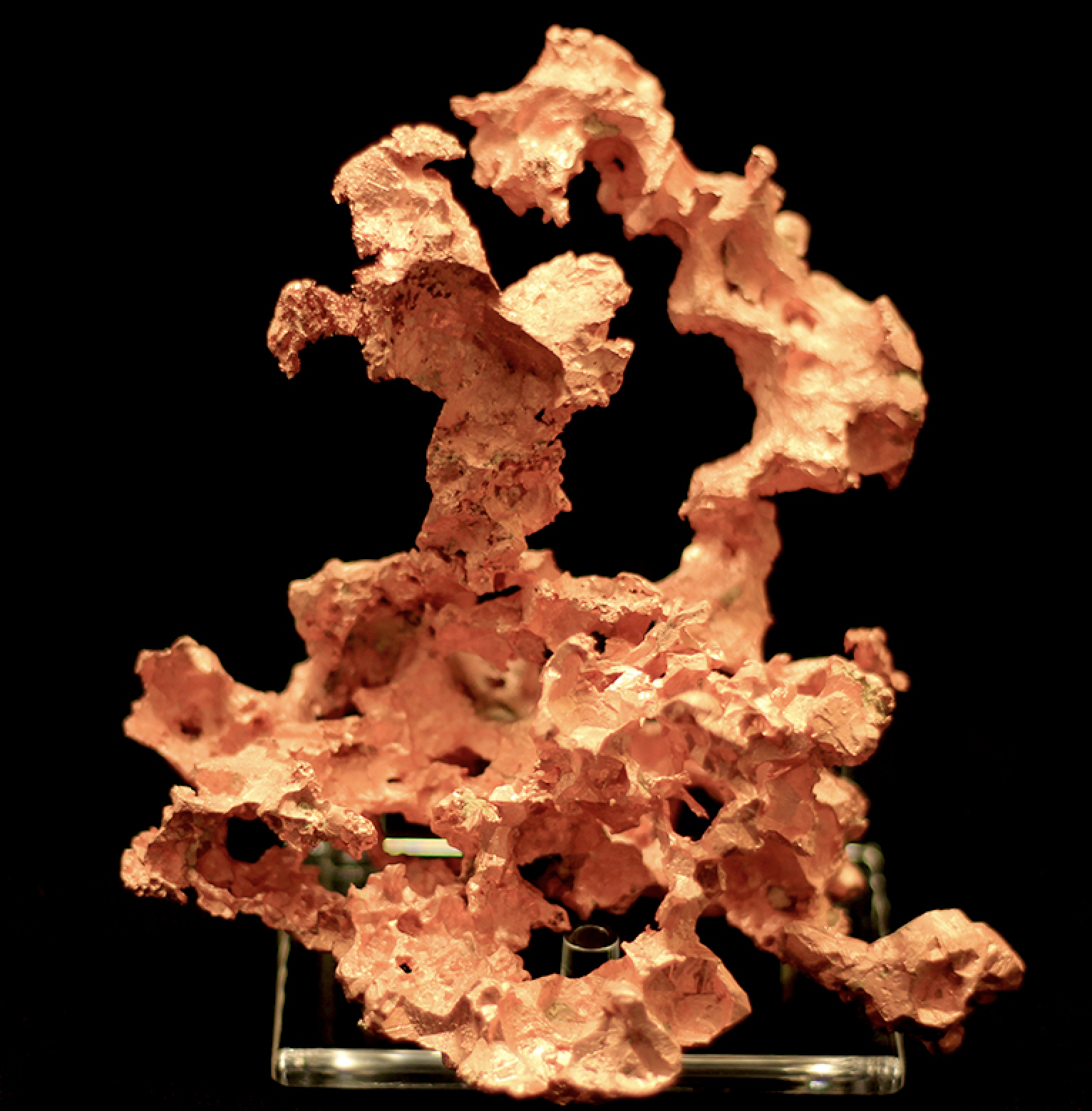
Native copper specimen isolated from mineral matrix. From Keweenaw Peninsula, MI. Iroquois Copper Mine.

Native copper has been historically mined as an early source of the metal. The term Old Copper Complex is used to describe an ancient North American civilization that utilized native copper deposits for weapons, tools, and decorative objects. This society existed around Lake Superior, where they found sources of native copper and mined them between 6000 and 3000 BC. Copper would have been especially useful to ancient humans as it was much stronger than gold, hard enough to be made into useful items such as fishhooks and woodworking tools, but still soft enough to be easily shaped, unlike meteoric iron.

The same deposits of native copper on the Keweenaw Peninsula and Isle Royale were later mined commercially. From 1845 until 1887, the Michigan Copper Country was the leading producer of copper in the United States. Masses of native copper weighing hundreds of tons were sometimes found in the mines.

The spectrum of copper minerals closely resembles that of silver, ranging from oxides of its multiple oxidation states through sulfides and silicates to halides and chlorates, iodates, nitrates and others. Natural alloys of copper (particularly with silver; the two metals can also be found in separate but co-mingled masses) are also found.

=== Iron, nickel and cobalt ===
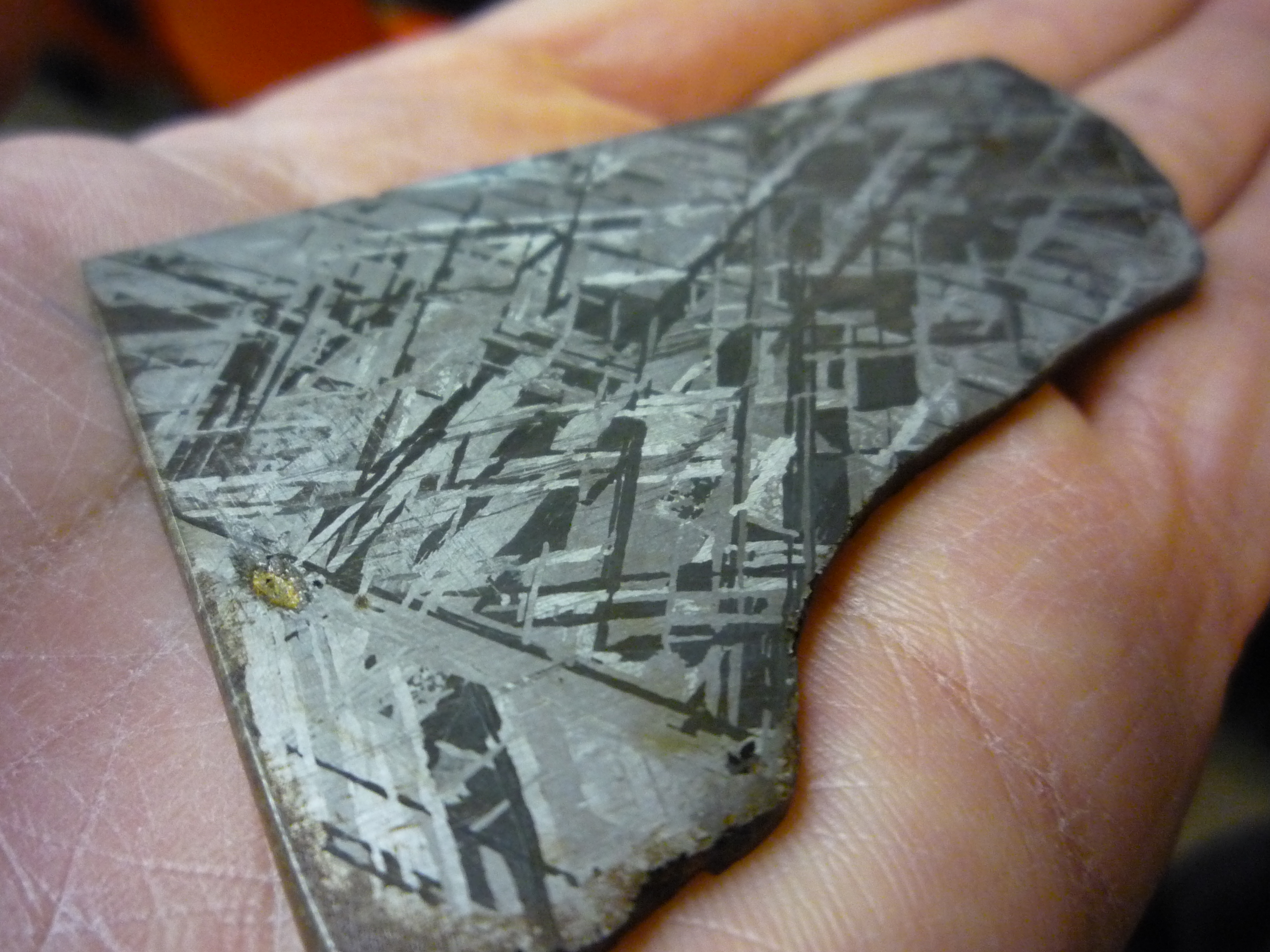
Nickel iron meteorite

Telluric iron (Earth born) is very rare, with only one major deposit known in the world, located on or near Disko Island in Greenland. Most of the native iron on earth is actually not in fact "native", in the traditional sense, to Earth. It mainly comes from iron-nickel meteorites that formed millions of years ago but were preserved from chemical attack by the vacuum of space, and fell to the earth a relatively short time ago. Metallic meteorites are composed primarily of the iron-nickel alloys: taenite (high nickel content) and kamacite (low nickel content). However, there are a few areas on earth where truly native iron can be found.

Native nickel has been described in serpentinite due to hydrothermal alteration of ultramafic rocks in New Caledonia and elsewhere.

Metallic cobalt has been reported in the Canadian Lorraine Mine, Cobalt-Gowganda region, the Timiskaming District, Ontario, Canada, and in the Aidyrlya gold deposit in Orenburgskaya Oblast of the Southern Urals.

=== Others ===
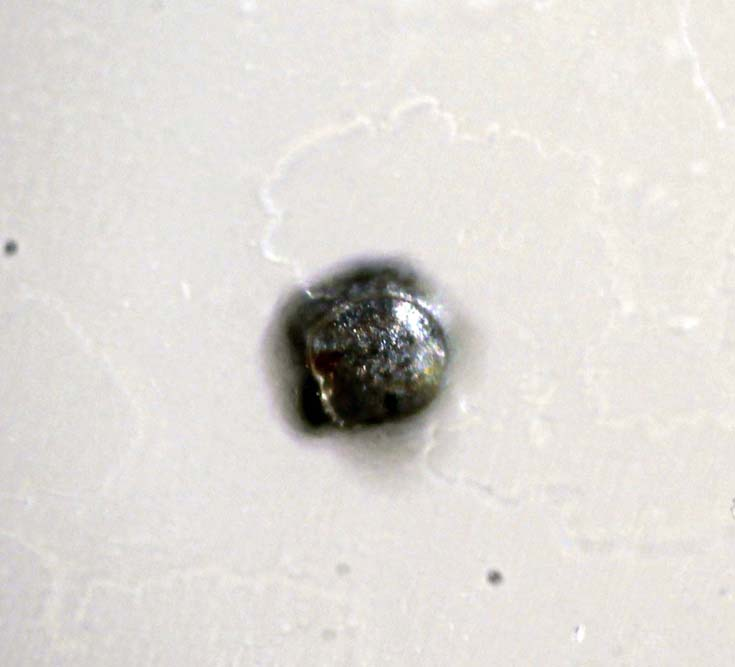
Tiny speck of native aluminium from Bulla Island, Azerbaijan

All other native metals occur only in small quantities or are found in geologically special regions. For example, metallic cadmium was only found at two locations including the Vilyuy River basin in Siberia. Native molybdenum has been found in lunar regolith and in the Koryakskii volcano in Kamchatka Oblast of Russia. Elsewhere in this region native indium, aluminium, tantalum, tellurium, and other metals have been reported. Native lead is quite rare but somewhat more widespread, as are tin, mercury, arsenic, antimony, and bismuth.

Native chromium has been found in small grains in Sichuan, China and other locations.

== See also ==
- Native element mineral
- Noble metal
- Gangue
- Free element
