= Native copper =

Mineral (as opposed to the chemical element)

Copper
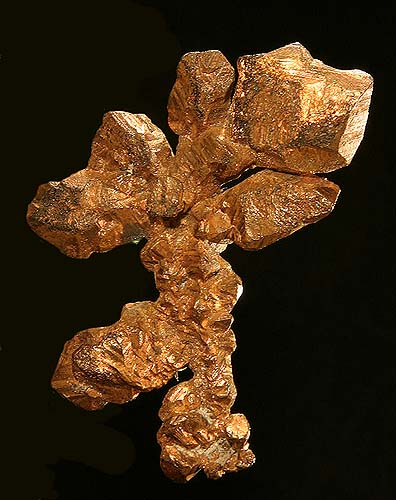
- Native copper from Ray mine, Arizona (specimen 5.25 x 4 x 1 cm)

General
- Category: Native metal
- Formula: Cu
- Strunz classification: 01.AA.05
- Dana classification: 1.1.1.3
- Crystal system: Cubic
- Crystal class: Hexoctahedral (m3̅m); H-M symbol: (4/m 3̅ 2/m)
- Space group: Fm3̅m
- Unit cell: a = 3.615 Å; Z = 4

Identification
- Color: Pale rose on fresh surface, quickly darkens to copper-red; in reflected light, pale rose
- Crystal habit: As cubes, dodecahedra, and as tetrahexahedra; rarely as octahedra and complex combinations. Commonly flattened on {111}, elongated along [001]. Also as irregular distortions, in twisted, wirelike shapes; filiform, arborescent, massive
- Twinning: On {111} to produce simple contact and penetration twins and cyclic groups
- Cleavage: None
- Fracture: Hackly - jagged
- Tenacity: Highly malleable and ductile
- Mohs scale hardness: 2.5–3
- Luster: Metallic
- Streak: Copper-red
- Diaphaneity: Opaque
- Specific gravity: 8.95
- Solubility: Soluble in nitric acid
- Other characteristics: Tarnishes to black or green in air.

Native copper is an uncombined form of copper that occurs as a natural mineral. Copper is one of the few metallic elements to occur in native form, although it most commonly occurs in oxidized states and mixed with other elements. Native copper was an important ore used by pre-historic peoples.

Native copper typically occurs as irregular masses and fracture fillings, and rarely as isometric cubic and octahedral crystals. It has a reddish, orangish, and/or brownish color on fresh surfaces, but typically is weathered to a state of verdigris and coated with a green or blue-green tarnish or patina of copper(II) carbonate. Its specific gravity is 8.9 and Mohs hardness is 2.5–3.

The mines of the Keweenaw native copper deposits of Upper Michigan were major copper producers in the 19th and early 20th centuries, and are the largest deposits of native copper in the world. Native Americans mined copper on a small scale at this and many other locations, and evidence using isotopic analysis exists of copper trading routes throughout North America among native peoples. The first commercial mines in the Keweenaw Peninsula (nicknamed the "Copper Country" and "Copper Island") opened in the 1840s. Isle Royale in western Lake Superior was also a site of many tons of native copper. Some of it was extracted by native peoples, but only one of several commercial attempts at mining turned a profit there. A geological record of native copper being dragged by a glacier and deposited on the west branch of the Ontonagon River up river from Lake Superior is seen in the Ontonagon Boulder in the possession of the Department of Mineral Sciences, National Museum of Natural History, Smithsonian Institution.

Another major native copper deposit is in Coro Coro, Bolivia.

== Gallery ==
Specimens from notable native copper localities worldwide

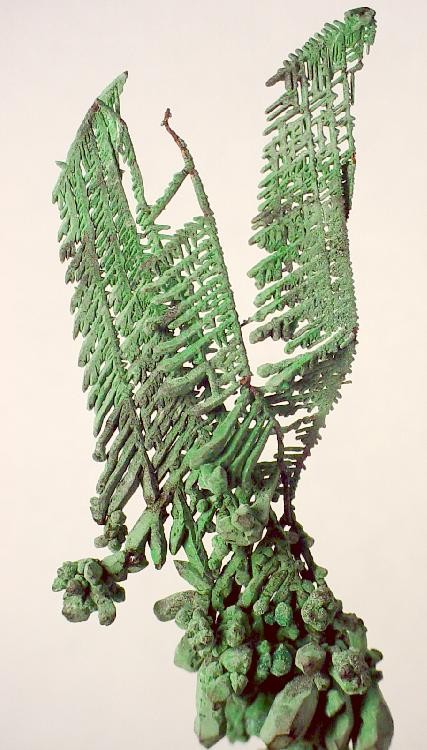
Dendritic native copper covered in verdigris from Broken Hill, New South Wales, Australia (6.5 cm)

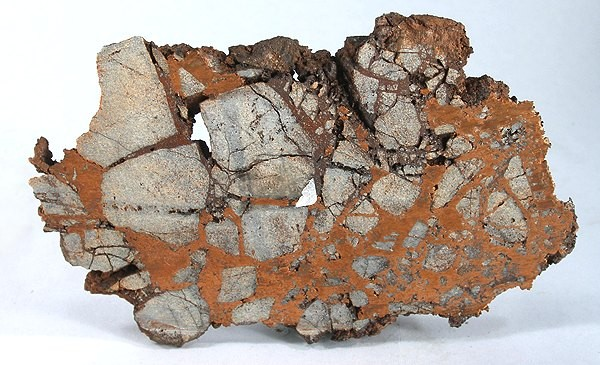
Native copper cementing host rock, Ray Mine, Arizona (11.5 x 7.4 x 0.7 cm)

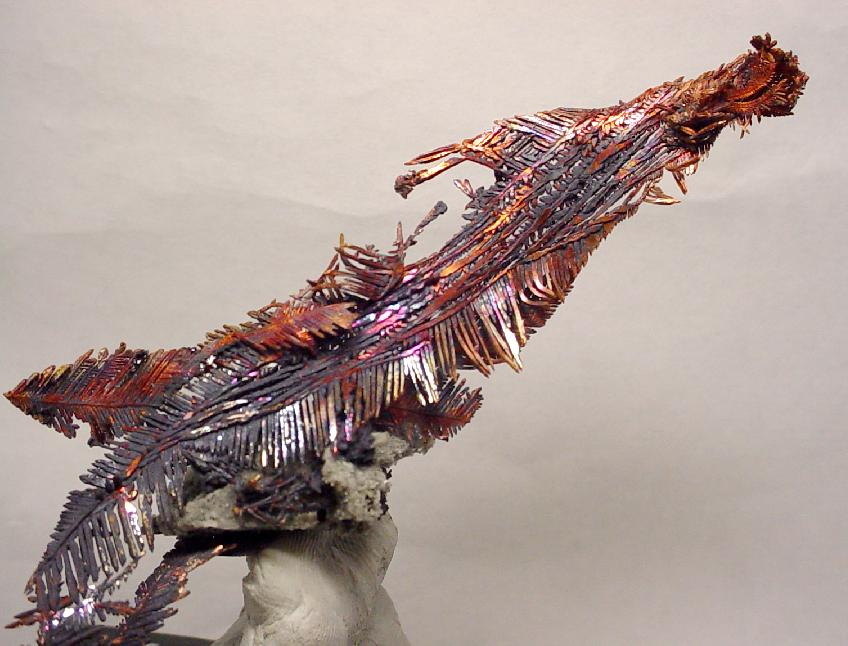
Dendritic native copper from the Itauz Mine, Kazakhstan (8 x 3 x 1.5 cm)

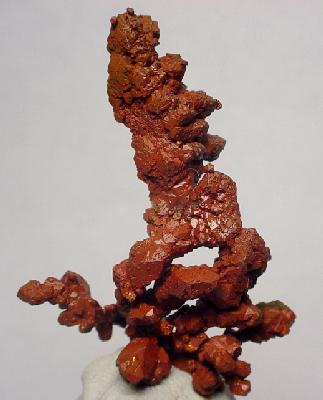
Tsumeb, Namibia (3 x 1.3 x 0.5 cm)

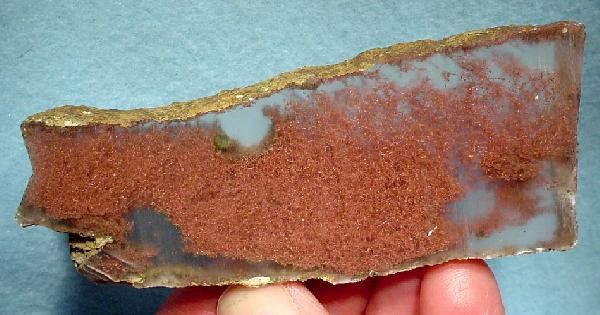
Dendritic native copper encased in transparent gypsum, Mission Mine, Pima County, Arizona, US (9.9 x 4.2 x 1.1 cm)

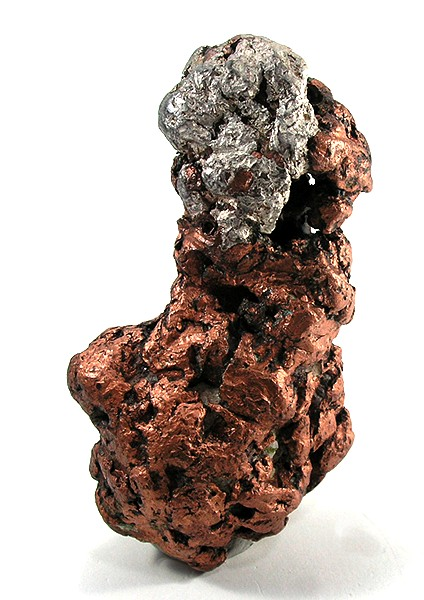
"Halfbreed" copper-silver nugget, Keweenaw County, Michigan, US (8.3 x 4.6 x 2 cm)

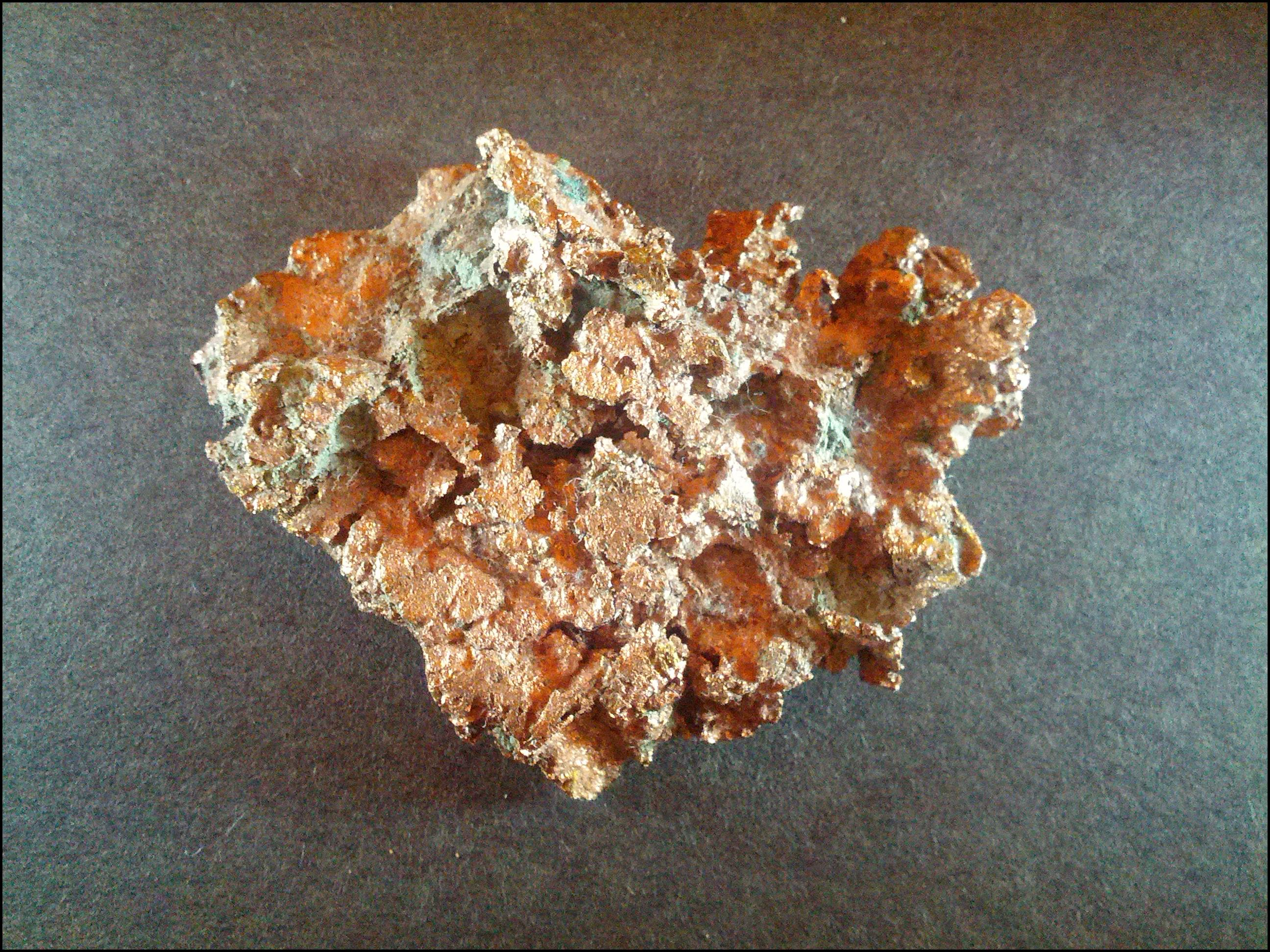
Keweenaw Peninsula, Michigan, US (6.4 cm)

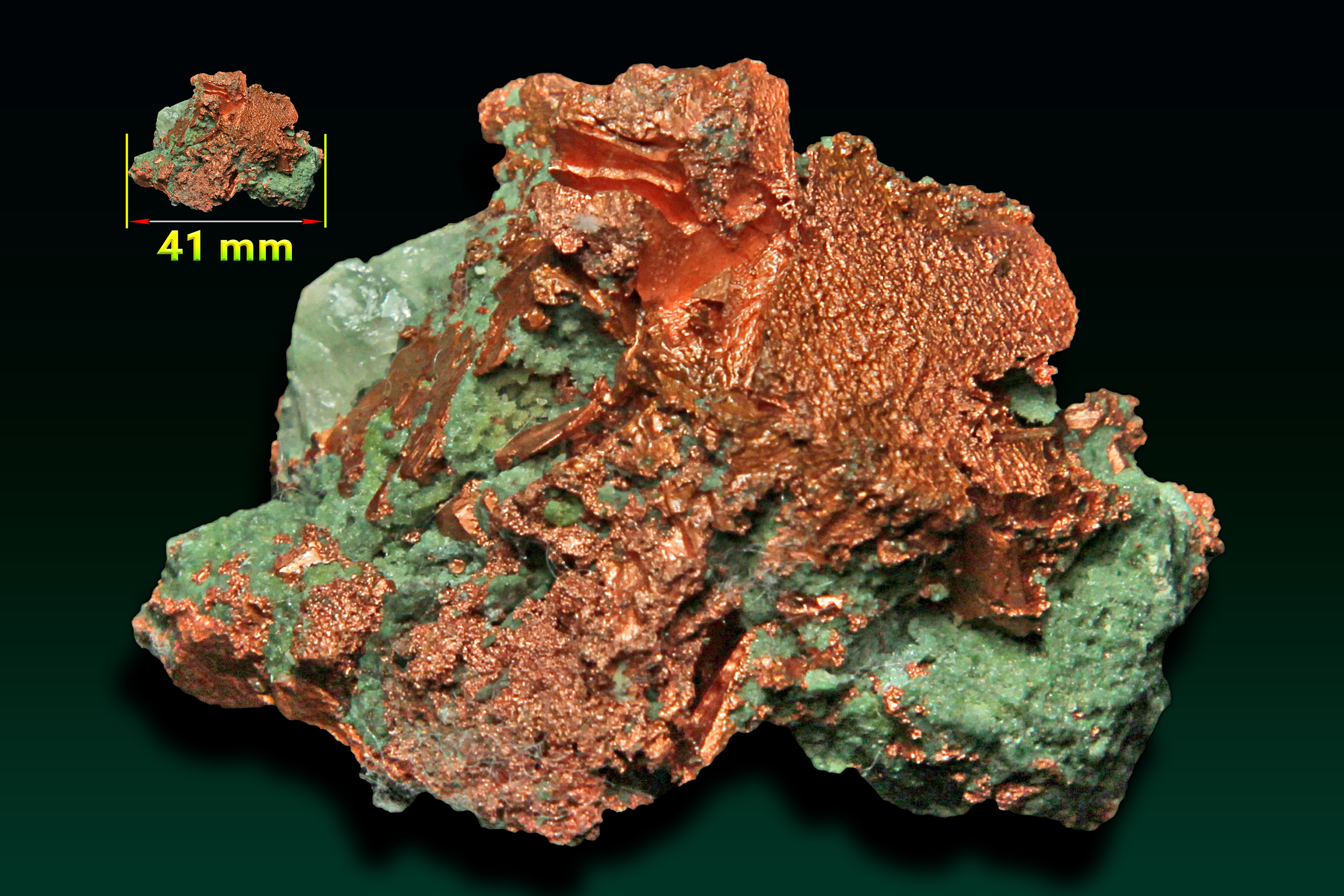
Native copper with verdigris, Keweenaw Peninsula, Michigan, USA. (4.1 cm)

== See also ==
- Native element mineral – Elements that occur in nature as minerals in uncombined form
- Noble metal – Metallic elements that are nearly chemically inert
- Gangue – Commercially worthless material that surrounds a wanted mineral in ore
- Native state (metallurgy) – Form of metal
