= Danbaite =

Copper-zinc mineral

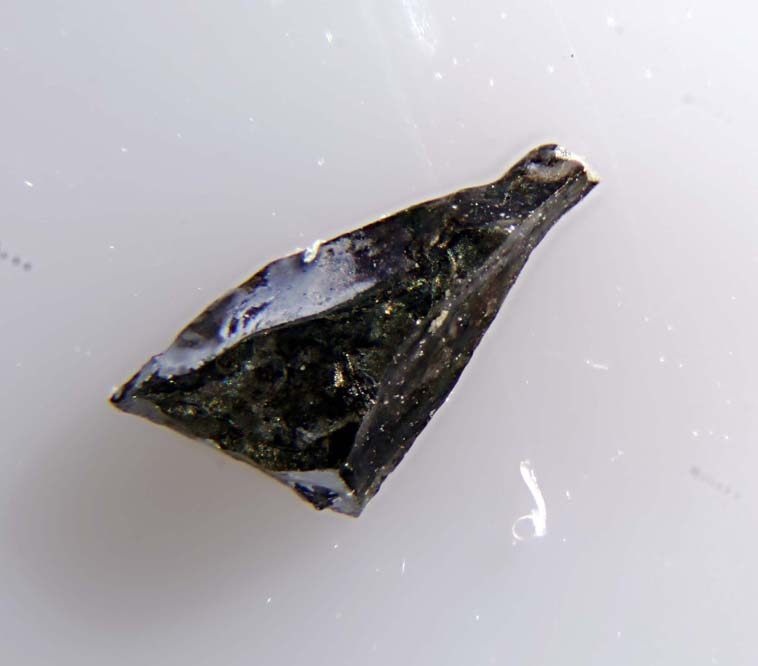

General
- Category: Native element mineral
- Formula: CuZn_{2}
- Strunz classification: 1.AB.10b
- Crystal system: Isometric
- Unit cell: a = 7.7615 Å; Z = 1

Identification
- Color: Silvery white to grayish white
- Cleavage: None
- Mohs scale hardness: 4
- Luster: Metallic
- Streak: bronze
- Diaphaneity: Opaque
- Specific gravity: 7.36

Danbaite is a native element mineral of copper and zinc. It was first described in 1982.
