= Qusongite =

General
- Category: Native element minerals
- Formula: WC
- IMA symbol: Qus
- Strunz classification: 1.BA.25
- Crystal system: Hexagonal
- Crystal class: Ditrigonal dipyramidal (6̅m2); H-M symbol: (6̅ m2)
- Space group: P6̅m2
- Unit cell: a = 2.902, c = 2.831 [Å]; Z = 1

Identification
- Color: black, steel grey

Qusongite is an extremely rare mineral with the simple formula WC, which shows the mineral to be a naturally occurring tungsten carbide. It was found in Luobusa ophiolite, China. This ophiolite is known for many natural reduced compounds, including native metals, diamond, silicides and carbides (e.g., moissanite, natural silicon carbide). Qusongite crystallizes in the hexagonal system, with space group P-6m2.
