= Zhanghengite =

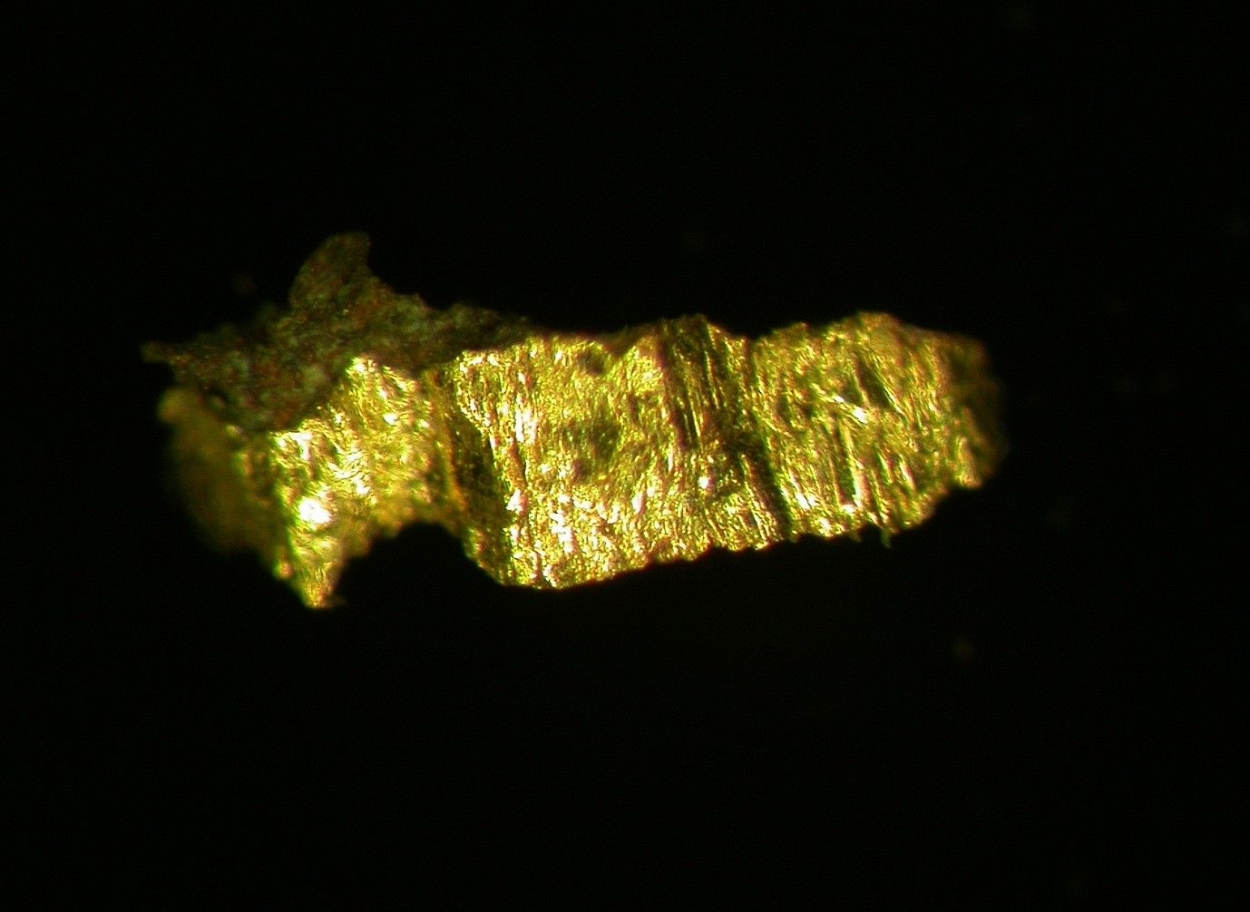
- The rare intermetallide zhanghengite, CuZn, discovered in meteorites, become available now from an old Vietnamese collection. The mineral has nice light-yellow gold-like color and is well visible by unequipped eye.

General
- Category: Native element mineral
- Formula: CuZn
- IMA symbol: Zhg
- Strunz classification: 1.AB.10a
- Crystal system: Isometric
- Crystal class: Hexoctahedral (m3̅m); H-M symbol: (4/m 3̅ 2/m)
- Space group: Im3̅m
- Unit cell: a = 2.95 Å; Z = 1

Identification
- Color: Golden yellow
- Cleavage: None
- Mohs scale hardness: 3.5
- Luster: Metallic
- Streak: bronze
- Diaphaneity: Opaque
- Specific gravity: 3.92
- Ultraviolet fluorescence: Non-fluorescent

Zhanghengite is a mineral consisting of 80% copper and zinc, 10% iron, and 10% chromium and aluminium. Its color is golden yellow. It was discovered in 1986 during the analysis of the Bo Xian meteorite and is named after Zhang Heng, an ancient Chinese astronomer.

== See also ==
- List of minerals named after people
