= Rutheniridosmine =

Naturally occurring mineral alloy of ruthenium, iridium and osmium

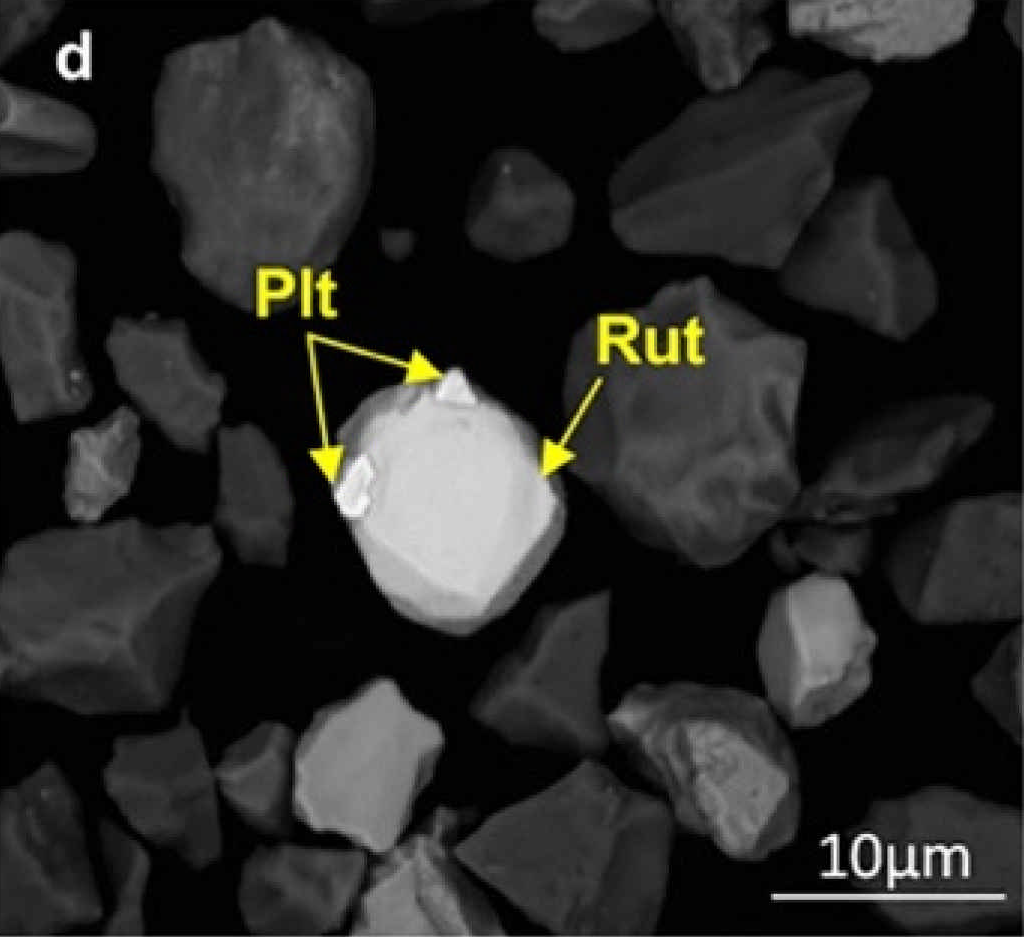
BSE images of PGMs forming polymineralic aggregates - Platarsite and rutheniridosmine

Rutheniridosmine is a naturally occurring mineral alloy of the elements ruthenium, iridium and osmium with the formula of (Ir,Os,Ru). Rutheniridosmine occurs as hexagonal, opaque, silver-white, metallic grains with a Mohs hardness of six. Platinum, palladium, rhodium, iron, and nickel occur as impurities.

Rutheniridosmine occurs in association with sperrylite, hollingworthite, iridarsenite, ruthenarsenite, michenerite, laurite, geversite, moncheite, and chromite.

Type localities include: the Ruby Creek, Spruce Creek, and Bullion mines of British Columbia, Canada and the Horokanai placer deposit, of Kamikawa Subprefecture, Hokkaidō, Japan.
