= Free element =

Chemical elements not bound to other elements or compounds

In chemistry, a free element is a chemical element that is not combined with or chemically bonded to other elements. These may either be chemically inert, or may form bonds with atoms of the same element.

Metals, non-metals, and noble gases can all be found as free elements. Noble gases such as helium and argon are found in the monoatomic state due to the low reactivity of these atoms. Similarly, noble metals such as gold and platinum are also found in the pure state naturally. Non-metals are rarely found as free elements in the solid state — carbon is a notable exception, as it may be found as diamond and graphite. However, they commonly exist as gases, examples of which include molecular oxygen, ozone, and nitrogen, which together make up approximately 99% of the atmosphere. Because of their reactivity, the halogens do not naturally occur in the free elemental state, but they are both widespread and abundant in the form of their halide ions. They are, however, stable in their diatomic forms.

== See also ==
- Native metal
- Noble metal
- Native element mineral
