= Cobalt arsenide =

Names
- Other names arsanylidynecobalt, cobalt monoarsenide

Identifiers
CAS Number	27016-73-5
3D model (JSmol)	Interactive image
ChemSpider	105360
ECHA InfoCard	100.043.775
EC Number	248-168-6
PubChem CID	117908
CompTox Dashboard (EPA)	DTXSID401014640
- InChI: InChI=1S/As.Co Key: NMLUQMQPJQWTFK-UHFFFAOYSA-N
- SMILES: [As]#[Co]

Properties
Chemical formula	CoAs
Molar mass	133.85
Appearance	solid
Density	6.73 g/cm^{3}
Melting point	916 °C (1,681 °F; 1,189 K)

Hazards
- GHS labelling
Pictograms	(GHS06: Toxic) (GHS09: Environmental hazard)
Signal word	Danger
Hazard statements	H301, H331, H410
Precautionary statements	P261, P264, P270, P271, P273, P301+P310, P304+P340, P311, P321, P330, P391, P403+P233, P405, P501
- Except where otherwise noted, data are given for materials in their standard state (at 25 °C [77 °F], 100 kPa). Infobox references

Cobalt arsenide is a binary inorganic compound of cobalt and arsenic with the chemical formula CoAs. The compound occurs naturally as the mineral modderite.

== Structure ==
Cobalt arsenide crystallizes in the orthorhombic system, space group Pnam, parameter a = 0.515 nm, b = 0.596 nm, c = 0.351 nm, Z = 4.

Cobalt arsenide is isostructural with FeAs.

At approximately 6-8 GPa, single crystals of CoAs undergo a transformation to a lower-symmetry phase.

== Use ==
CoAs is used as a semiconductor and in photo optic applications.
