= Hexaferrum =

Phase of iron only stable at high pressures

Figure 1: The epsilon field in the unary iron phase diagram.

Figure 2: Molar volume vs. pressure for ε-Fe at room temperature.

Hexaferrum and epsilon iron (ε-Fe) are synonyms for the hexagonal close-packed (HCP) phase of iron that is stable only at extremely high pressure.

A 1964 study at the University of Rochester mixed 99.8% pure α-iron powder with sodium chloride, and pressed a 0.5-mm diameter pellet between the flat faces of two diamond anvils. The deformation of the NaCl lattice, as measured by x-ray diffraction (XRD), served as a pressure indicator. At a pressure of 13 GPa and room temperature, the body-centered cubic (BCC) ferrite powder transformed to the HCP phase in Figure 1. When the pressure was lowered, ε-Fe transformed back to ferrite (α-Fe) rapidly. A specific volume change of −0.20 cm^{3}/mole ± 0.03 was measured. Hexaferrum, much like austenite, is more dense than ferrite at the phase boundary. A shock wave experiment confirmed the diamond anvil results. Epsilon was chosen for the new phase to correspond with the HCP form of cobalt.

The triple point between the alpha, gamma and epsilon phases in the unary phase diagram of iron has been calculated as T = 770 K and P = 11 GPa, although it was determined at a lower temperature of T = 750 K (477 °C) in Figure 1. The Pearson symbol for hexaferrum is hP2 and its space group is P6_{3}/mmc.

Another study concerning the ferrite-hexaferrum transformation metallographically determined that it is a martensitic rather than equilibrium transformation.

While hexaferrum is purely academic in metallurgical engineering, it may have significance in geology. The pressure and temperature of Earth's iron core are on the order of 150–350 GPa and 3000 ± 1000 °C. An extrapolation of the austenite-hexaferrum phase boundary in Figure 1 suggests hexaferrum could be stable or metastable in Earth's core. For this reason, many experimental studies have investigated the properties of HCP iron under extreme pressures and temperatures. Figure 2 shows the compressional behaviour of ε-iron at room temperature up to a pressure as would be encountered halfway through the outer core of the Earth; there are no points at pressures lower than approximately 6 GPa, because this allotrope is not thermodynamically stable at low pressures but will slowly transform into α-iron.
