= Gangue =

Commercially worthless material that surrounds a wanted mineral in ore

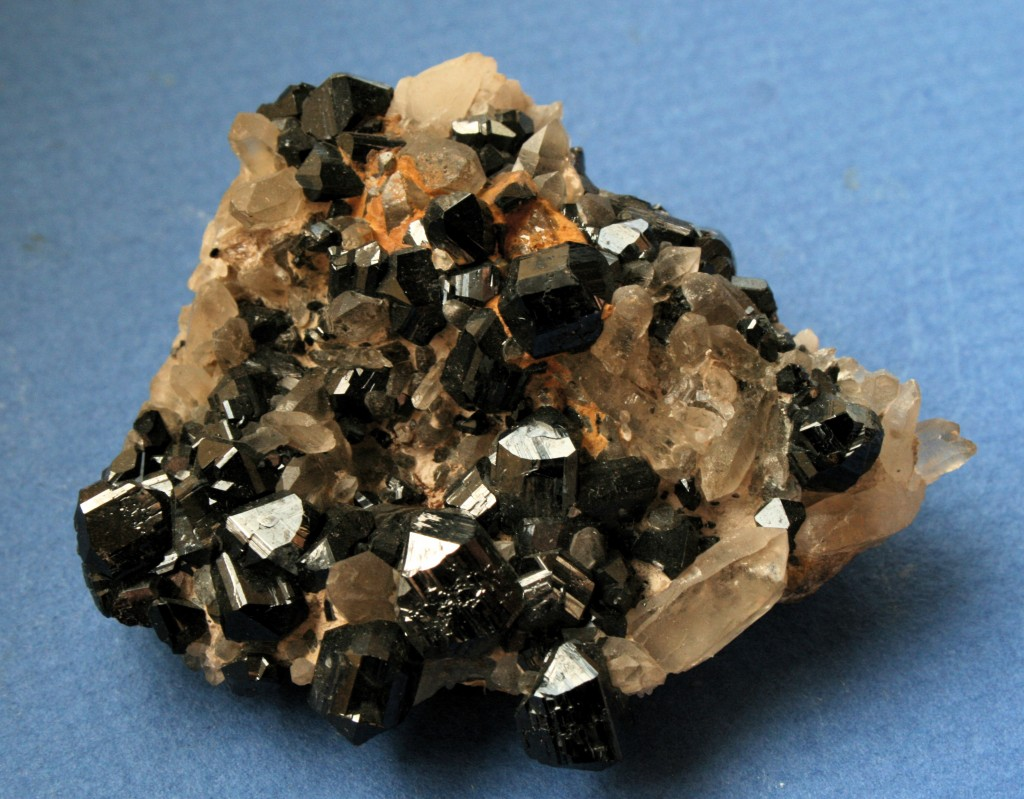
Crystals of cassiterite, a commercially valuable ore mineral, in a matrix of quartz, the gangue

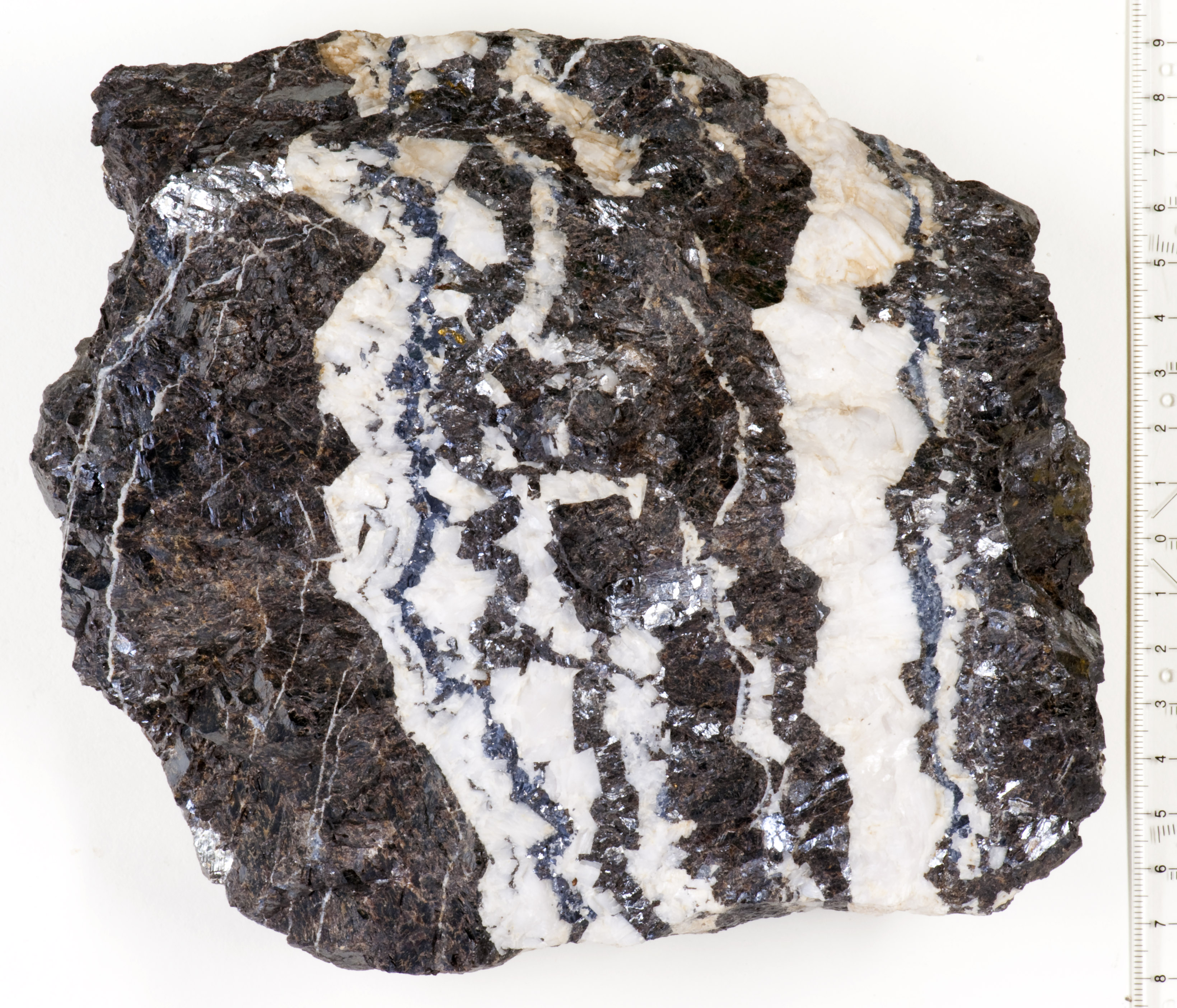
Banded Zn-Pb ore sample with sphalerite (brown) and galena (silver-grey) as main ore minerals and calcite (white) as main gangue mineral

Gangue (/ɡæŋ/), or veinstone, is the commercially worthless material that surrounds, or is closely mixed with, a wanted mineral in an ore deposit. It is thus distinct from overburden, which is the waste rock or materials overlying an ore or mineral body that is displaced during mining without being processed.

The separation of valuable mineral from gangue minerals is known as mineral processing, mineral dressing, or ore dressing. It is a necessary, and often significant, aspect of mining. It can be a complicated process, depending on the nature of the minerals involved. For example, galena, an ore of lead, is usually found in large pieces within its gangue, so it does not normally need extensive processing to remove it; but cassiterite, the chief ore mineral of tin, is usually disseminated as very small crystals throughout its gangue, so when it is mined from hard rock, the ore-bearing rock first needs to be crushed very finely, and then has to be subjected to sophisticated processes to separate the ore.

For any particular ore deposit, and at any particular point in time, the concentration of the wanted mineral(s) in the gangue material will determine whether it is commercially viable to mine that deposit. The ease with which the wanted mineral(s) can be separated from gangue minerals also plays an important part. Early mining ventures, having relatively unsophisticated methods, often could not achieve a high degree of separation, so large quantities of minerals found their way into the waste mineral dumps of mines. As the value of a mineral increases, or when new and cheaper means of processing the ore to extract the wanted mineral(s) are introduced, it may become worthwhile to rework such old dumps to retrieve the wanted minerals they still contain.

== Environmental impact of gangue minerals in mine tailings ==
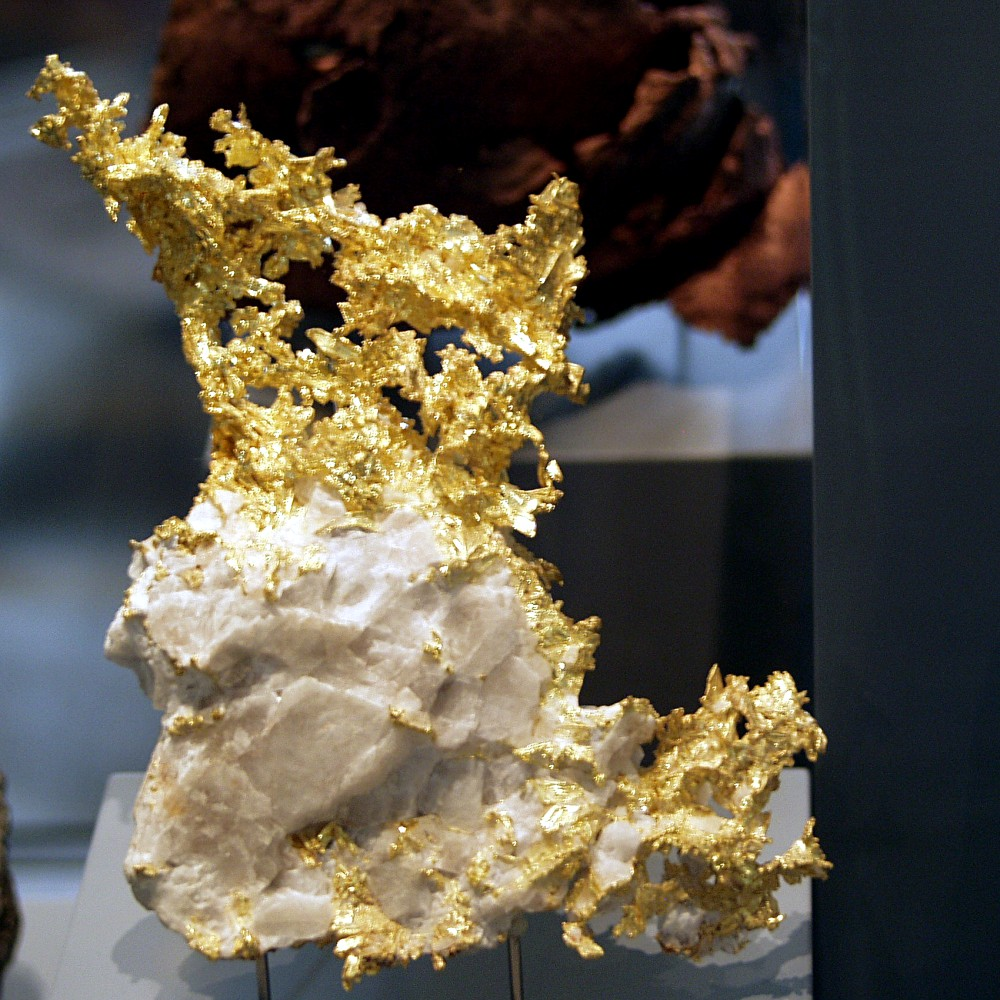
Native gold partially contained within a quartz gangue, visible at lower left.

Gangue minerals, once separated by mineral dressing processes of (most of) the valuable ore minerals and dumped in mine tailings may be a significant environmental impact. In particular, oxidation of pyrite, a common gangue mineral, is one of the main sources of acid mine drainage.

== Re-use ==
Waste minerals that were once discarded as gangue are sometimes salvaged and used commercially. For example, in copper mines in the nineteenth century the mineral arsenopyrite was dumped until arsenic compounds became popular as insecticides later in the century.

Starting in the second half of the 20th century the environmental benefits of recycling gangue gained prominence. For example, in 2002, about 130 million tons of gangue were produced per year from coal mining in China. This, mixed with the 60 million tons of coal mud also produced, could be used for power generation; and the coal mining gangue could be combined with coal fly ash to produce building materials. The estimated cost of such projects would be up to 4 billion yuan, but would be expected to save just over 4 million tons of standard coal per year.

== See also ==
- Froth flotation – Process for selectively separating of hydrophobic materials from hydrophilic
- Magnetic separation – Process of separating components of mixtures by using magnets
- Vanning – Ore dressing in which ores are washed on a shovel
- Extractive metallurgy – Ore extraction material science
- Mineral processing – Process of separating commercially valuable minerals from their ores
