= Patio process =

Metallurgical process: extraction of silver by amalgamation

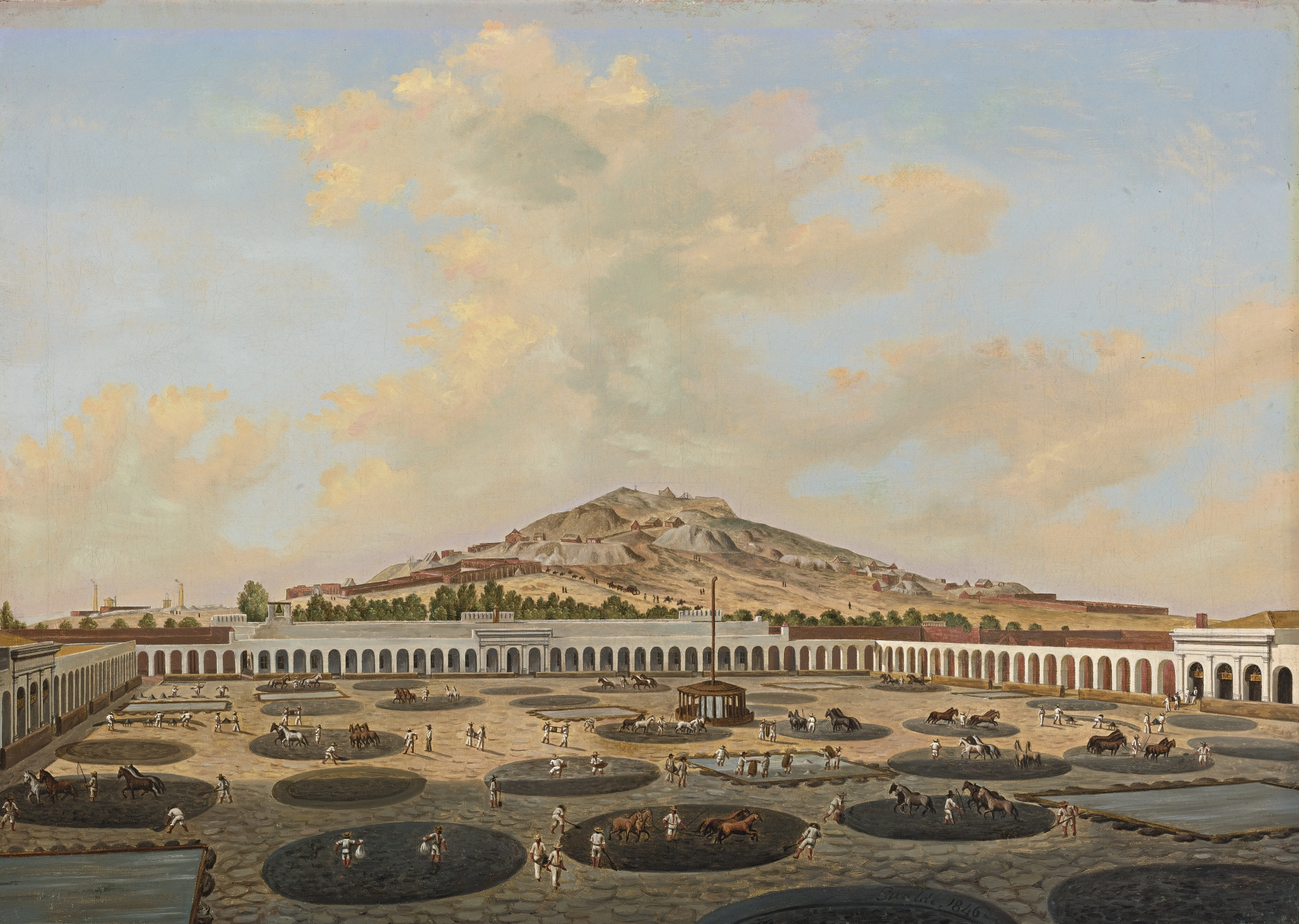
Depiction of the patio process at the Hacienda Nueva de Fresnillo, Zacatecas state (Mexico), Pietro Gualdi, 1846.

The patio process is a process for extracting silver from ore. Smelting, or refining, is most often necessary because silver is only infrequently found as a native element like some metals nobler than the redox couple 2 H^{+} + 2 e^{−}⇌ H_{2} (gold, mercury, ...). Instead, it is made up of a larger ore body. Thus, smelting, or refining, is necessary to reduce the compound containing the Ag^{+} cation into metallic Ag and to remove other byproducts to get at pure silver.

The process, which uses mercury amalgamation to recover silver from ore, was first used at scale by Bartolomé de Medina in Pachuca, Mexico, in 1554. It replaced smelting as the primary method of extracting silver from ore at Spanish colonies in the Americas. Although some knowledge of amalgamation techniques were likely known since the classical era, it was in the New World that it was first used on a large industrial scale.

Other amalgamation processes were later developed, importantly the pan amalgamation process, and its variant, the Washoe process. The silver separation process generally differed from gold parting and gold extraction, although amalgamation with mercury is also sometimes used to extract gold. While gold was often found in the Americas as a native metal or alloy, silver was often found as a compound such as silver chloride and silver sulfide, and therefore required mercury amalgamation for refinement.

== Development of the patio process ==
Bartolomé de Medina was a successful Spanish merchant who became fascinated with the problem of decreasing silver yields from ores mined in Spanish America. By the mid-sixteenth century, it was well known in Spain that American silver production was in decline due to the depletion of high-grade ores and increasing production costs. The New Laws, prohibiting the enslavement of Indians, had resulted in higher labor costs as miners turned to wage labor and expensive African slaves. These higher production costs made mining and smelting anything but the highest grade silver ores prohibitively expensive, just as the availability of high grade ores was in decline.

Bartolomé de Medina initially focused his attentions on learning about new smelting methods from smelters in Spain. He was approached during his research by an unknown German man, known only as "Maestro Lorenzo", who told him that silver could be extracted from ground ores using mercury and a salt-water brine. With this knowledge, Medina left Spain for New Spain (Mexico) in 1554 and established a model patio refinery in order to prove the effectiveness of the new technology. Medina is generally credited with adding "magistral" (a type of copper sulfate CuSO_{4} derived from pyrites) to the mercury and salt-water (H_{2}O · NaCl) solution in order to catalyze the amalgamation reaction.

Some historians assert that there were already sufficient copper sulfates in the local ores and that no additional magistral was needed, though others argue that while naturally occurring copper sulfates allowed for potential amalgamation sans magistral, the erratic results of this method made magistral a key component of the effective refinement of ore on a large scale. Regardless of whether or not Medina's contribution was entirely original, he promoted his process to local miners and was able to obtain a patent from the Viceroy of New Spain. As a result, he is generally credited with the invention of silver amalgamation in the form of the patio process.

The effectiveness of this method was such that when German experts arrived in America in the late 1700s to teach the newest amalgamation technology, they admitted they did not believe they could improve upon the American method in its context. Friedrich Sonneschmidt, a German refiner, stated: "It is not to be expected that there will ever be found a method by which all varieties of ore can be refined, having expenses lower than or even equal to those required by the patio beneficiation." The amalgamation was so efficient that a refiner could turn a profit even if the ores were poor enough to yield only 1.5 oz of silver per 100 lbs of original material.

== Basic elements of the patio process ==
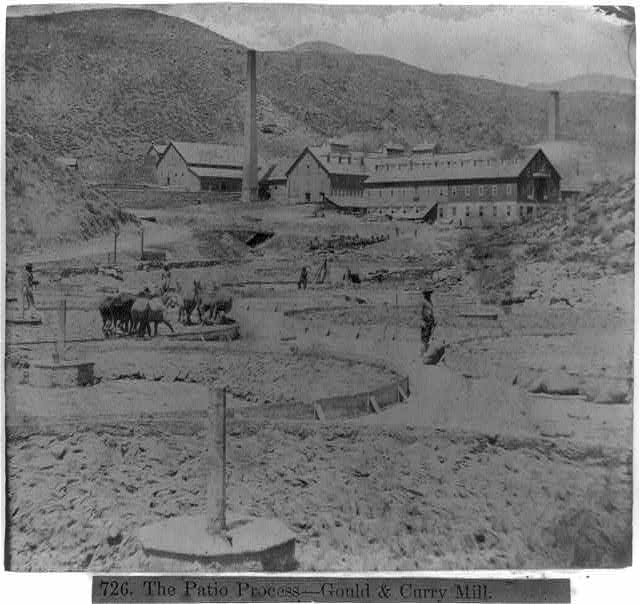
Patio process at the Gould & Curry Mill, Comstock Lode, USA, 1866

Before being taken to the ingenio (amalgamation refinery), excess material would be broken off of the silver ore. At the refiner, it was ground to a fine sand (harina) by an arrastra or stamp mill, which consisted of a rotating shaft fitted with heavy iron stamps that crushed the ore against a mortar block. The harina was then placed in heaps of 2,000 lbs or more, to which was added salt, water, magistral (essentially an impure form of copper sulfate, CuSO_{4}), and mercury. This was then mixed by bare-legged Indian laborers or by horses or mules and spread in a 1-to-2-foot-thick (0.30 to 0.61 m) layer in a patio (a shallow-walled, open enclosure).

After six to eight weeks of mixing and soaking in the sun, a complex reaction converted the silver to native metal, which formed an amalgam with the mercury. The mixture was then washed and strained through a canvas bag before being placed into a hooded oven. Heating this amalgam vaporized the mercury, leaving the silver. The mercury vapor would then condense on the cooled hood, where it could be collected and reused. The amount of salt and copper sulfate varied from one-quarter to ten pounds of one or the other, or both, per ton of ore treated. The decision of how much of each ingredient to add, how much mixing was needed, and when to halt the process depended on the skill of an azoguero (English: quicksilver man). The loss of mercury in amalgamation processes is generally one to two times the weight of silver recovered.

The patio process was the first form of amalgamation. However, it is unclear whether this process or a similar process—in which amalgamation occurred in heated vats rather than open patios—was the predominant form of amalgamation in New Spain, as the earliest known illustration of the patio process dates from 1761. There is substantial evidence that both processes were used from an early date in New Spain, while open patios were never adopted in Peru. Instead, Andean refiners placed milled ore in stone tanks vaulted over a fire, which helped accelerate amalgamation by mitigating the bitterly cold temperatures at the high elevation of the Andean mines. Both processes required that ore be crushed and refiners quickly established mills to process ore once amalgamation was introduced. Water mills were common in the Andes, powered by man-made dams, while in New Spain, where water was relatively scarce, mills were often powered by horses or other draft animals.

Due to amalgamation's reliance upon mercury, an expansion of mercury production was central to the expansion of silver production. A key source of mercury was at Huancavelica, Peru, where vast deposits were discovered in 1563. Additional mercury was sourced from Almadén, Spain, and Idrija in present-day Slovenia. From shortly after the invention of mercury amalgamation to the end of the colonial period, the Spanish crown maintained a monopoly on mercury production and distribution, ensuring a steady supply of royal income. Fluctuations in mercury prices generally resulted in corresponding increases and decreases in silver production. Crown control over these prices could be used to intentionally depress or stimulate silver production in Spanish colonies.

== Broader historical significance ==
The introduction of amalgamation to silver refining in the Americas not only ended the mid-sixteenth century crisis in silver production, it also inaugurated a rapid expansion of silver production in New Spain and Peru as miners could now profitably mine lower-grade ores. In addition, places that were rich in ore but too isolated from indigenous populations or forests for the labor- and fuel-intensive smelting method to be profitable, as was the case with Potosí in modern-day Bolivia, were now viable. As a result of this expansion, the Americas became the primary producer of the world's silver, with Spanish America producing three-fifths of the world's silver supply prior to 1900.

Increased silver production due to the introduction of mercury amalgamation resulted in an increased demand for labor. In New Spain, mining labor was initially supplied by the encomienda system or by enslaved Indians before transitioning to a repartimiento rotating labor system, but by the early 1600s, the majority of workers were Indian free wage or debt peonage workers. These naboríos were free, unattached Indians who contracted themselves out for sustenance and payment. Spaniards tended to distrust naboríos and accused them of profiteering by stealing ore, taking advances and fleeing, or contracting themselves out to multiple employers at a time. Regardless, the mines in New Spain increasingly relied on naboríos, who constituted over two thirds of mine workers in the region. Repartimiento Indian workers made up roughly seventeen percent of laborers, with another fourteen percent composed of Black slaves. Throughout the Spanish colonies, white men typically took positions as supervisors or mine owners.

The introduction of silver amalgamation allowed for an expansion of silver production in Peru that had profound consequences for Peru's native population. From 1571, the year the amalgamation process was introduced to the Andes, to 1575, Peru's silver production quintupled. In 1572, in order to provide sufficient labor to accommodate the expansion of silver mining to lower-grade ores, Viceroy Francisco Toledo organized an Indian draft labor system, the mita. This system of forced labor was based on the mit'a, a rotating, reciprocal labor obligation instituted in pre-Hispanic Andean society. Under this system, thousands of natives were forced to work in silver and mercury mines for less than subsistence-level wages.

Thirteen thousand draft laborers per year worked at the largest mine in the Americas, located at Potosí in modern Bolivia. Native attempts to avoid the mita led to the abandonment of many Indian villages throughout Peru as thousands of Indians either moved permanently to Potosí or fled their traditional ayllus in order to escape the labor draft. Spanish monopolization of refining through amalgamation cut natives out of what had earlier been a native-dominated enterprise. Refining represented the most profitable segment of silver production. In conjunction with the mita, the exclusion of natives from owning refineries contributed to the transformation of Peruvian natives into a poorly paid labor force.

The rapid expansion of silver production and coinage—made possible due to the invention of amalgamation—has often been identified as the primary driver of the price revolution, a period of high inflation lasting from the sixteenth to early seventeenth-century in Europe. Proponents of this theory argue that Spain's reliance on silver coins from the Americas to finance its large balance of payments deficits resulted in a general expansion of the European money supply and corresponding inflation. Critics of the theory, however, argue that inflation was really a result of European government policies and population growth.

While the role of the expansion in silver production in the price revolution may be disputed, this expansion is often acknowledged as a key ingredient in the formation of early-modern world trade. In the 1530s, China decreed that all internal taxation must be paid in silver, driving demand for Spanish American silver and facilitating the development of extensive trade networks linking Europe, Africa, Asia, and the Americas as Europeans sought to gain access to Chinese wares.

== See also ==
- Amalgam (chemistry)
- Dental amalgam
- Pan amalgamation
- Royal fifth
- Silver mining
- Spanish Empire
