= Santo Domingo (Mexico City) =

Square and church in Mexico City, Mexico

Coordinates: 19°26′18.16″N 99°8′1.38″W

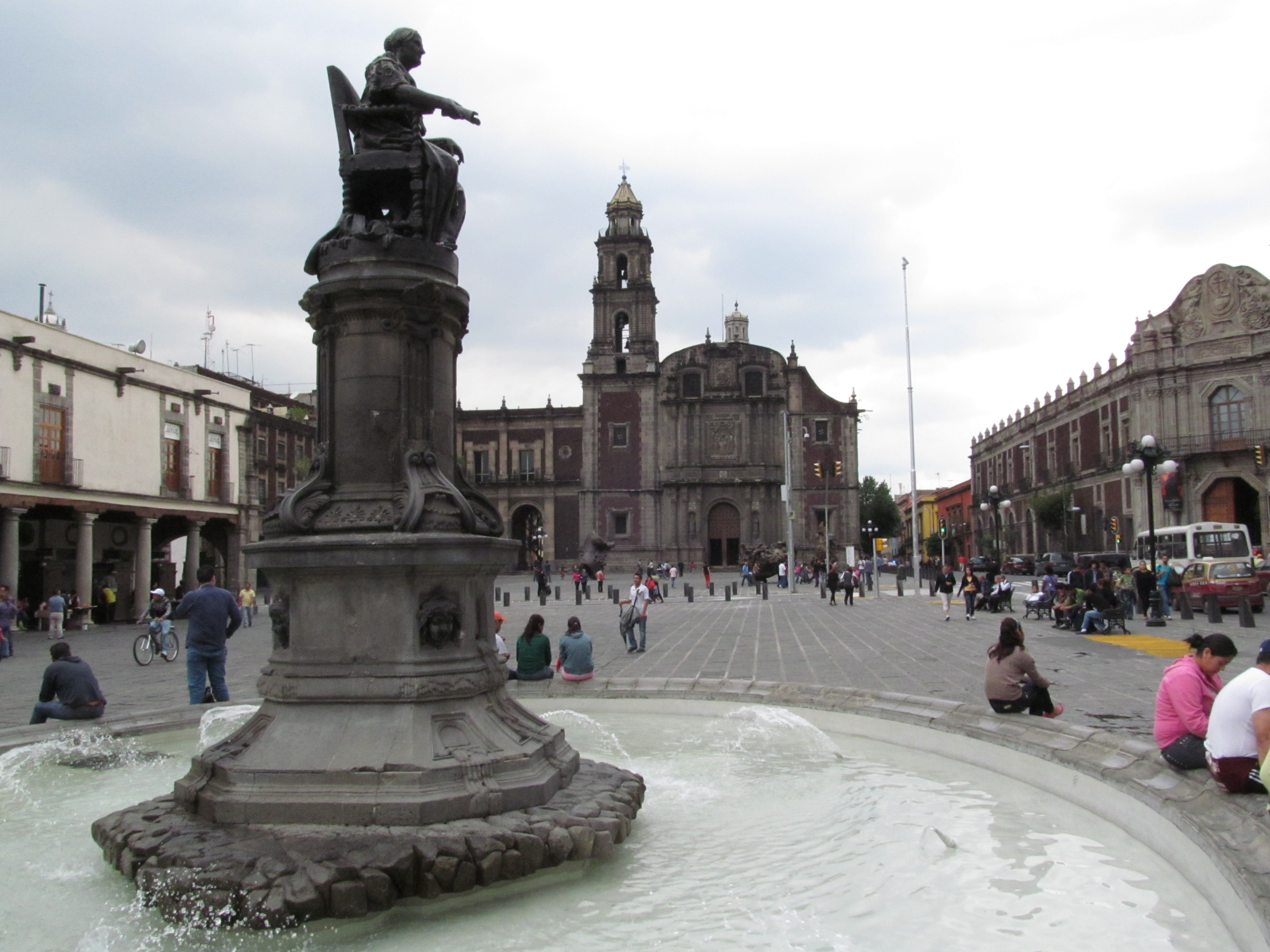
A view of the plaza

Santo Domingo in Mexico City refers to the Church of Santo Domingo and its Plaza, also called Santo Domingo. Both are located three blocks north of the Mexico City Metropolitan Cathedral following República de Brasil Street with Belisario Dominguez Street separating the two.

== The Church ==
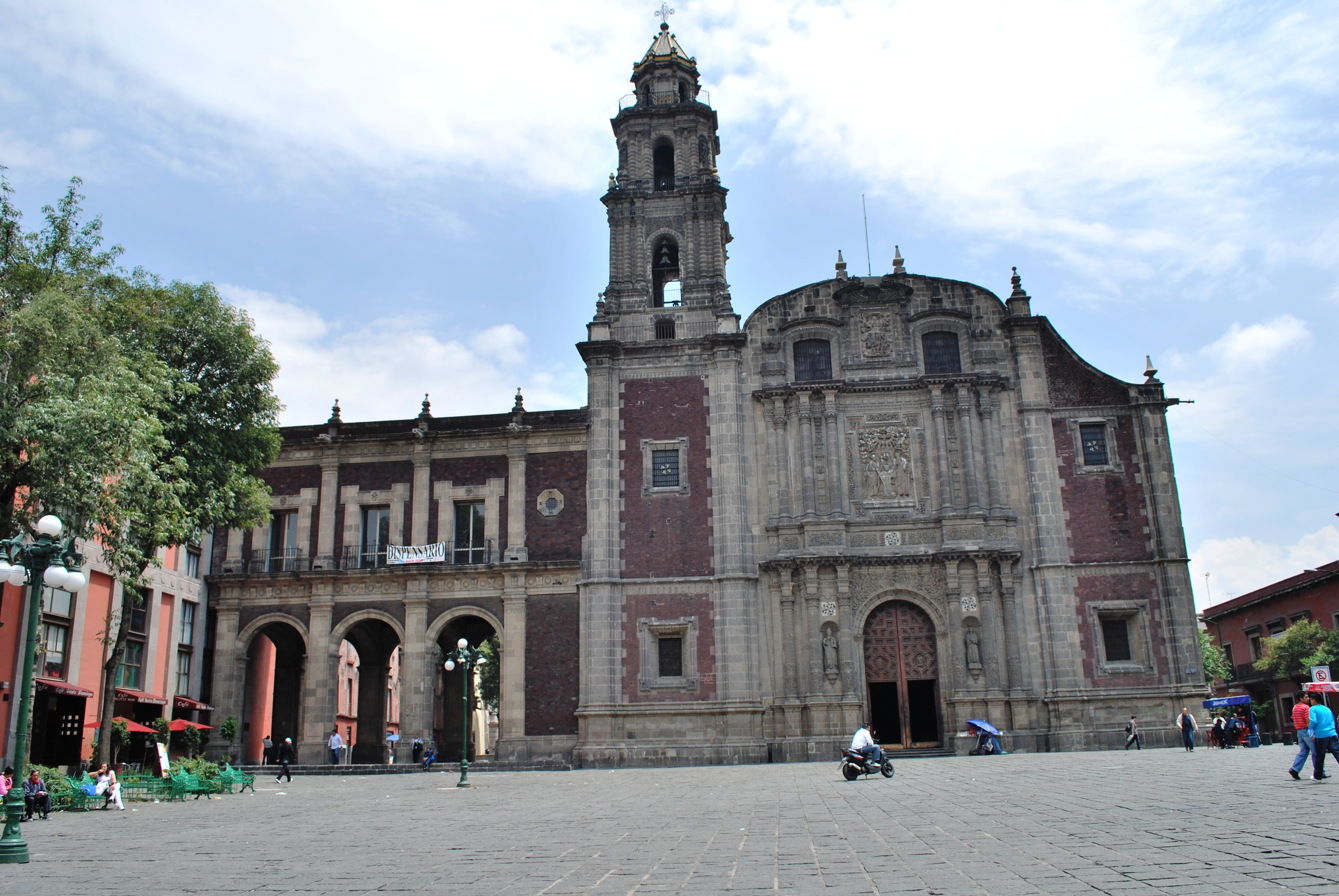
Facade of the Church of Santo Domingo

Officially known as the Señor de la Expiración Chapel, the church is located on the north side of Belisario Dominguez and faces the plaza. It is all that is left from one of the first monasteries (now, now more commonly called a friary) to be established in New Spain. This monastery was established soon after the Dominicans arrived to New Spain in 1526. They moved into houses that were donated to them by the Guerrero family, where later the Palace of the Inquisition would be built. The initially replaced the houses to found a church, living quarters and a jail for those found guilty of religious crimes. (The Dominicans were in charge of the Inquisition.) A couple of decades later, it was decided that expansion was needed and the first church on the Santo Domingo site was consecrated in 1590. Around it was built the monastery, funded by Philip II of Spain, with four patios which divided the monks and laypeople associated with the monastery by rank as well as a main hall, a rectory, a library and an infirmary. However, poor construction, the soft soil and earthquakes made rebuilding a necessity. The second church was built between 1556 and 1571. The current church the third to be built on this site. It is Baroque architecture made of pink stone, begun in 1717 and finished in 1736. The monastery and atrium that the church used to be part of was destroyed in 1861 during anti-clerical movement, destroying the chapel of Del Rosario and Tercera Orden as well. This opened up what is now Leandro Valle Street on the church's west side.

Due to its style, the church is attributed to Pedro de Arrieta. The general style is considered to be Mexican Baroque but before the introduction of the common "estipite" column with its signature inverted truncated pyramids. The front facade is covered in tezontle, a blood-colored volcanic stone and the portal is made mostly of cantera, a white/grey stone. It has twelve columns around the main entrance, with Saint Francis and Saint Augustine on the first floor. On the second floor, a stone relief depicts Saint Dominic kneeling as he receives the keys of heaven from Saint Peter and the Epistles from Saint Paul as the Holy Spirit rises above the group. In the center at the top is a bas relief of the Assumption located between two windows that light the choir area. It is decorated on the east side with stone figures of Saint Dominic and Saint Francis. Their arms are intertwined and shown to be literally holding up the Church of Letrán.

Inside, the floor plan of the church is that of a Latin cross. The main altarpiece is neoclassical and the work of Manuel Tolsá, which was created to replace the original Baroque one done by Pedro Patiño Ixtolinque. The altar to the left of the transept is dedicated to the Virgin of Covadonga. On a wall in the wide central area, there is a large niche containing the image of the Virgin Mary. Above this is a sculpture depicting the scene at the Calvary. Higher still is an oil painting of the Coronation of Mary and at the crest is the cross of the Battle of Covandonga between two windows. Each of the lateral windows has two oil paintings decorating them and finished with the coat-of-arms of Castile as well as the emblem of the Dominican order. This area is completed with the reliefs of saints and the carvings of cherubs. At the right of the transept, there is the Virgin del Camino altarpiece created by Alonso López de Herrera. The altarpiece contains figures called the "Descent," "Saint Dominic in Soriano," and gilded statues of the martyrs Saint Peter and Vicente Ferrer. The church also has a choir in the shape of a horseshoe with 32 seats made of cedar, each with an image of a different saint carved in relief into the backs.

Next to it is the neo-Baroque Rosario Chapel which dates from 1946.

This church also contains the tomb of conquistador and explorer Francisco Vázquez de Coronado. He is well known for having explored what is known today as the US Southwest. It was one of the largest expeditions carried into the North.

=== Images of the church ===
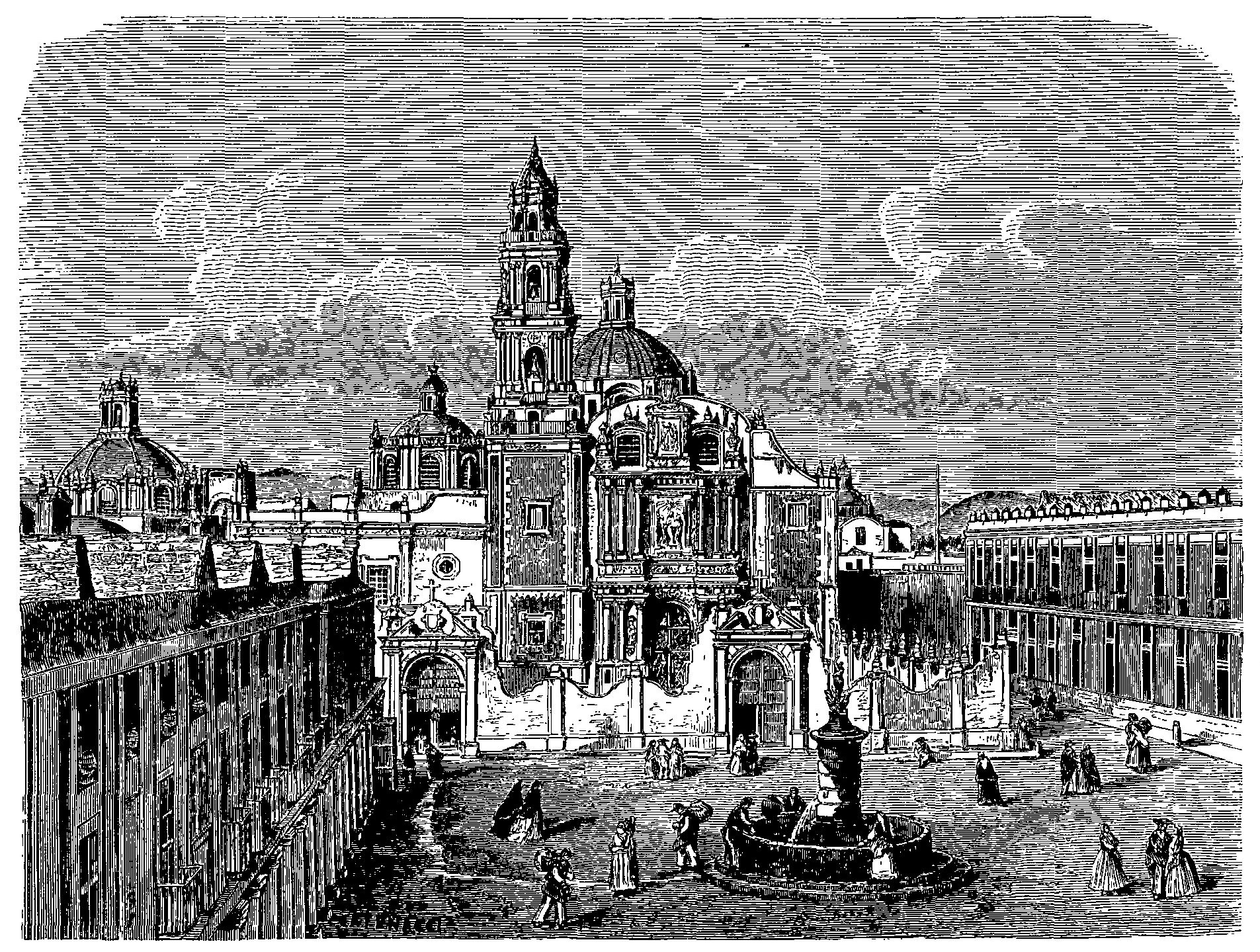
Plaza de Santo Domingo in a painting of 1862 by Hercule Catenacci and Désiré Charnay.

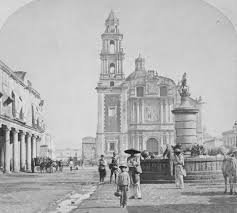
Plaza de Santo Domingo in a photo of 1873

== The Plaza ==
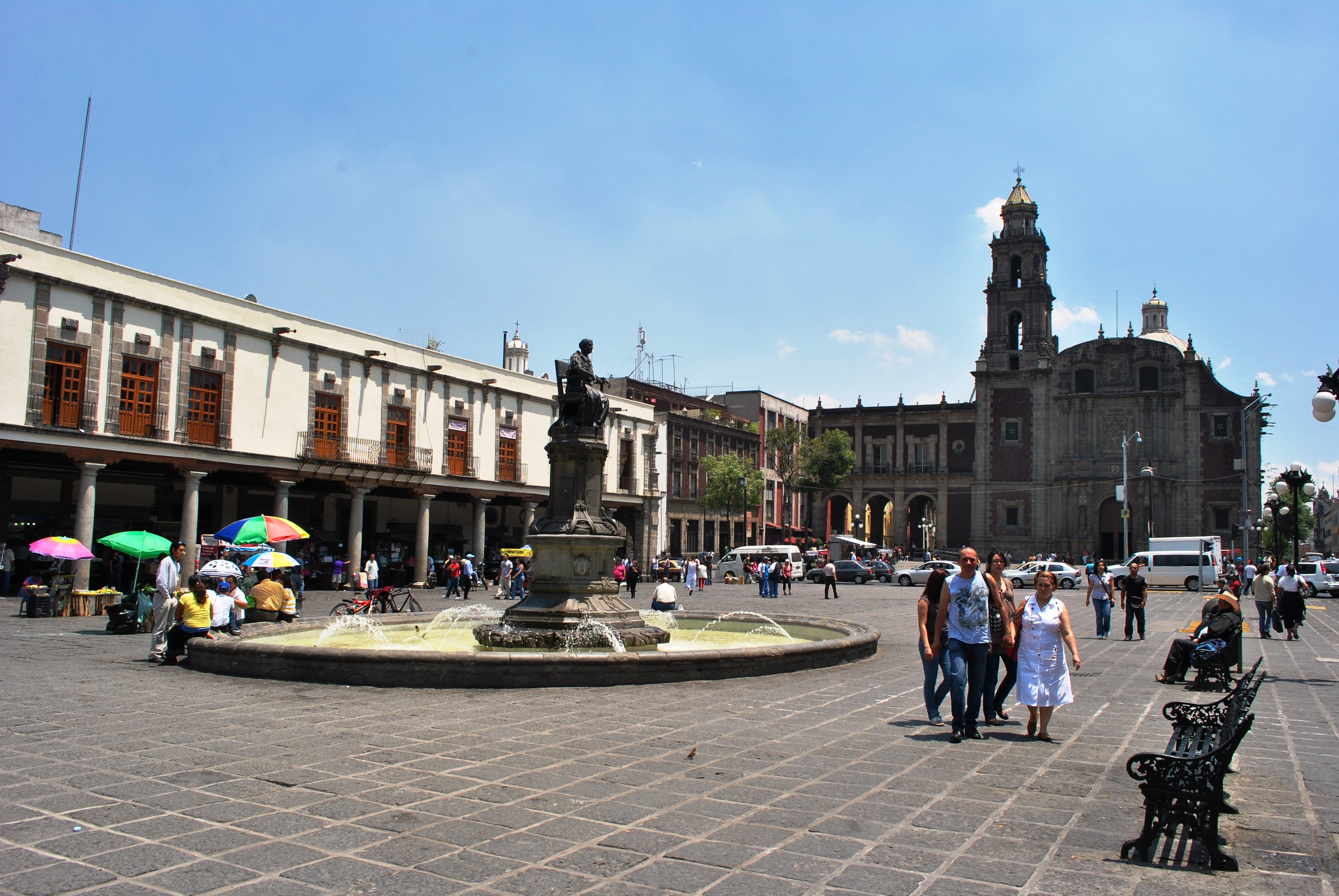
Plaza San Domingo, Portal de Evangelistas and Church of Santo Domingo

To the south of the church is Plaza San Domingo. It is flanked to the west by the Portal de Evangelistas, which is a Tuscan colonnade with round arches. Scribes with typewriters and antique printing machines work in this Portal. Scribes offer their services to illiterate clients, often offering services similar to that of lawyers, counselors, and financial consultants. A statue of Josefa Ortiz de Dominguez, a heroine of the Mexican War of Independence stands in a fountain in the middle of the plaza. It was sculpted by Enrique Alcati.

Unfortunately, this area is also very well known for the falsification of documents. According to the intelligence division of the Policia Judicial of the Distrito Federal, in addition to the 242 print shops that operate legally in this zone, there have noted 614 cases of printers set up to falsify documents in the various apartments and other living quarters that surround this area. Most of these are located on La Plaza 23 de Mayo, República de Cuba, República de Chile an Justo Sierra Streets.

=== Images of the plaza ===
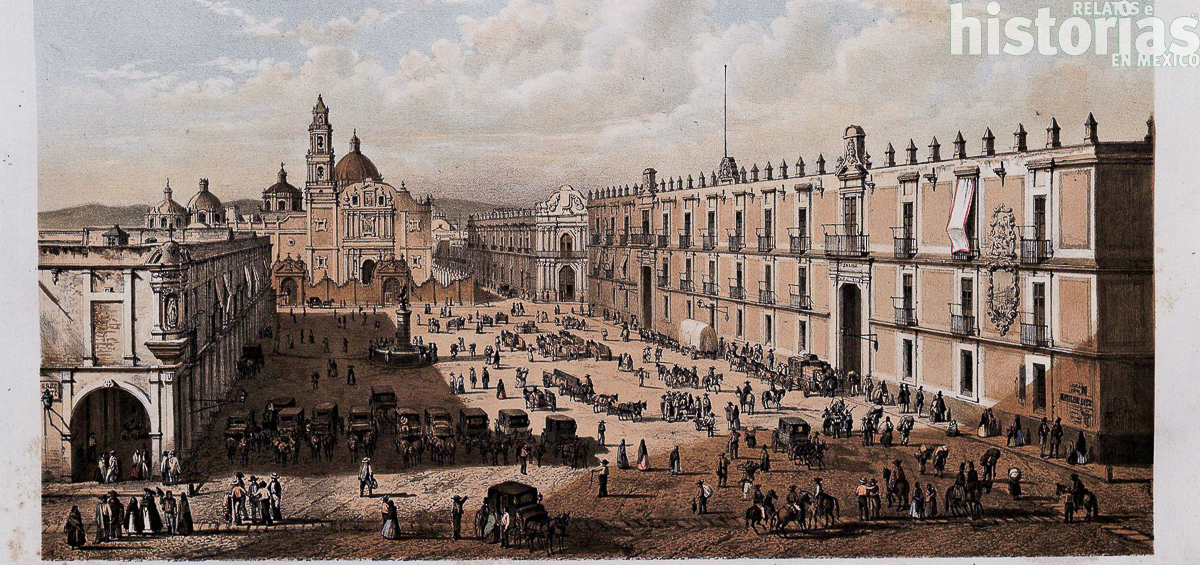
Plaza de Santo Domingo in 1855 by Casimiro Castro.

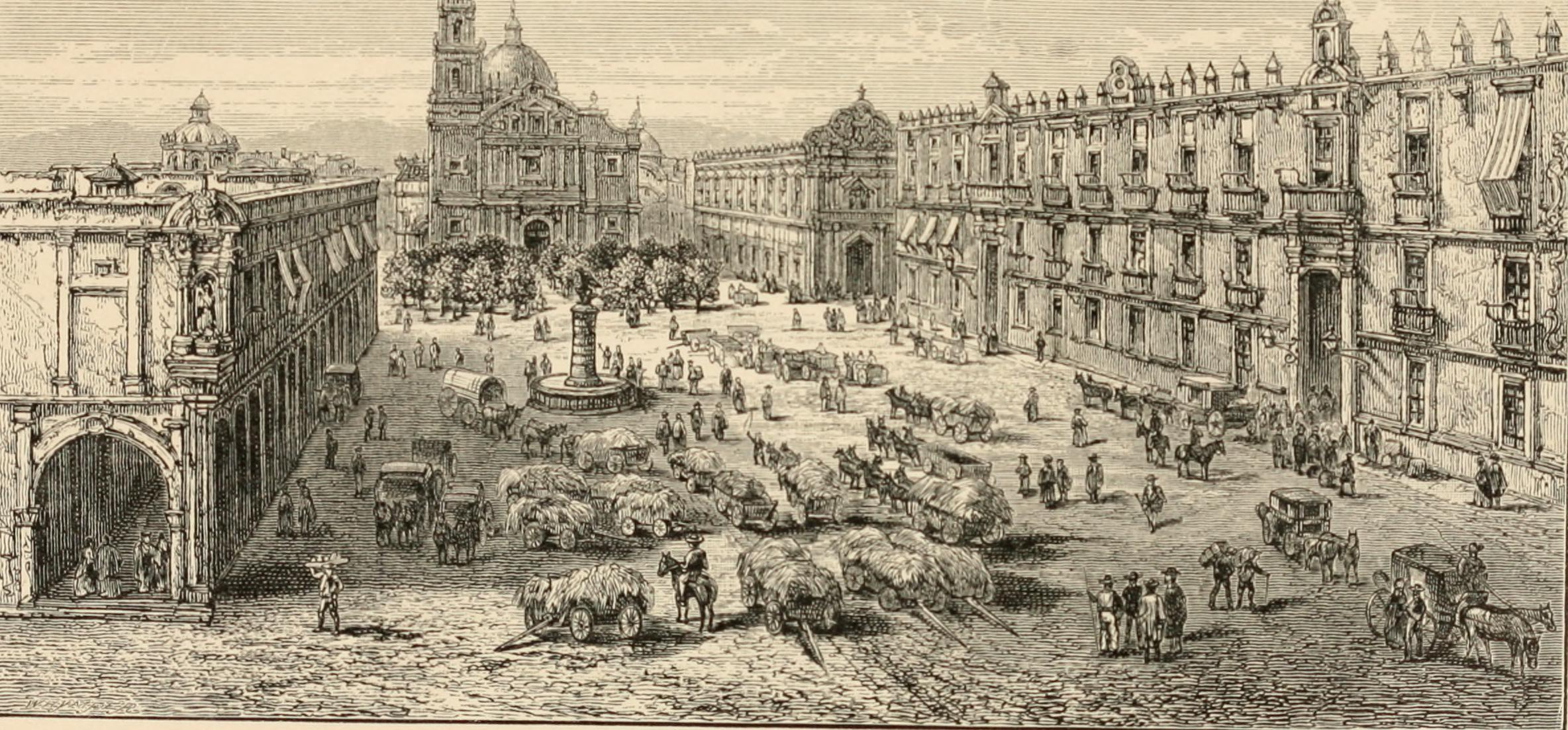
Plaza de Santo Domingo in 1883 by Thomas Brocklehurst.

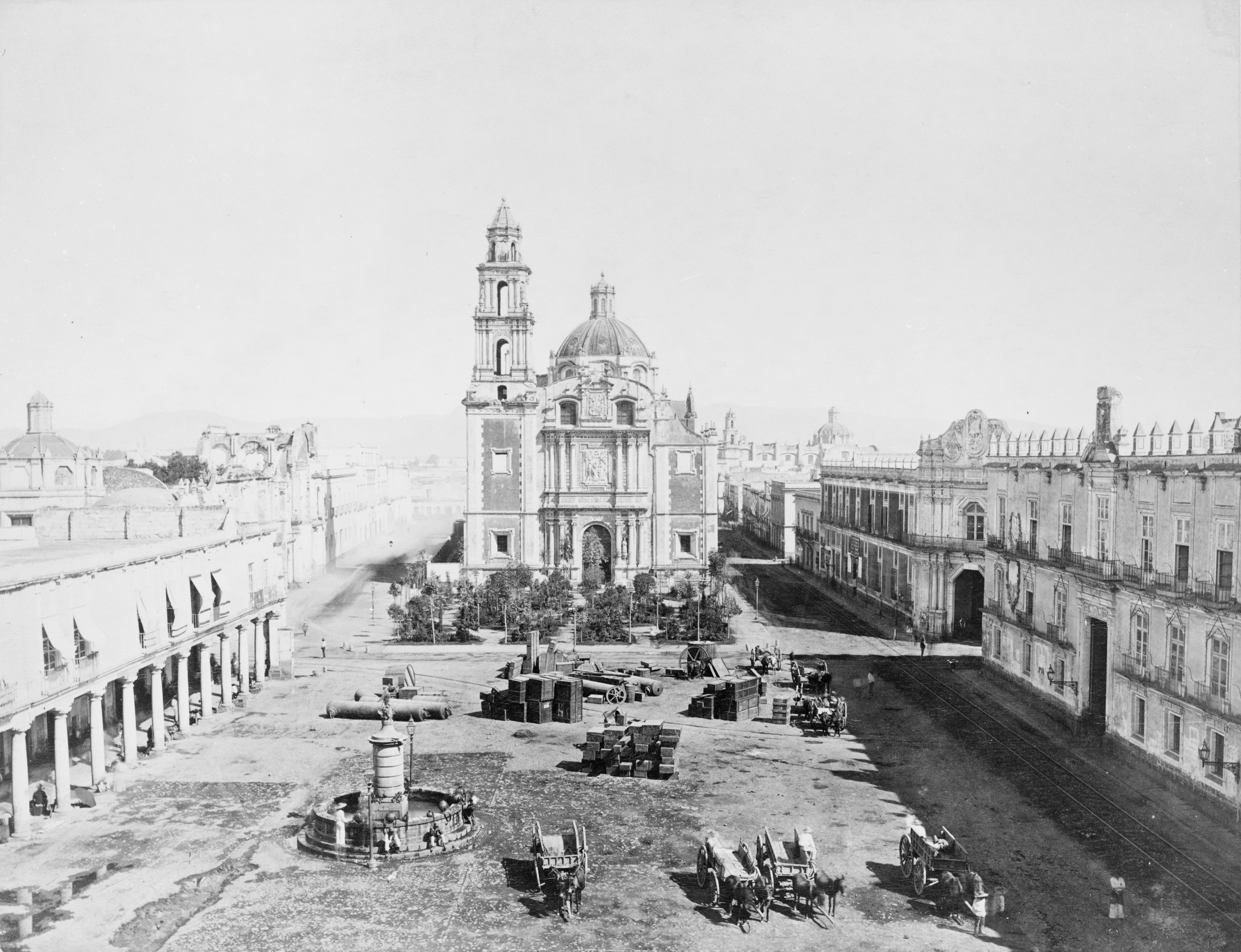
Plaza de Santo Domingo in 1900 by Abel Briquet.

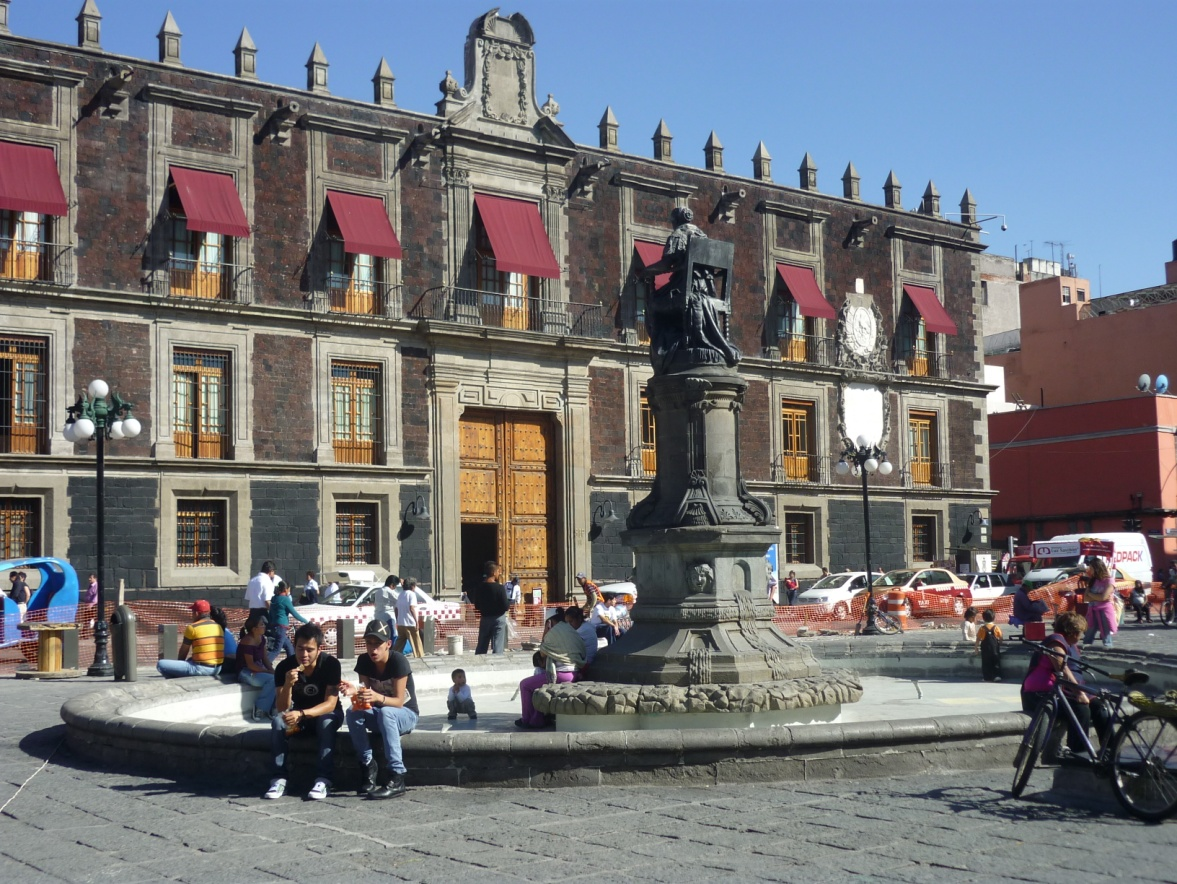
Former colonial Custom Building

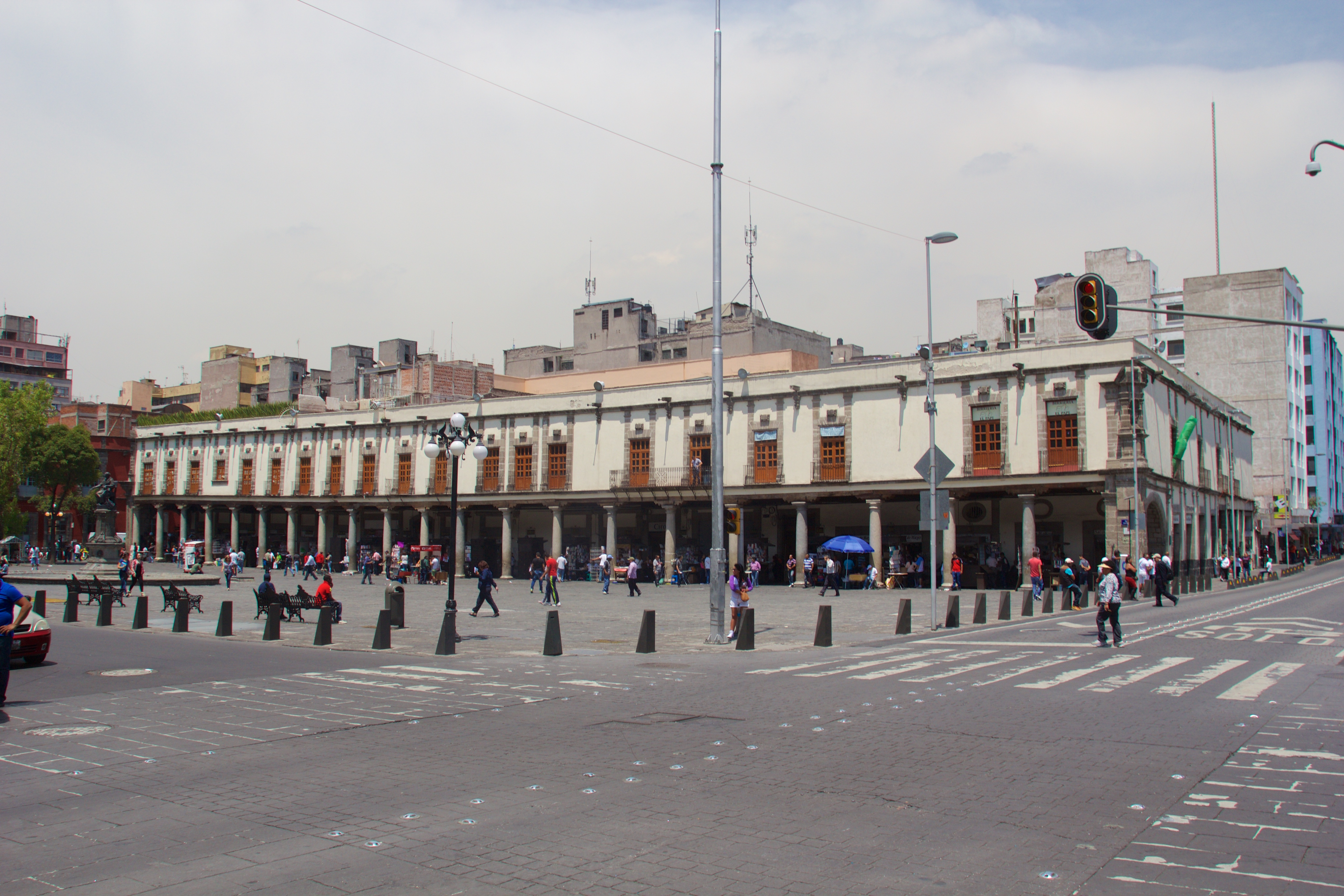
A colonial palace

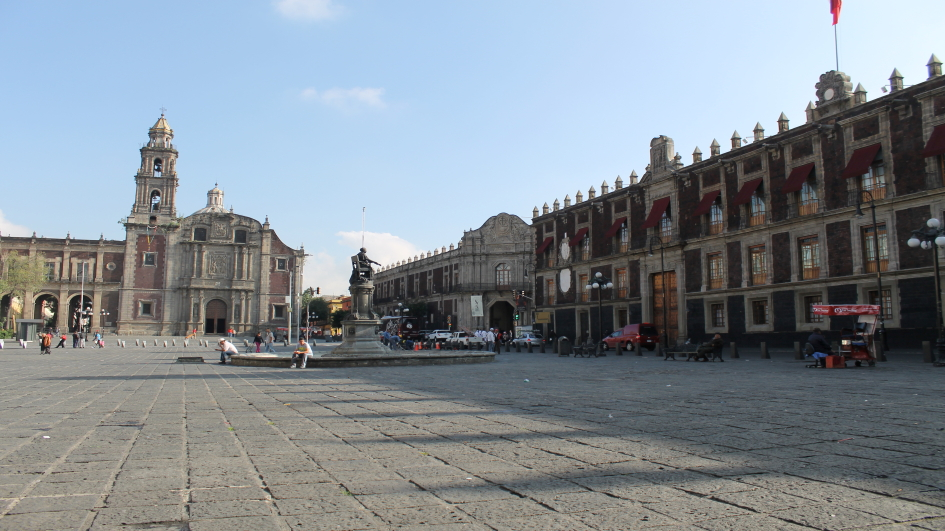
Palace of the Inquisition and church

== Historic structures near the plaza ==
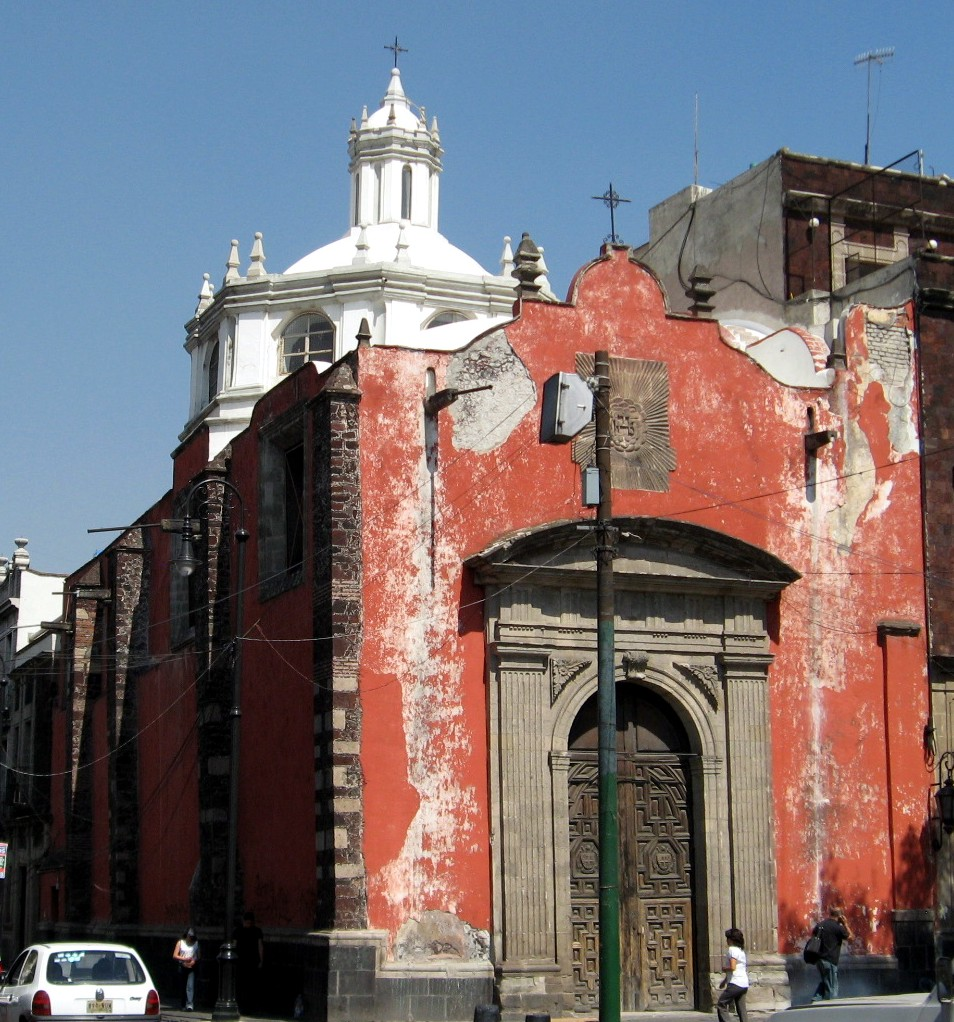
Capilla de la expiración Church

A small church called San Lorenzo-Deacon and Martyr, is located at 28 Belisario Dominguez, to the left of the facade of the Santo Domingo Church. This small church is the descendant of a number of chapels that have been on this spot, and that in the 16th century was one of four chapels that were at the corners of the monastery property. One of the oldest structures that was at this spot was called the "Chapel of the "Morenos"" (brown-skinned), named so because here is where the Dominican friars evangelized to the indigenous population. The church currently at the spot originally had 4 altars, dedicated to the crucified Christ, the rosary, Saint Joseph and Saint Dismas respectively. However, these have long since been replaced with one simple altar. The portal of the church is from the 19th century with a simple arch on posts decorated with sculpted vegetation. Above this is a monogram of Christ's name. This church has serious structural problems. It is thought that its cupola could collapse at any moment. There was one case where a stone almost a meter across fell, destroying pews, but this happened at a time when no one was in the church.

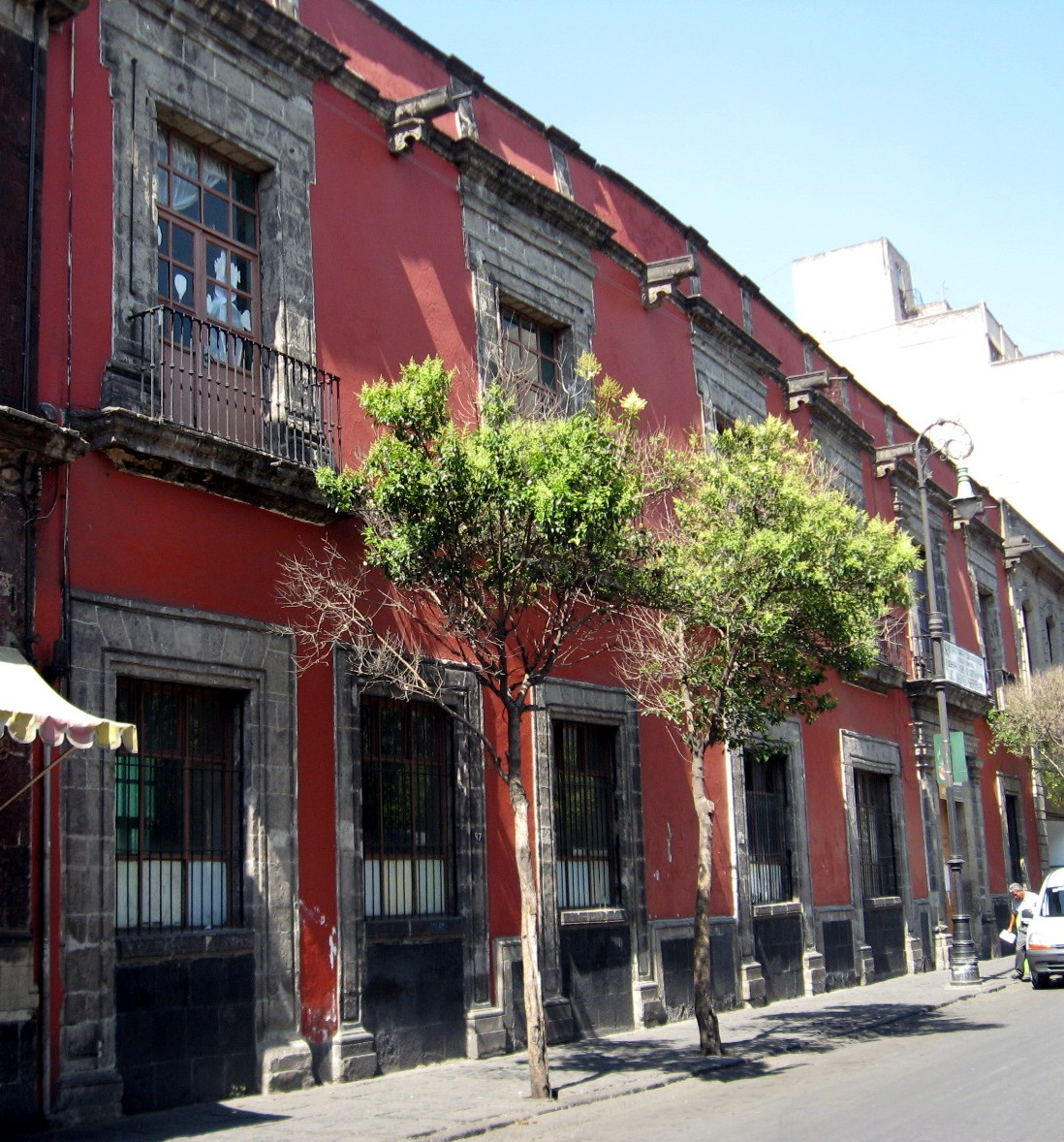
97 Republic de Cuba

At 97 Republica de Cuba is the house on property that once belonged to Juan Jaramillo, husband of La Malinche. The current structure only dates from the 18th century, but it rests on much older foundations.

At 92 Republica de Cuba is a building that dates from the Porfirio Diaz presidency at the end of the 19th century and beginning of the 20th. Today the building houses a music school.

At 37 Republica de Brasil is the house where Leona Vicario, a heroine of the Mexican War of Independence died. Today it is a private museum.

== See also ==
- List of colonial churches in Mexico City
