= Palace of the Inquisition =

Building in Centro Histórico, Mexico City

Coordinates: 19°26′16.34″N 99°8′0.18″W

- Palacio de la Inquisición
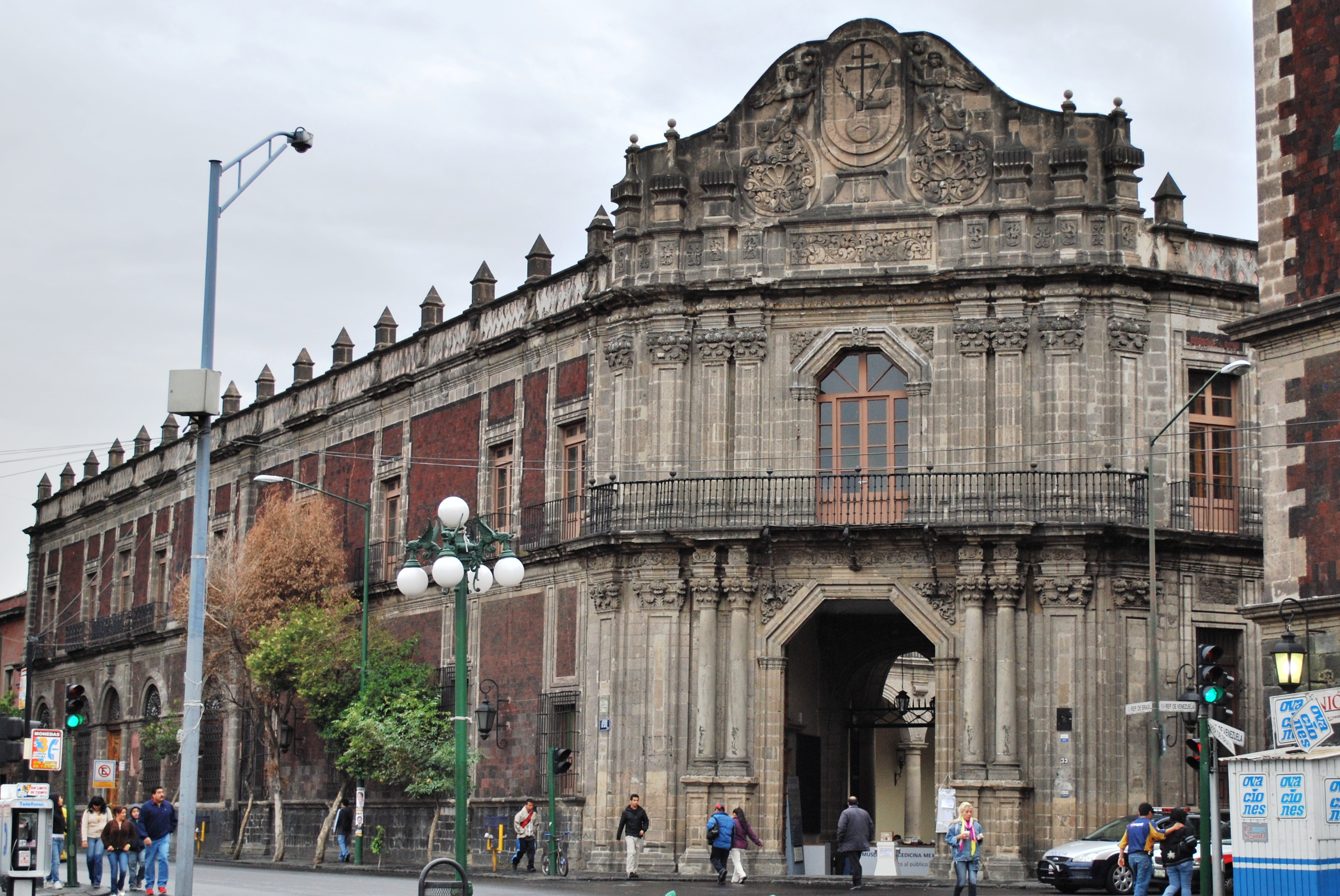
- The canted facade facing Santo Domingo Plaza

General information
- Architectural style: New Spanish Baroque
- Location: República de Venezuela #33, Centro Histórico, Mexico City. C.P. 06010
- Construction started: 1732
- Completed: 1736
- Owner: National Autonomous University of Mexico

The Palace of the Inquisition is a building in Mexico City built in the 1730s as the headquarters of the Mexican Inquisition, which now houses the Museum of Mexican Medicine. The building stands at the junction of República de Brasil and República de Venezuela streets, with its entrance at a canted corner facing Santo Domingo Plaza. When the Inquisition was abolished after the Mexican War of Independence, the building's association made it difficult to convert to other purposes. It eventually became the School of Medicine for the reconstructed National University, now the National Autonomous University of Mexico (UNAM). When UNAM moved to the Ciudad Universitaria in the 1950s, it retained ownership of the building, eventually converting it into the museum it is today.

== Inquisition in New Spain ==
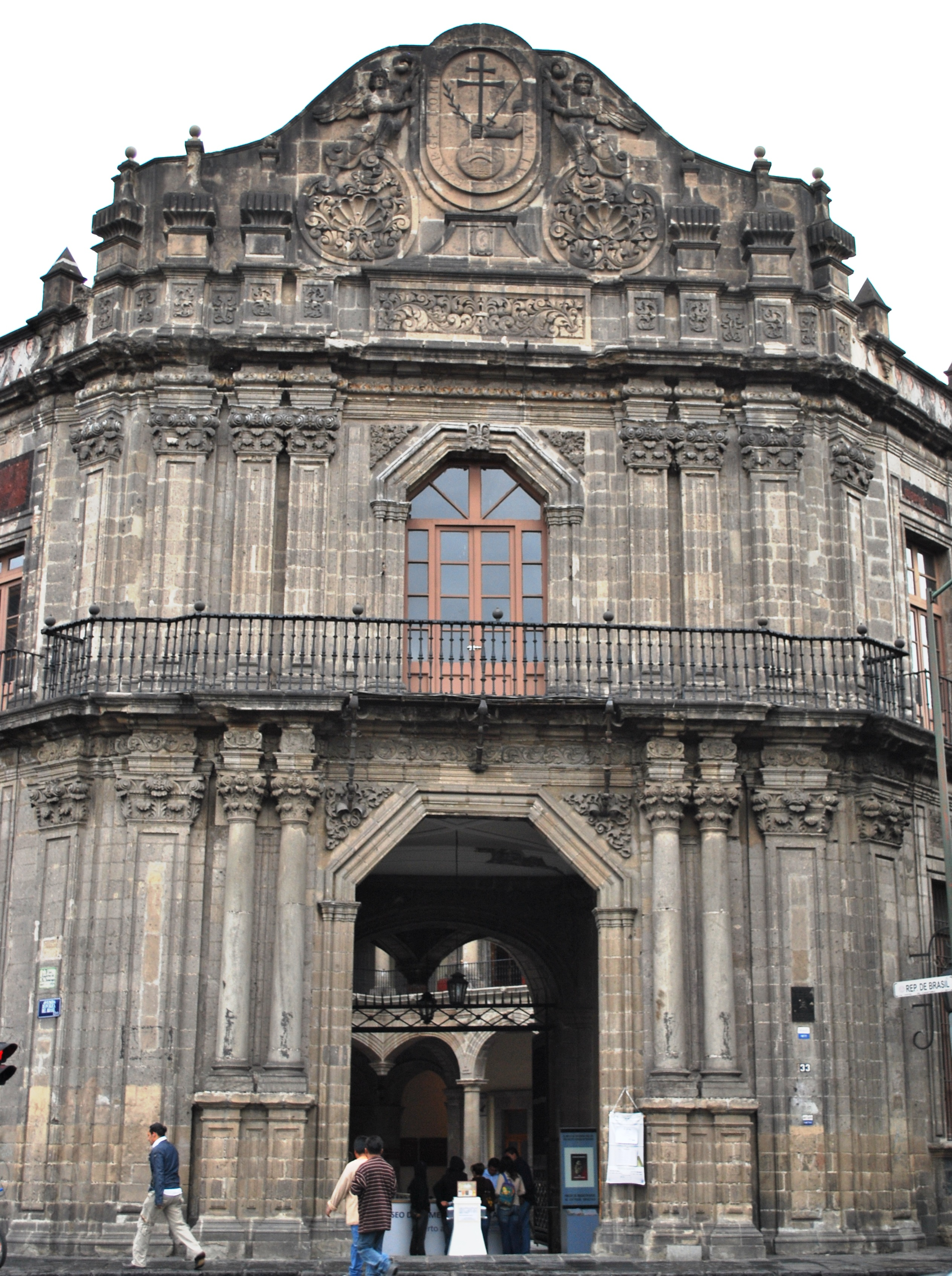
Main portal

From nearly the beginning of the colonial period until the Mexican War of Independence, this spot has been the headquarters of the Inquisition in the colony of New Spain. While the Tribunal of the Holy Inquisition was not fully established here until 1571, the first cleric with inquisitorial duties was Martin de Valencia, who came to the colony in 1524. The Dominicans, in whom the papacy had invested Inquisition duties, arrived in 1526 and proceeded to build a monastery in the area occupied by both the current palace and the Church of Santo Domingo. The first official Inquisitor for the colony, Pedro Moya de Contreras, worked in the section of the monastery, where the palace would be built in the 18th century.

The Inquisition was officially established here due to a 1566 conspiracy led by Martín Cortés, son of Hernán Cortés, threatened to make the new colony independent of Spain. The plot was denounced by Baltazar de Aguilar Cervantes and Inquisition trials of various Criollos began. The accused were subject to torture and harsh sentences, especially when before a magistrate by the name of Muñoz. The first victims of this series of trials were the brothers Alonso and Gil Gonzalez de Alvila Alvarado. Despite having the sympathy of the local citizens and of the chroniclers, both brothers were convicted. Their punishment was to be decapitated, and their house, located on part of the site of the Templo Mayor, was razed to the ground, and the sitesown with salt.

The Inquisition here heard a number of other famous cases during its time, including the prosecution of the Carbajal family for reversion to Judaism, and the case of Martin Villavicencio, alias Martin Garatuza, famous for frauds including a long period of traveling the country posing as a priest, living fraudulently by hearing confessions and saying mass without being ordained; his legendary frauds and escapes would inspire one of the best-known 19th-century Mexican novels, Vicente Riva Palacio's Martín Gartuza. Servando Teresa de Mier spent time in the jail here, and this court sentenced Miguel Hidalgo to defrocking and excommunication before his 1811 execution. Soon after, in 1820, the Inquisition was officially disbanded in Mexico.

== Architectural history ==
The building that stands at the site now was built between 1732 and 1736 by Pedro de Arrieta, who also worked on a number of other significant buildings in the city, including the Metropolitan Cathedral and La Profesa Church. Even though Arrieta was famous for his work, he died broke shortly after the completion of the Palace of the Inquisition, for which he received a daily wage of two pesos.

Originally Arrieta constructed a two-story building, with a third floor added in the 19th century. As the headquarters of the Inquisition, this building had hearing rooms, judges’ chambers, a secret chamber, a jail, and accommodations for two inquisitors. The palace was popularly known as the Casa Chata ("Flat-faced House"). This referred to how its southwest corner being canted (seemingly cut off or pushed in) in order to face Santo Domingo Plaza. Its jail was known as the "prison of an eternity" (la cárcel de la perpetua), since many inmates were confined for life.

== Post-Inquisition history ==
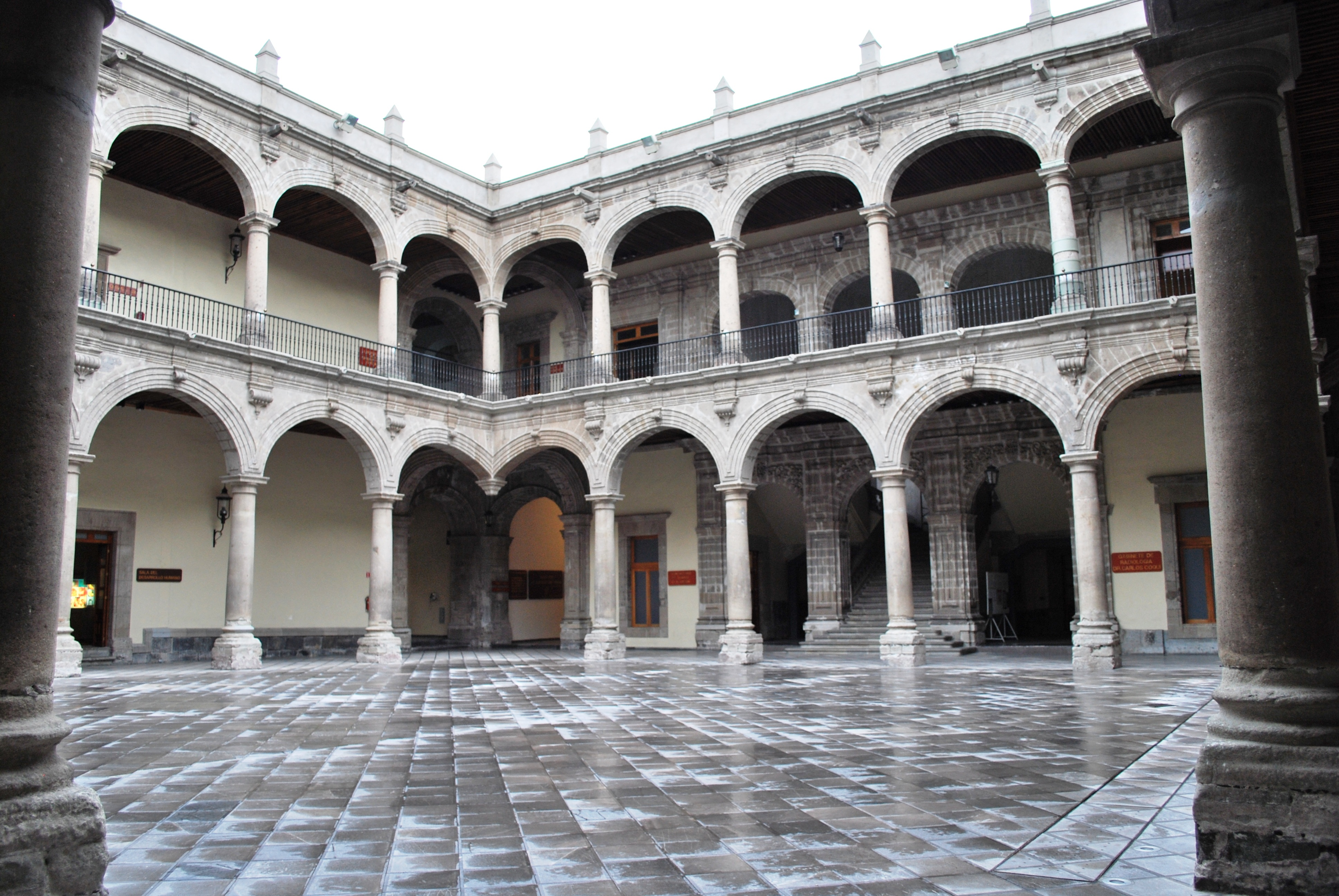
Main patio

After the end of the Inquisition, in 1838, it was put up for sale by public auction, but no one offered the minimum price. It was finally purchased by the archbishopric. Later it served as lottery offices, a primary school and a military barracks. In 1854, it was sold to the School of Medicine, which at the time was offering classes in professors' homes. After the purchase, a number of changes were made, and a boarding school created here. Eventually, it would become the school of medicine and nursing of the National University (today's UNAM) In 1873, in despair over an unrequited love, romantic poet Manuel Acuña committed suicide by poison in a room here. In 1879, after modification, the old chapel became the Academy of Medicine and a third floor was added, which resulted in the removal of the crest which held the coat-of-arms of the Inquisition.

When all the faculties of UNAM, including the School of Medicine, moved to the Ciudad Universitaria in the 1950s, this palace was in such poor shape that a number of its arches were in danger of falling. Restoration work commenced shortly afterwards and was completed in 1980. In 1982, the building that once was the prison was reintegrated into the main complex and since then has been used as a theater and to accommodate the lectures of visiting professors.

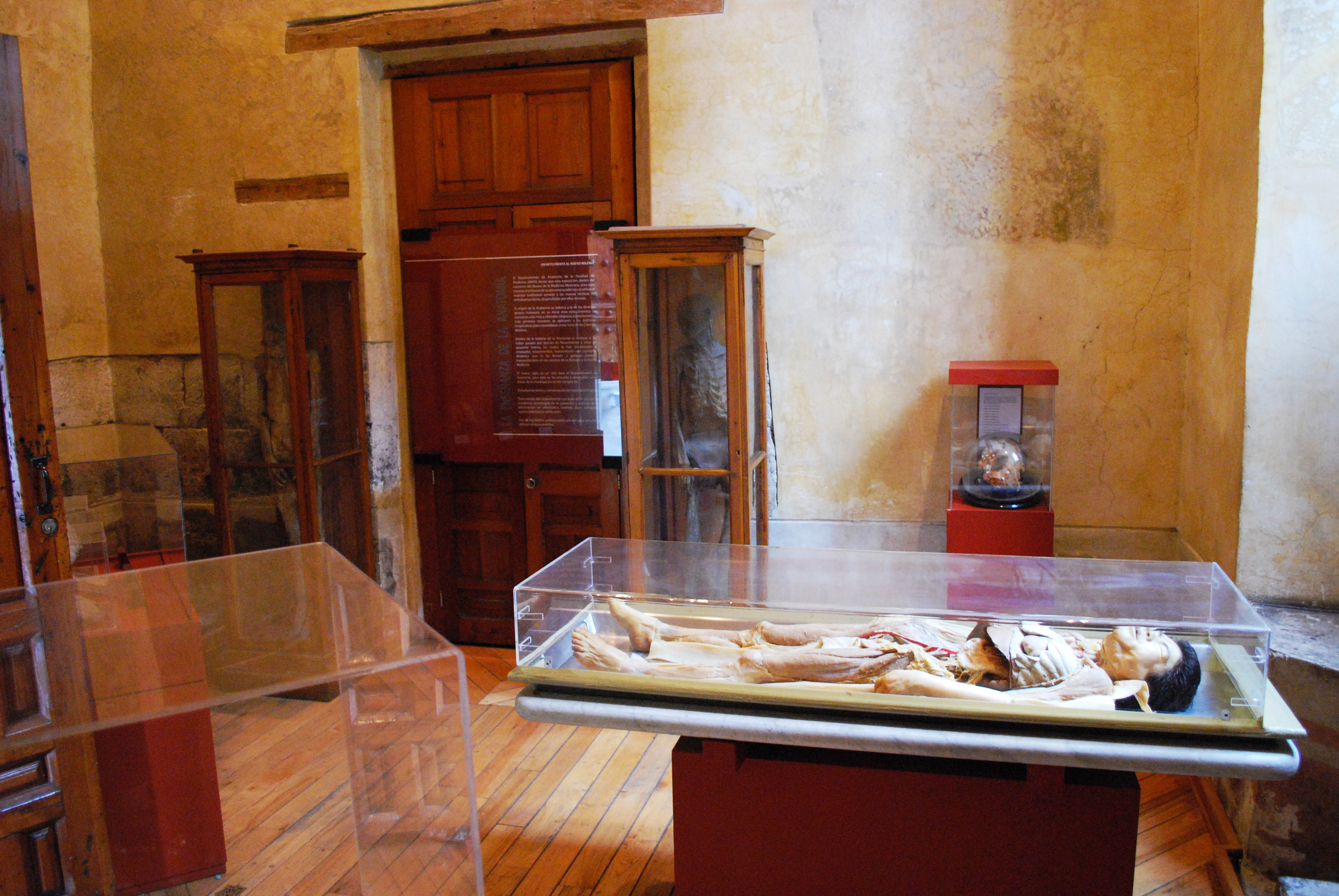
First exhibition room of the museum

Today the building still belongs to UNAM and functions as the Museum of Medicine. This museum was inaugurated on 22 December 1980, and designed as a way to preserve the history of medicine in Mexico as well as promote the values associated with this field. It was also considered to be a way to conserve one of the properties that UNAM still holds in the historic downtown area. The museum has 24 rooms that cover the history of medicine in this country, from pre-Hispanic times to the 20th century. Among its collections are a room devoted to indigenous herbal medicine, various rooms devoted to old medical equipment and machines, a room about human development and a collection of wax figures used for the teaching of diseases and pathologies.

== Description ==
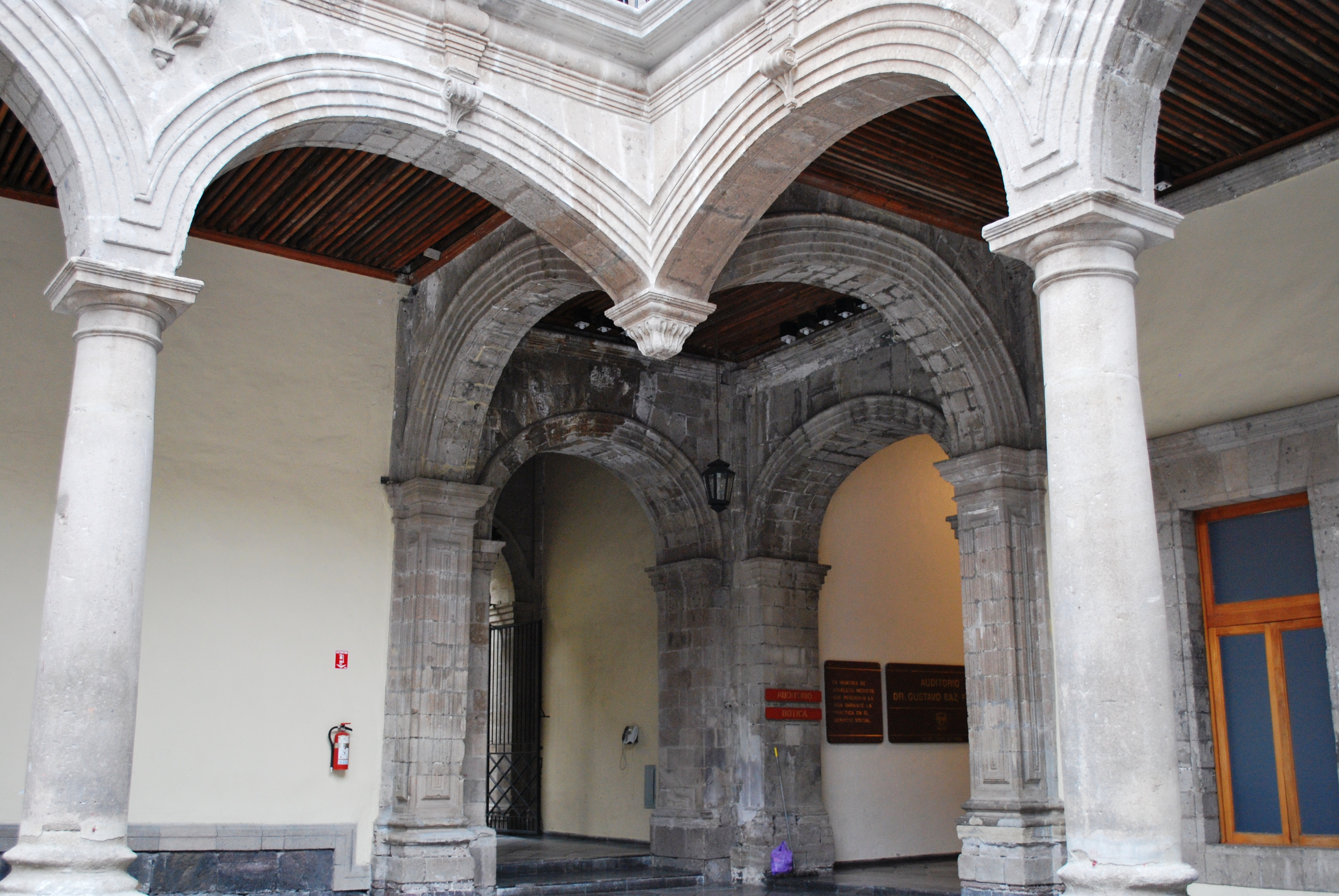
A "hanging arch", with a boss (knob)

Like many other buildings in the historic downtown, the facade is covered in tezontle (a blood-red porous volcanic stone), with windows and doors framed with chiluca (a grayish-white stone), but the building has two main notable features. This first is that its main portal is located at the southwest corner, which is canted (cut off) in order to face Santo Domingo Plaza. Arrieta came up with the idea, an innovation in New Spain. With this design, not only would the building face the plaza, its two side streets would lead to its door. This feature would earn the palace the nickname of "flat-faced" (chata), and this idea was declared innovative and beautiful. The other feature is the patio. The arches on the four corners do not rest on columns, but seem to hang from the ceiling, similar to a vaulted ceiling. In fact, they are crossed arches that are supported by pillars attached to the walls and the first columns on each side.

== Gallery ==
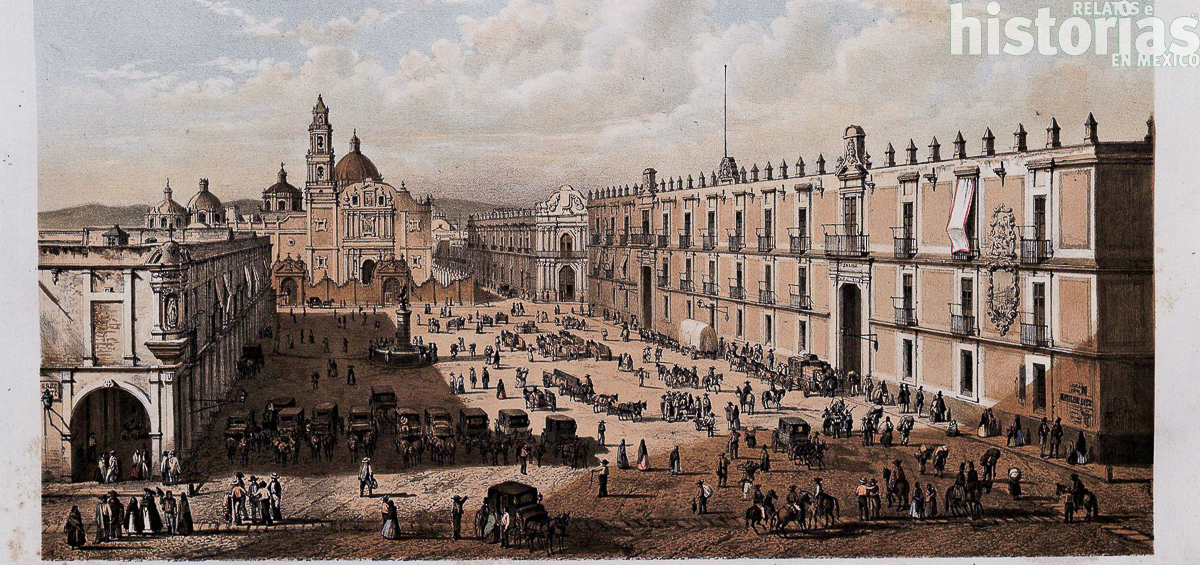
Plaza de Santo Domingo in 1855, by Casimiro Castro. The palace is at the background.

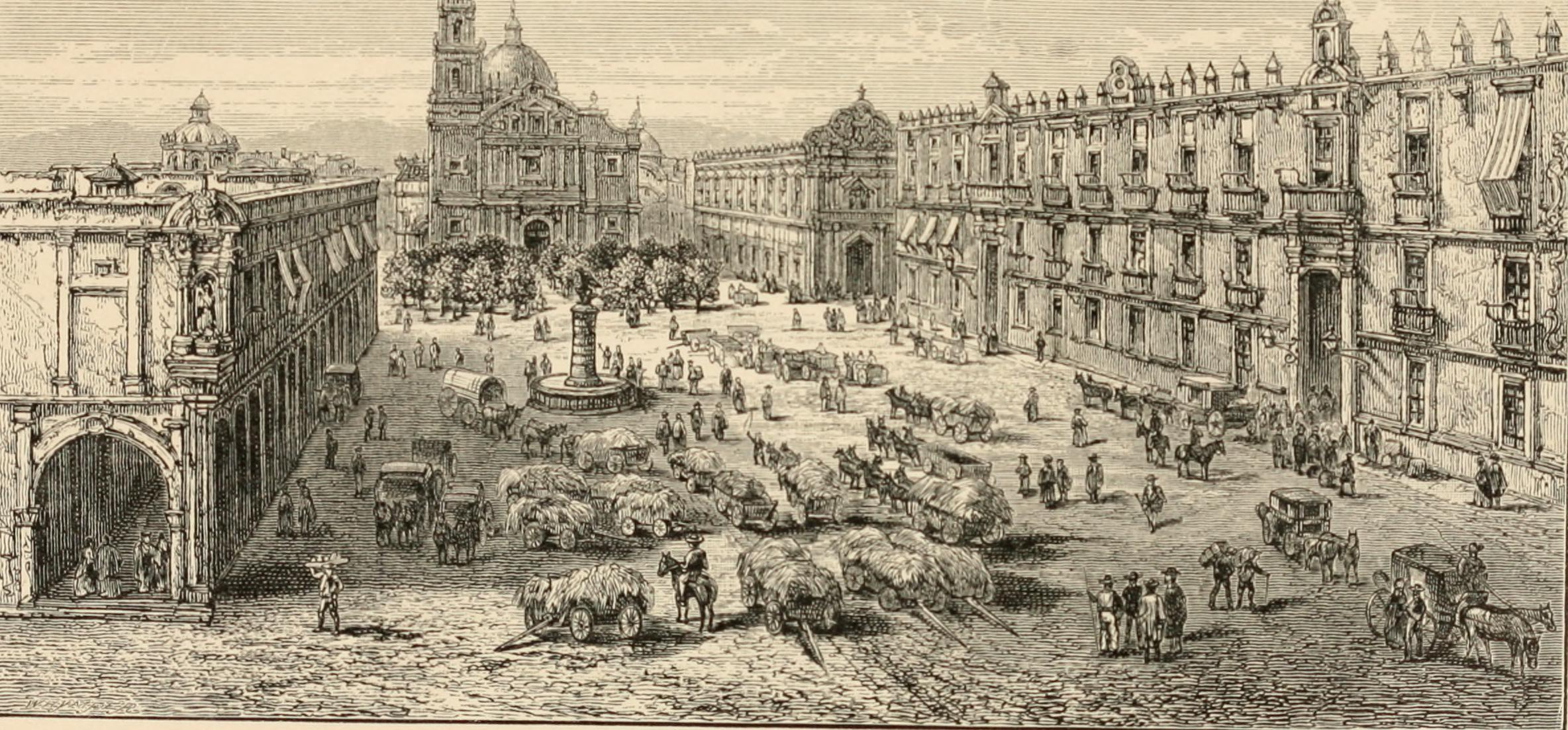
The plaza in 1883, by Thomas Brocklehurst. The palace is in the back.

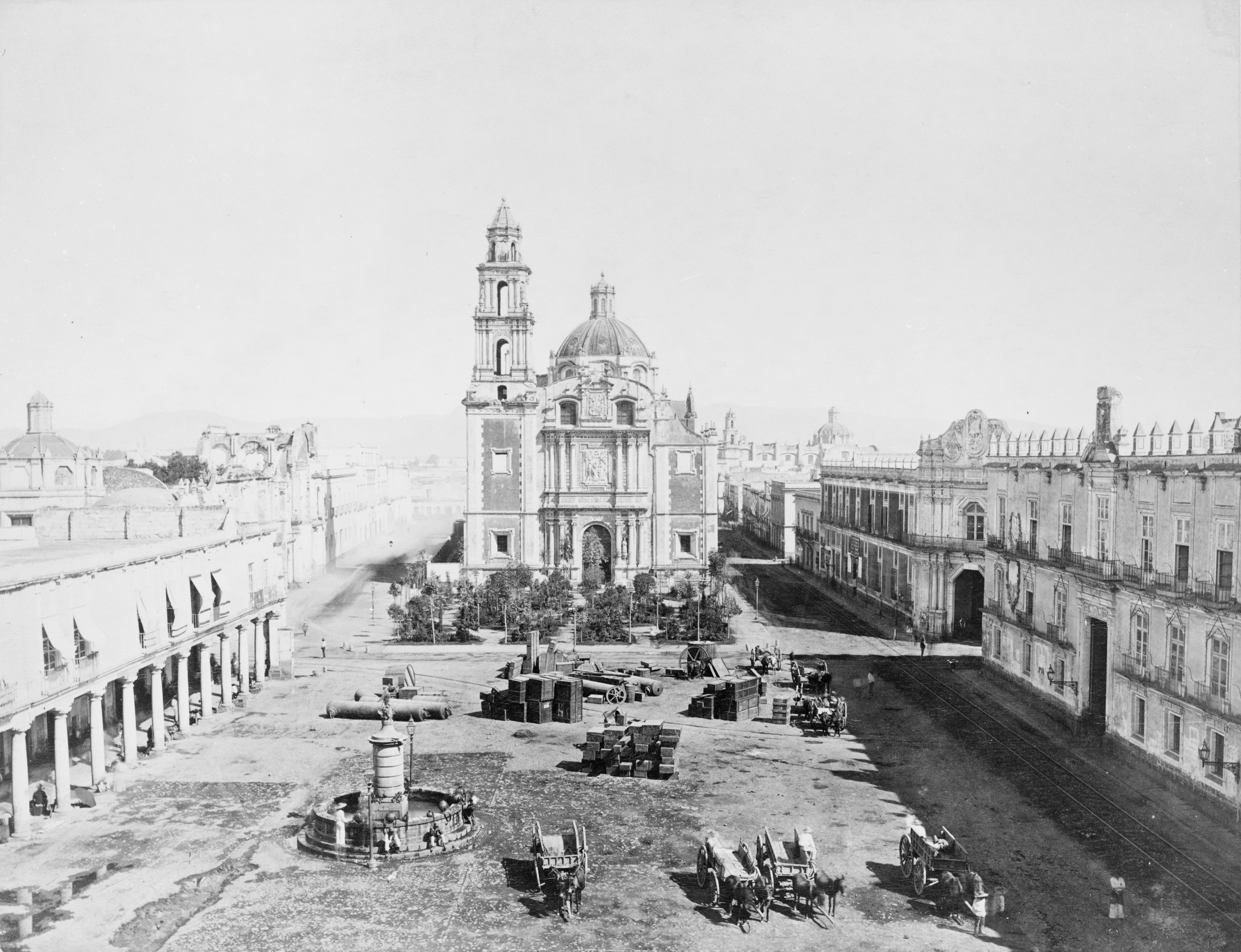
The plaza in 1900, by Abel Briquet. The palace is at the background.

== See also ==
- Plaza de Santo Domingo, the square where this palace is located.
