= Carl August Stetefeldt =

Carl August Stetefeldt (born in Holzhausen, near Gotha, Germany, 28 September 1838; died in Oakland, California, 17 March 1896) was an American mining engineer.

== Biography ==
His father was a Lutheran clergyman who moved the family to Hörselgau in 1847 where, in addition to his clerical work, he ran a school to prepare students for entering a gymnasium. His son was among the students, and entered the gymnasium in Gotha in 1852. In a rebellious act, Stetefeldt escaped the study of Hebrew there, being more attracted to the natural sciences. With other students, he founded the Naturwissenschaftliche Verein der Gymnasiasten zu Gotha. In 1858, he entered the University of Göttingen, and in 1860 the mining school in Clausthal, where he graduated in 1862.

Directly after his graduation, he was commissioned to investigate a problem in copper processing at the government works in the Harz. After visiting Freiberg, Mansfeld, Stolberg, and other metallurgical centers, he managed, for a brief period, a small copper plant in Bohemia.

In 1863, he emigrated to the United States. There he started out as an assistant to Charles Joy, a chemistry professor at Columbia College in New York City. He then became an assistant in the office and field work of the consulting firm Adelberg & Raymond. In addition to Stetefeldt, the firm employed many graduates from German schools, among them Hermann Credner, Anton Eilers, Otto H. Hahn, and Albert Arents. Stetefeldt was distinguished by a possession of a knowledge of mathematics and chemistry much beyond the usual equipment of a mining engineer or metallurgist, and at the same time an exceptionally wide scientific and literary, as well as technical, culture.

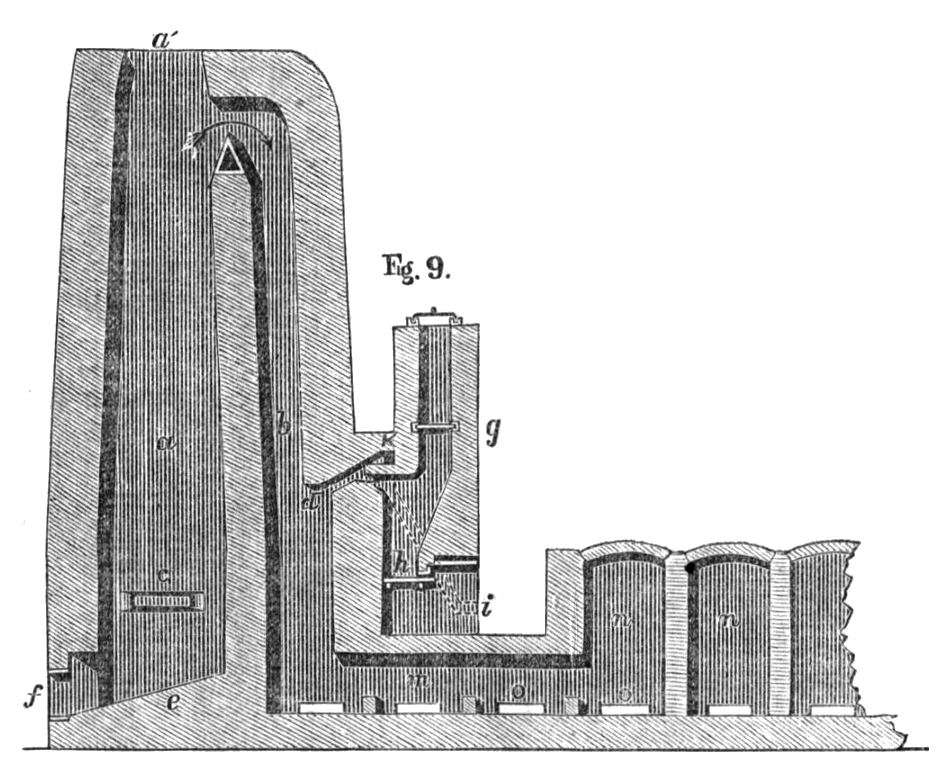
Stetefeldt roasting furnace

In 1865, he founded with John H. Boalt an assay office and consulting firm in Austin, Nevada. There, after a failure involving construction of a lead smelter, he turned his attention to processing silver ores. The silver ores of the Reese River district were treated by preliminary chloridizing roasting and then pan amalgamation with the aid of chemicals. After experimentation, Stetefeldt introduced a new type of furnace in Reno, Nevada. The Stetefeldt furnace was a metallurgical milestone. After the introduction of this furnace, most of his career revolved it. The invention made him widely known in mining districts. It was extensively used in the western United States for the roasting of silver ores preparatory to the extraction of the metal by either amalgamation or lixiviation.

From 1870 to 1872 Stetefeldt resided in Europe. On his return to the United States, he married in San Francisco, California, where he resided until 1882, when he moved to New York City. In 1889, he moved to Oakland, California. He worked as a mining engineer and metallurgist, devoting himself principally to consultation. He was a member of the American Institute of Mining Engineers (AIME) from 1881, and was elected a vice-president in 1888 and 1895, and occupied the office at his death.

== Writings ==
Stetefeldt contributed about 20 papers to the Transactions of the AIME. He also wrote The Lixiviation of Silver Ores with Hyposulphite Solutions (New York, 1888). He made numerous contributions to scientific literature outside the Transactions, which were published in Germany and in the United States. These papers dealt with topics inside and outside of his specialization. Heliology and selenology were subjects which he studied with special interest, and on which he speculated with ingenuity as well as learning.
