= Arquerite =

Naturally occurring alloy

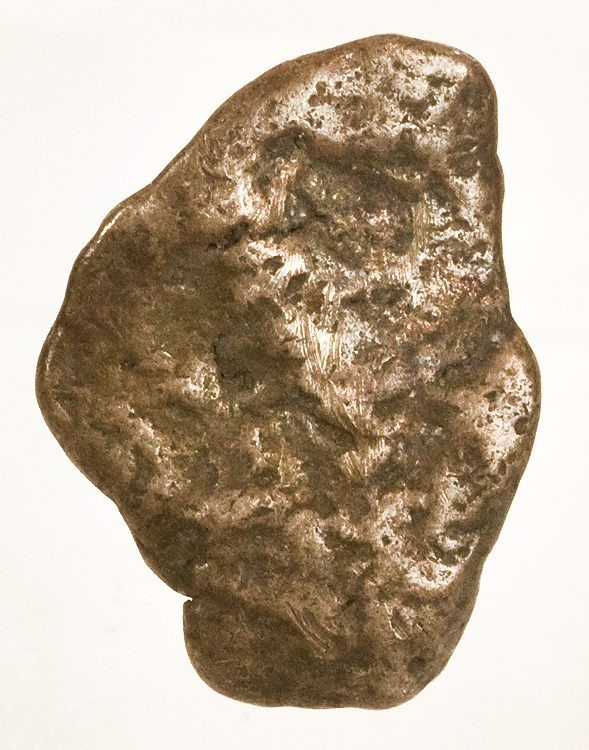

General
- Category: Native element minerals
- Formula: (Ag,Hg)
- Crystal system: Cubic

Identification
- Color: Silver-white

Arquerite is a naturally occurring alloy of silver with mercury. It is a very rare mineral, consisting of a silver-rich variety of amalgam, containing about 87% silver and 13% mercury. Arquerite has been reported from only four localities worldwide, two in Chile and two in British Columbia, Canada. Other names for arquerite include argental mercury, mercurian silver, and silver amalgam.

== Localities ==
=== Canada ===
- Vital Creek, Omenica Mining Division, British Columbia, Canada
- Kwanika Creek placers, Kwanika Creek, Omenica Mining Division, British Columbia, Canada

=== Chile ===
- La Rosilla mine, Yerbas Buenas, Cerro Blanco district, Copiapó Province, Atacama Region, Chile
- Arqueros Ag Mining District, La Serena, Elqui Province, Coquimbo Region, Chile
