= Pan amalgamation =

Metallurgical process: extraction of silver by amalgamation

The pan amalgamation process is a method to extract silver from ore, using salt and copper(II) sulfate in addition to mercury. The process was widely used from 1609 through the 19th century; it is no longer used.

The patio process had been used to extract silver from ore since its invention in 1557. One drawback of the patio process was the long treatment time, usually weeks. Alvaro Alonso Barba invented the faster pan process (in Spanish the cazo or fondo process) in 1609 in Potosí, Bolivia, in which ore was mixed with salt and mercury (and sometimes copper(II) sulfate) and heated in shallow copper vessels. The treatment time was reduced to 10 to 20 hours. Whether patio or pan amalgamation was used at a particular location often depended on climate (warmer conditions speeded the patio process) and the availability and cost of fuel to heat the pans.

The amount of salt and copper(II) sulfate varied from one-quarter to ten pounds of one or the other, or both, per ton of ore treated. The loss of mercury in amalgamation processes was generally one to two times the weight of silver recovered.

== Washoe process ==
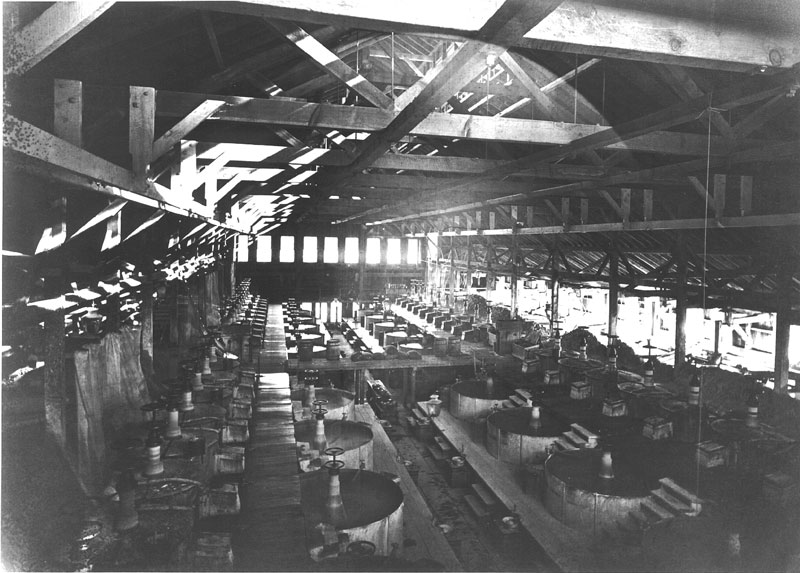
Amalgamation pans in a mill on the Comstock Lode, Virginia City, Nevada, 1900

The Washoe process, a variation of pan amalgamation, was developed in the 1860s by Almarin B. Paul and others, to work the ore from the Comstock Lode in Nevada, United States (Washoe was an early name for the area and the local tribe who still exists today; see Washoe Valley). In the Washoe process, the copper pans were replaced by iron tanks with mechanical agitators. Each tank ("pan") was circular, and commonly held 1,200 to 1,500 pounds of ore that had been crushed to sand size. Water was added to make a pulp, and 60 to 70 pounds of mercury, along with one-half to three pounds each of salt (sodium chloride) and bluestone (copper(II) sulfate) were also added. A circular iron plate called a muller was mounted on a vertical shaft and lowered into the pan, and was rotated to provide both agitation and additional grinding. Heat was delivered to the pans by steam pipes. The iron filings worn from the muller and pan proved to be an essential ingredient in the process.

== Reese River process ==
A variation of the Washoe process was developed in the Reese River mining district around Austin, Nevada. The Washoe process was found not to work well for ores with arsenic or antimony sulfides, or with galena or sphalerite. In 1869, Carl A. Stetefeldt of Reno found that roasting the ore with salt converted the silver sulfides to silver chlorides, which could then be recovered in amalgamation pans. The process was introduced in the Reese River District in 1879, with great success.

Other silver-mining districts using the Reese River process included Georgetown, Colorado, Caribou, Colorado, Silver Cliff, Colorado, and Butte, Montana.

== See also ==
- Amalgam (chemistry)
- Dental amalgam
- Patio process
