= Alvaro Alonso Barba =

Spanish Catholic priest and metallurgist

Alvaro Alonso Barba was a Catholic priest and metallurgist born in Lepe, a town in the province of Seville, in Andalusia, Spain, in 1569. He was baptized on November 15, 1569, which, according to the customs of Spain at that time, indicates that he was born a few days earlier. Antonio (1786) says, "Baeticus ex oppido Lepe, apud Potosi"; hence Barba is assumed to be of Andalusian origin, from the ancient Roman province of Baetica. He held a degree in theology and traveled to Peru around 1606, holding priestly positions in churches in various localities.

He lived at Potosí during the period when its silver mines were most productive and luxury among the Spanish residents and mine owners had nearly reached its height. Barba divided his time between his priestly duties and a close study of the ores of this region and their treatment. There had been, since 1570, a complete revolution in the treatment of silver ores, through the application of mercury, and a number of improvements followed, of which Barba had knowledge.

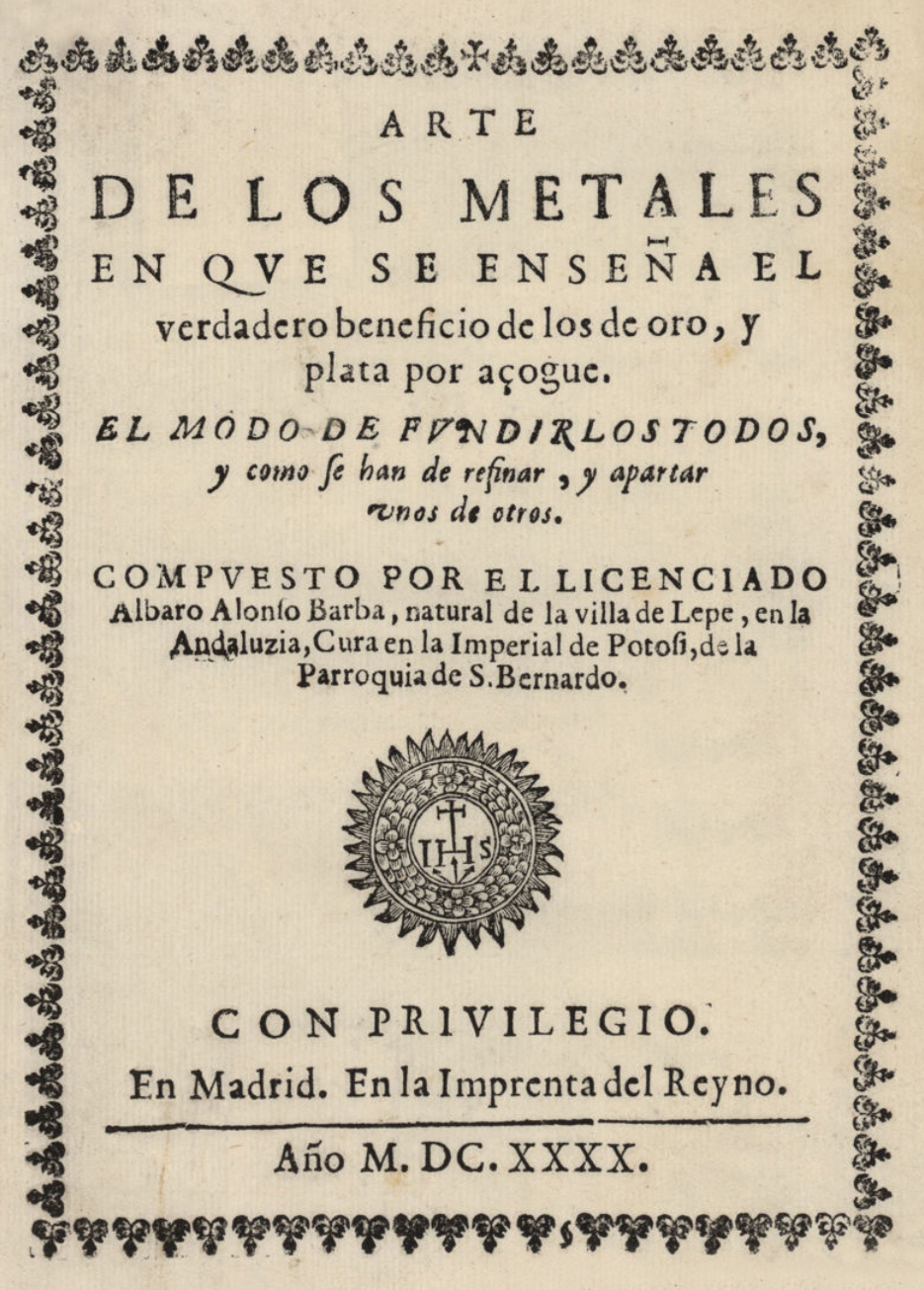
Cover of the first edition of the Alvaro Alonso Barba book, Arte de los metales, The Art of Metals

As indicated in his book, he also dedicated himself to conducting experiments related to alchemy. In 1609, in an attempt to solidify mercury, he tested the effect of various substances, observing that when he used powdered silver ore, metallic silver appeared along with the mercury. He correctly interpreted that it was not a transmutation, but rather that the silver came from the ore and could be extracted using mercury. He invented the pan amalgamation process (in Spanish the cazo or fondo process) for extracting silver from ore by mixing it with salt and mercury and heating it in shallow copper vessels. In 1640 he published in Madrid a book entitled Arte de los Metales, the earliest work on South American ores and minerals. It includes information on mineral localities in Bolivia. The book has been republished in Spanish, French, English and German.

Alvaro Alonso Barba died in the town of Triana, in the province of Seville, on October 25, 1662.
