= Moschellandsbergite =

Isometric mineral made up of a silver-white amalgam of mercury and silver

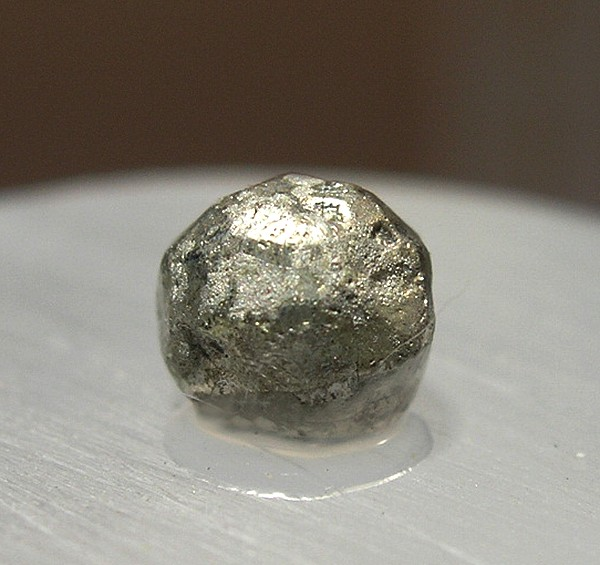

General
- Category: Metals and intermetallic alloys
- Formula: silver amalgam, Ag_{2}Hg_{3}
- IMA symbol: Mlb
- Strunz classification: 1.AD.15d
- Crystal system: Isometric
- Crystal class: Tetartoidal (23) (same H-M symbol)
- Space group: I23
- Unit cell: a = 10.04 Å, Z = 10

Identification
- Color: white, tarnishes grey
- Cleavage: brittle
- Mohs scale hardness: 3.5
- Luster: metallic
- Specific gravity: 13.48

Moschellandsbergite is a rare isometric mineral made up of a silver-white amalgam of mercury and silver with the chemical makeup Ag_{2}Hg_{3}.

It was first described in 1938 and named after Moschellandsberg Mountain near Obermoschel, Rhineland-Palatinate, Germany. It is considered a low-temperature hydrothermal mineral which occurs with metacinnabar, cinnabar, mercurian silver, tetrahedrite–tennantite, pyrite, sphalerite and chalcopyrite.
