= Pietro Gualdi =

Italian-American painter (1808–1857)

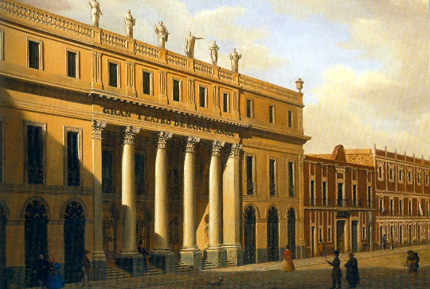
Gran Teatro Nacional de México/Teatro Santa Anna, Mexico City

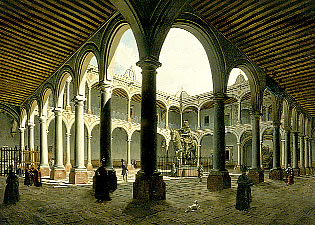
Interior of the Royal and Pontifical University of Mexico

Pietro Gualdi (22 July 1808 – 4 January 1857), aka Pedro Gualdi, was an Italian-born artist, panorama painter, architect and lithographer who was active in Mexico City from 1838 to about 1851, and in New Orleans from about 1851 to 1857.

== In Mexico ==
He was born in Carpi, Duchy of Modena and Reggio, and worked as a set designer and painter at La Scala in Milan before studying perspective, painting, and theater design at the Milan Academy of Arts in about 1834–1835. His new occupation as scene painter enabled him to travel to Mexico around 1838 with an Italian opera company. After his 13 years in Mexico, he lived in New Orleans for the rest of his life. As Pedro Gualdi in Mexico, he was a prolific artist, sketching and painting Mexico City's architecture, landmarks, and scenery. He produced an album of lithographs, "Monumentos de Méjico" which was published by Massé y Decaen of Mexico City in 1841. He taught perspective at the Academia de San Carlos in Mexico City in 1850, having Casimiro Castro as one of his students.

He "created precise renditions of major monuments and urban spaces what are not about exotic strangeness but instead emphasize the capital's grandeur and order." In 1841, he produced a valuable historical document in the form of a book of lithographs titled "Monumentos de Mejico, tomados del natural y litografiados por Pedro Gualdi pintor de perspectiva obsequio a los señores abonados", lithographed and published by Agustín Massé and Jean Decaen Callejon. The thirteen plates portrayed the 'Catedral', 'Plaza de So. Domingo y Aduana', 'Exterior de Na. Sa. de Guadalupe', 'Interior de la Universidad', 'Interior de la Mineria', 'Colegio de Mineria', 'Interior de Catedral', 'Santuario de Na. Sa. de Guadalupe', 'Paseo de la Independencia', 'Patio del convento de Na, S. de la Merced', 'Camara de los Diputados' and the 'Casa Municipal'. The book proved so popular that a second revised edition was published in 1841–42. In 1842, he produced an oil painting panorama of Mexico City that resulted in four lithographs of the city as seen from the tower of the church of St. Augustine. He made sketches and paintings of U.S. troops entering Mexico City in the War of 1846–48.

During the Mexican–American War, Gualdi's work was copied by some U.S. publishers, both to help the war effort and for profit, a view of the Military College at Chapultepec and a bird's-eye view of the Zócalo of Mexico City having military value. Gualdi worked with Agustín Massé, J. Decaen, and Michaud on the ca. 1851 "Album Pintoresco de la República Mexicana".

== In New Orleans ==
Gualdi seems to have moved to New Orleans by December 1851, where in March 1854, he displayed his sweeping panorama of the city. It was an oil painting measuring 20 by 128 feet, shown in an octagonal building designed by Gualdi himself and located at the corner of St. Charles and Poydras Streets. He had worked on the panorama from January to March 1853, using the lofty tower of St. Patrick's Church as a vantage point. Newspapers hailed the painting that showed some ten miles of surrounding countryside and depicted the buildings of the city “with wonderful accuracy.” The First Presbyterian Church of New Orleans commissioned Gualdi in 1855 to render a large gouache painting of Henry Howard's design for their new sanctuary, which was erected facing Lafayette Square (demolished in 1938 to erect the Federal Building). His last known work was to design a circular marble tomb for the Italian Mutual Benevolent Society in St. Louis Cemetery I in New Orleans, and he was one of the first to be entombed there after dying from malaria. These ornate tombs were featured in the 1969 film Easy Rider.
