= Amalgam (chemistry) =

Alloy of mercury with another metal

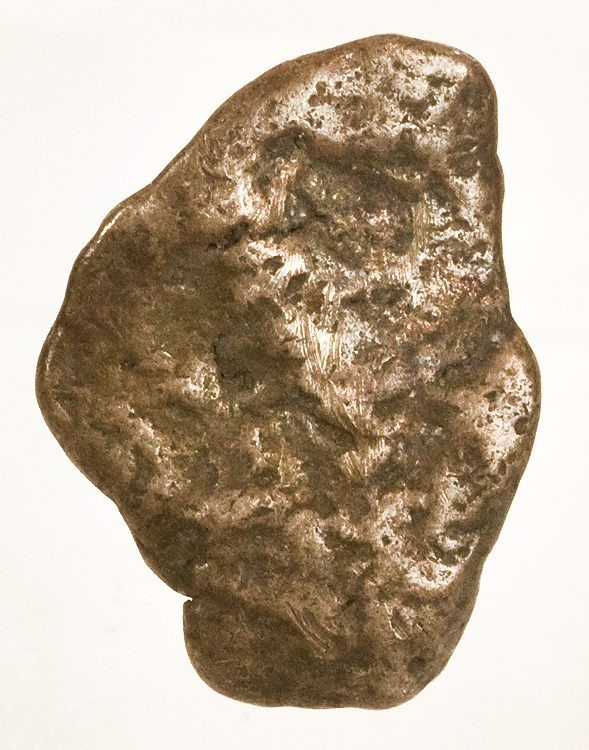
Arquerite, a natural amalgam of silver and mercury

An amalgam is an alloy of mercury with another metal. It may be a liquid, a soft paste or a solid, depending upon the proportion of mercury. These alloys are formed through metallic bonding, with the electrostatic attractive force of the conduction electrons working to bind all the positively charged metal ions together into a crystal lattice structure. Many metals can form amalgams with mercury, with some notable exceptions including iron, platinum, tungsten, and tantalum. Gold-mercury amalgam is used in the extraction of gold from ore, and dental amalgams are made with metals such as silver, copper, indium, tin and zinc.

== Formation ==
Mercury is a relatively abundant, naturally occurring element in the Earth. It forms a strong chemical bond with sulfur and is most often found in the form of cinnabar, or mercury sulfide. There are an estimated 600,000 tonnes of cinnabar deposits world-wide, and annual global production is around 6,000 tonnes, as of 2024. Amalgams of silver are found in naturally-occurring minerals, including schachnerite, paraschachnerite, moschellandsbergite, arquerite, and eugenite. Gold amalgams include aurihydrargyrumite and weishanite. Small concretions of calomel, or mercury chloride, are sometimes found in mines. The amalgam mercury telluride, or coloradoite, may be found in small quantities.

Many metals will readily dissolve during contact with mercury at room temperature, and the solubility increases with temperature. The most soluble elements are indium, thallium, cadmium, and caesium. Mercury has a high electronegativity, causing it to form a number of metallic amalgams. These reactions are typically exothermic. The resulting amalgam may be liquid or solid at room temperature, depending on the preponderance of mercury. Lower mass metals are less likely to form amalgams compared to heavier metals. Elements such as platinum, aluminum, and copper are not readily soluble in mercury. Among the least soluble is iron; historically, iron flasks were used for the transport of mercury. Because mercury is a harmful toxin, it requires special handling during amalgam production.

Prior to the invention of electroplating, amalgam gilding was a common technique for gilding metal surfaces. This method was used to gild silver as early as the third to first centuries BC in China. However, the results of amalgam gilding of silver were often less satisfactory than with the similar process with gold usually referred to as fire gilding. The technique of amalgam gilding is still practiced in the Morimoto workshop in Kyoto, Japan.

== Important amalgams ==
=== Alkali metals ===
For the alkali metals, amalgamation is exothermic, and distinct chemical forms can be identified, such as KHg and KHg_{2}. KHg is a gold-coloured compound with a melting point of 178 °C, and KHg_{2} a silver-coloured compound with a melting point of 278 °C. These amalgams are very sensitive to air and water, but can be worked with under dry nitrogen. The Hg-Hg distance is around 300 picometres, Hg-K around 358 pm.

Phases K_{5}Hg_{7} and KHg_{11} are also known; rubidium, strontium and barium undecamercurides are known and isostructural. Sodium amalgam (NaHg_{2}) has a different structure, with the mercury atoms forming hexagonal layers, and the sodium atoms a linear chain which fits into the holes in the hexagonal layers, but the potassium atom is too large for this structure to work in KHg_{2}.

Sodium amalgam is produced as a byproduct of the mercury-cell chloralkali process. It is used as an important reducing agent in organic and inorganic chemistry. With water, it decomposes into concentrated sodium hydroxide solution, hydrogen and mercury, which can then return to the chloralkali process anew. If absolutely water-free alcohol is used instead of water, an alkoxide of sodium is produced instead of the alkali solution.

=== Post-transition metals ===
Aluminium can form an amalgam through a reaction with mercury. Aluminium amalgam may be prepared by either grinding aluminium pellets or wire in mercury, or by allowing aluminium wire or foil to react with a solution of mercuric chloride. This amalgam is used as a reagent to reduce compounds, such as the reduction of imines to amines. The aluminium is the ultimate electron donor, and the mercury serves to mediate the electron transfer. The reaction itself and the waste from it contain mercury, so special safety precautions and disposal methods are needed. As an environmentally friendlier alternative, hydrides or other reducing agents can often be used to accomplish the same synthetic result. Another environmentally friendly alternative is an alloy of aluminium and gallium which similarly renders the aluminium more reactive by preventing it from forming an oxide layer.

Since the amalgam destroys the aluminium oxide layer which protects metallic aluminium from oxidizing in-depth (as in iron rusting), even small amounts of mercury can seriously corrode aluminium. For this reason, mercury is not allowed aboard an aircraft under most circumstances because of the risk of it forming an amalgam with exposed aluminium parts in the aircraft.

Tin amalgam was developed as a reflective mirror coating on the Venetian island of Murano during the 16th century by the Del Gallo glassmakers. It became the dominant form of reflective coating through the 19th century. They were manufactured by sliding the glass over a foil of tin flooded with mercury, with the resulting reflecting layer consisting of 75% tin and 25% mercury. The mercury vapors from this process made the work place unhealthy. The mercury in these mirrors gradually evaporated over time, forming a vapor in the room where they were mounted, although well below toxic levels. Production of this style of mirror ceased around 1900.

Lead forms an amalgam when filings are mixed with mercury. It is listed as a naturally occurring alloy called leadamalgam in the Nickel–Strunz classification.

=== Other metals ===
Zinc amalgam finds use in organic synthesis (e.g., for the Clemmensen reduction). It is the reducing agent in the Jones reductor, used in analytical chemistry. Formerly the zinc plates of dry batteries were amalgamated with a small amount of mercury to prevent deterioration in storage. It is a binary solution (liquid-solid) of mercury and zinc.

An 8.5% thallium amalgam forms a eutectic system with a freezing point of −60 °C, which is lower than that of pure mercury (−38.8 °C) so it has found a use in low temperature thermometers.

Refined gold, when finely ground and brought into contact with mercury where the surfaces of both metals are clean, amalgamates readily and quickly forms alloys ranging from AuHg_{2} to Au_{8}Hg.

=== Other amalgams ===
Although ammonium is technically not a metal, the term "ammonium amalgam" is used to describe a grey, soft, spongy mass NH_{4}Hg_{n}, derived from the reduction of aqueous solutions of ammonia or ammonium salts with a mercury cathode. It was discovered in 1808 by Thomas Johann Seebeck, near-contemporaneously with Jöns Jakob Berzelius and Magnus Martin af Pontin, followed soon after by Humphry Davy. Its true structure is unknown; it has variously been theorized to be an ammonium radical amalgam (NH^{•}_{4})Hg_{n} or a Zintl phase analog (NH^{+}_{4})Hg^{–}_{n}. The "ammonium hydride amalgam" (NH^{+}_{4})(HHg^{–}_{n}) is speculated to be an intermediate during amalgam formation. Ammonium amalgam is indefinitely stable near −40 °C, but decomposes readily at room temperature, as well as in contact with water or alcohol:

2 (NH^{•}_{4})Hg_{n} → 2 NH_{3} + H_{2} + 2n Hg

The analogous tetraalkylammonium amalgams NR_{4}Hg_{n} are more stable.

=== Dental amalgam ===
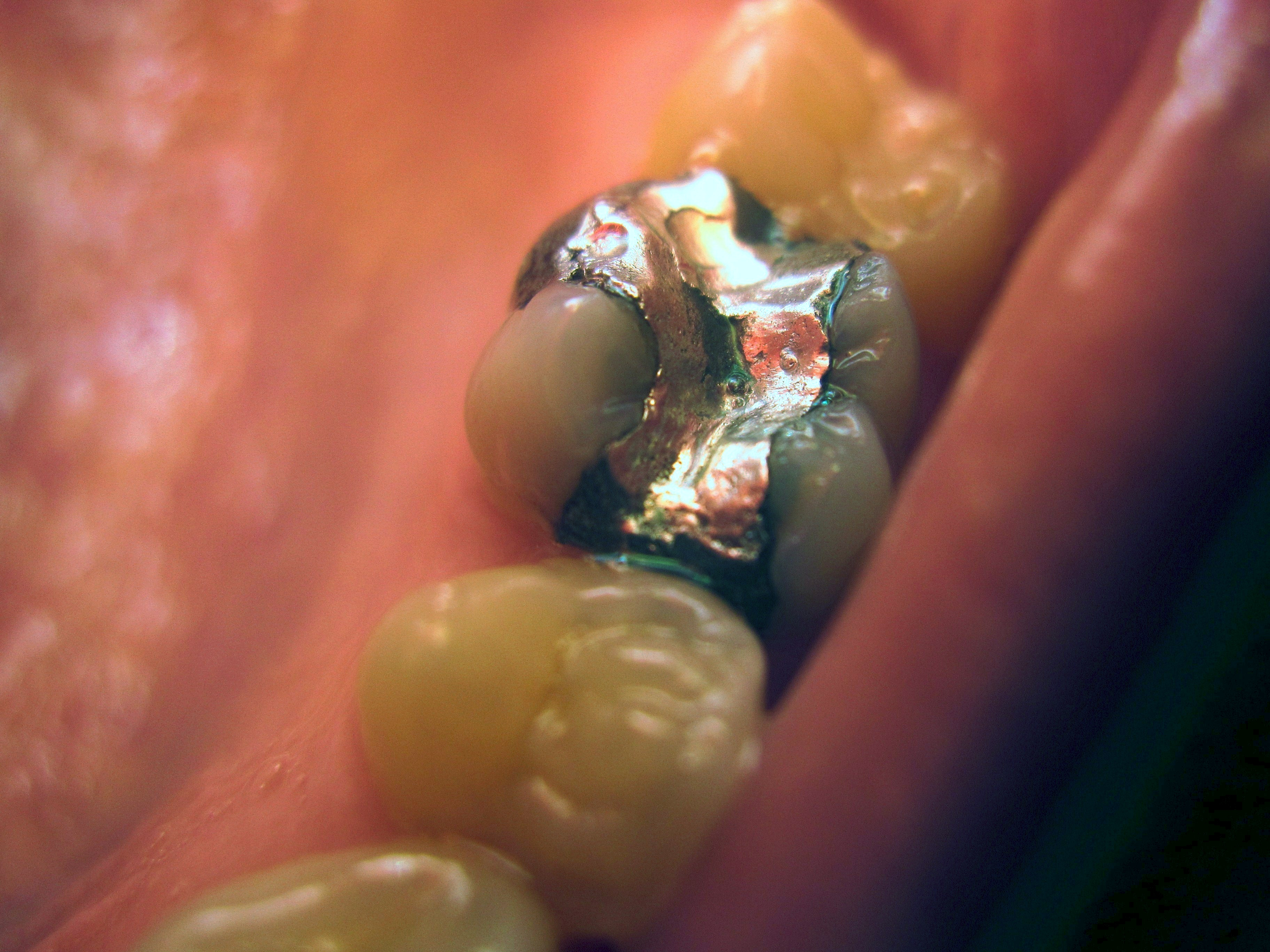
An amalgam dental filling

Dentistry has used alloys of mercury with metals such as silver, copper, indium, tin and zinc. Amalgam is an "excellent and versatile restorative material" and is used in dentistry because it is inexpensive and relatively easy to use and manipulate during placement. It remains soft for a short time so it can be packed to fill any irregular volume, and then forms a hard compound.

There is a long history of dental amalgams. During the Tang dynasty, it appeared in the Chinese materia medica of Su Kung in 659 AD. The German municipal physician Johannes Stockerus recommended the use of amalgam as a filling material in 1528. Dental amalgam was formally invented in 1818 by Parisian physician Louis Nicolas Regnart. The first American dental society, the American Society of Dental Surgeons, was dissolved in 1856 over controversy about the use of gold or silver amalgams.

Amalgam possesses greater longevity when compared to other direct restorative materials, such as composite. However, this difference has decreased with continual development of composite resins. Amalgam is typically compared to resin-based composites because many applications are similar and many physical properties and costs are comparable.

Dental amalgam has been studied and is generally considered to be safe for humans, though the validity of some studies and their conclusions have been questioned. In July 2018 the EU, in consideration of the persistent pollution and environmental toxicity of amalgam's mercury, prohibited amalgam for dental treatment of children under 15 years and of pregnant or breastfeeding women. During 2020 in the US, the FDA has recommended against the use of dental amalgams in certain high risk groups, including children, pregnant women, and women planning to become pregnant.

== Use in mining ==
Mercury has been used in gold and silver mining because of the convenience and the ease with which mercury and the precious metals will amalgamate. In gold placer mining, in which minute specks of gold are washed from sand or gravel deposits, mercury was often used to separate the gold from other heavy minerals. Mercury amalgamation was first used on silver ores with the development of the patio process in Mexico in 1554. Additional amalgamation processes have been created for processing silver ores, including pan amalgamation and the Washoe process.

=== Gold extraction ===
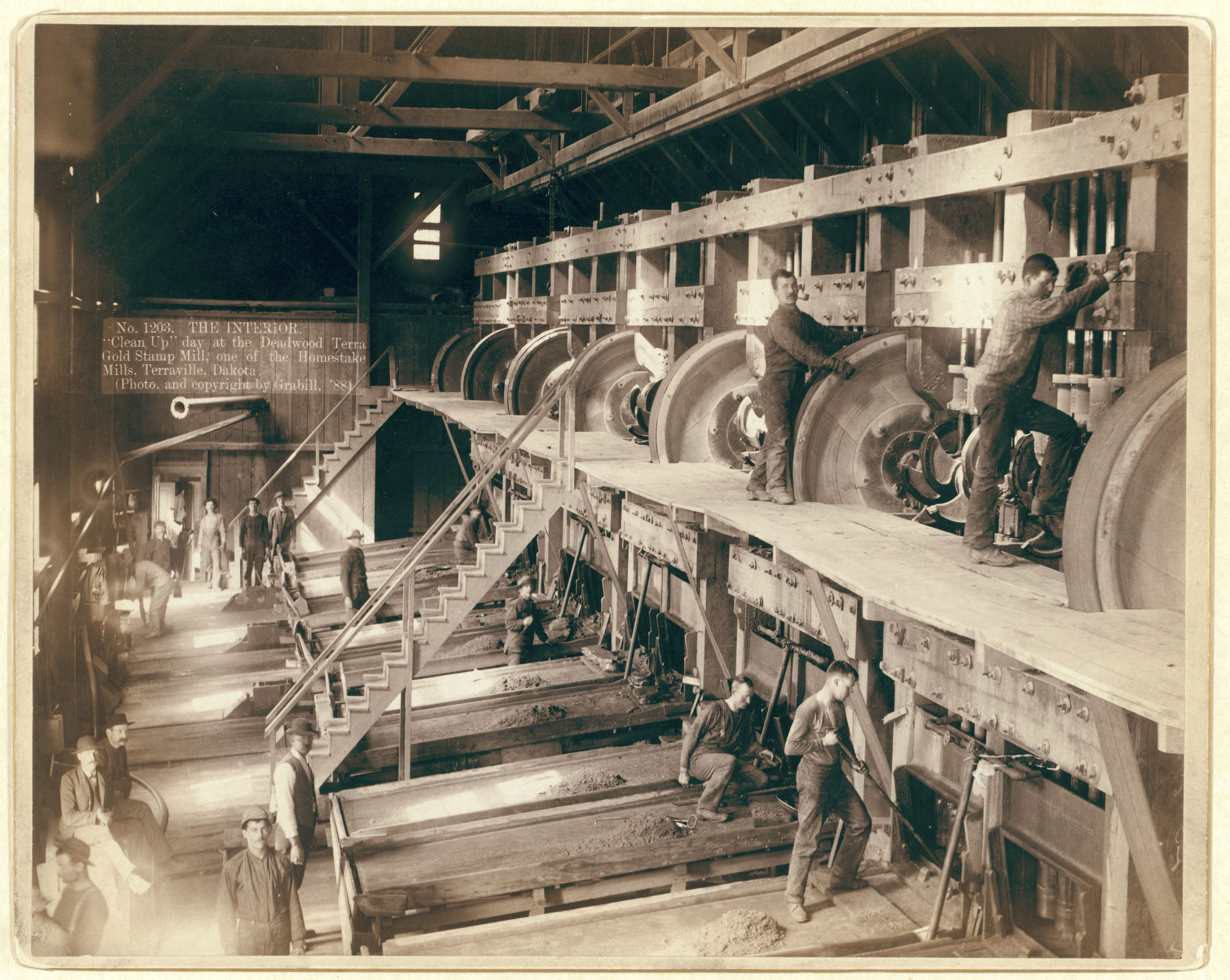
Interior of the Deadwood Terra Gold Stamp Mill. Crushed ore is washed over mercury-coated copper sheets, and fine gold particles form an amalgam with the mercury. The amalgam was scraped off and the gold then separated from the amalgam by heating and evaporating the mercury, which was then recovered by a condenser for reapplication to the plates.

Gold amalgam has proved effective where gold fines ("flour gold") would not be extractable from ore using hydro-mechanical methods. Large amounts of mercury were used in placer mining, where deposits composed largely of decomposed granite slurry were separated in long runs of "riffle boxes", with mercury dumped in at the head of the run. The waste ore was then transferred down the trough, and gold in the waste amalgamated with the mercury. The amalgam formed is a heavy dull gray solid mass.

After all of the practical metal had been taken out from the ore, the mercury was dispensed down a long copper trough, which formed a thin coating of mercury on the exterior. This coating would then be scraped off and refined by evaporation to get rid of the mercury, leaving behind somewhat high-purity gold.

The use of mercury in 19th century placer mining in California, now prohibited, has caused extensive pollution problems in riverine and estuarine environments, ongoing to this day. Sometimes substantial slugs of amalgam are found in downstream river and creek bottoms by amateur wet-suited miners seeking gold nuggets with the aid of an engine-powered water vacuum/dredge mounted on a float.

Where stamp mills were used to crush gold-bearing ore to fines, a part of the extraction process involved the use of mercury-wetted copper plates, over which the crushed fines were washed. A periodic scraping and re-mercurizing of the plate resulted in amalgam for further processing. Amalgam obtained by either process was then heated in a distillation retort, recovering the mercury for reuse and leaving behind the gold. As this released mercury vapors to the atmosphere, the process could induce adverse health effects and long term pollution.

Today, mercury amalgamation has been replaced by other methods to recuperate gold and silver from ore in developed nations. Hazards of mercurial toxic waste have played a major role in the phasing out of the mercury amalgamation processes. Mercury amalgamation is still regularly used by small-scale gold placer miners (often illegally), particularly in developing countries.

== Amalgam probe ==
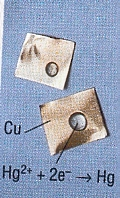
The amalgam probe

Mercury salts are, compared to mercury metal and amalgams, highly toxic due to their solubility in water. The presence of these salts in water can be detected with a probe that uses the readiness of mercury ions to form an amalgam with copper. A nitric acid solution of salts under investigation is applied to a piece of copper foil, and any mercury ions present will leave spots of silvery-coloured amalgam. Silver ions leave similar spots but are easily washed away, making this a means of distinguishing silver from mercury.

The redox reaction involved where mercury oxidizes the copper is:

Hg^{2+} + Cu → Hg + Cu^{2+}.
