= Casimiro Castro =

Mexican artist

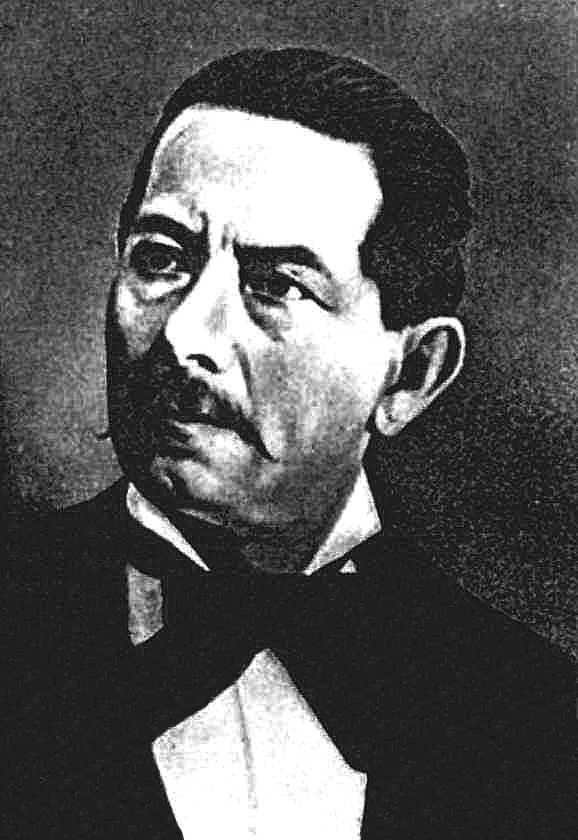
- Born: 24 April 1826; Tepetlaoztoc
- Died: 8 January 1889 (aged 62); Mexico City, Mexico
- Education: Academy of San Carlos
- Occupations: Painter, lithographer

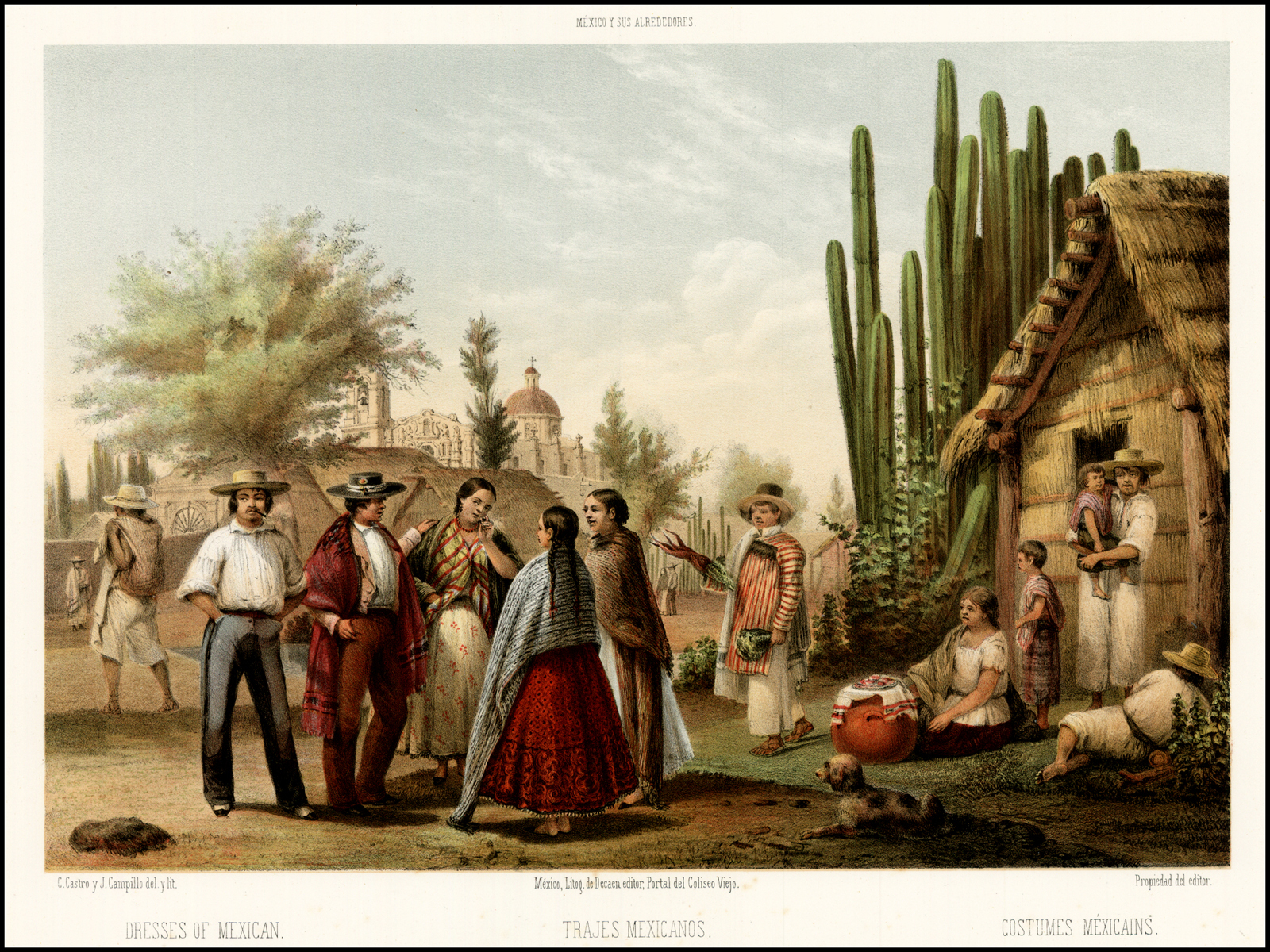
Mexicans in a rural scene outside Mexico City (1855)

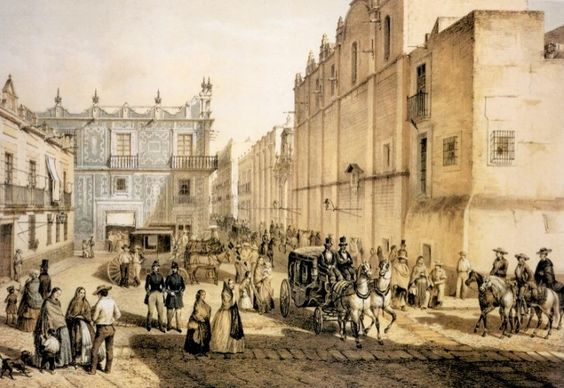
Guardiola Square (1855)

Casimiro Castro (24 April 1826 Tepetlaoxtoc – 8 January 1889 Mexico City), was a Mexican painter and lithographer, and is regarded as having been a leading graphic and landscape artist in 19th century Mexico.

== Biography ==
Casimiro, son of Cristóval Castro and Mariana Feliciana Blancas, was born shortly after Mexico acquired its independence and experienced a period of political and social upheaval marked by wars, foreign invasions and conflicts. His work is a graphic documentation of this important phase in the history of Mexico. Casimiro studied at the Academy of San Carlos in Mexico City under the Italian-born artist Pietro Gualdi, and was also influenced by Claudio Linati Prevost, who introduced lithography to Mexico. Castro's first lithographs appeared in religious and literary publications such as "The Mexican Museum" in 1843 and "El Gallo Pythagorean" 1845. In 1849 he produced illustrations for the memorial service of the hero of Mexican independence, Agustín de Iturbide.

His most important project was México y Sus Alrededores (Mexico and its Environs), published in Mexico in 1855, which included 42 plates of Mexico City and surroundings, with contributions from J. Campillo. The plates included aerial views drawn from balloons and rooftops. The work was given to Maximilian I of Mexico, as he prepared to become emperor of Mexico.

Castro's work records the changes in fashions in Mexico from republican austerity through the Industrial Revolution. According to Roberto Mayer in his "Nacimiento y Desarrollo del Album Mexico y Sus Alrededores", this book did not appear in true editions, and copies were printed when the market demanded. It was published in Mexico by 'Imprenta Lithographica de Decaen' in 1864.

Casimiro Castro and Sigogne produced the "Album del Ferrocarril Mexicano, Colección de Vistas Pintadas del Natural (Mexican Railroad Album)" containing 25 chromolithographic plates, with Antonio García Cubas writing the text. The work was intended to commemorate the inauguration of the first railway line that ran from the Gulf coast port of Veracruz to Mexico City. It depicted views and surrounding landscapes along the route of the railway, and was published in 1877 by Víctor Debray.

After his trip to Europe, Castro made prints of locations in Italy and Spain. He produced architectural drawings and prints of Mexican towns and interior designs, as well as posters for fairs and fashion houses, many of these showing Art Nouveau trends.
