= Iron–nickel alloy =

Group of alloys

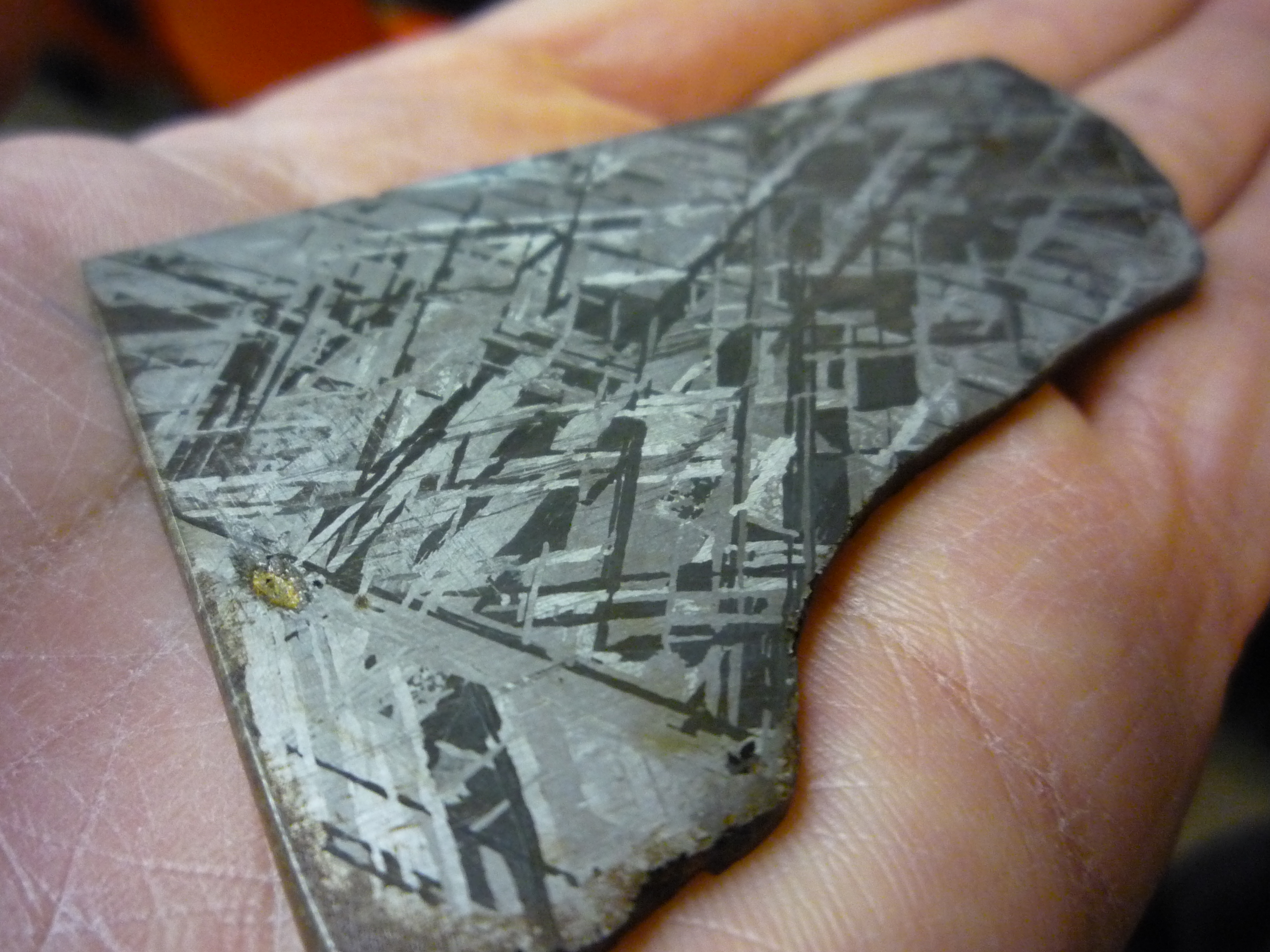
Widmanstätten pattern in NiFe octahedrite meteorite

An iron–nickel alloy or nickel–iron alloy, abbreviated FeNi or NiFe, is a group of alloys consisting primarily of the elements nickel (Ni) and iron (Fe). It is the main constituent of the "iron" planetary cores and iron meteorites. In chemistry, the acronym NiFe refers to an iron–nickel catalyst or component involved in various chemical reactions, or the reactions themselves; in geology, it refers to the main constituents of telluric planetary cores (including Earth's).

Some manufactured alloys of iron–nickel are called nickel steel or stainless steel. Depending on the intended use of the alloy, these are usually fortified with small amounts of other metals, such as chromium, cobalt, molybdenum, and titanium.

== Astronomy and geology ==
Iron and nickel are the most abundant elements produced during the final stage of stellar nucleosynthesis in massive stars. Heavier elements require other forms of nucleosynthesis, such as during a supernova or neutron star merger. Iron and nickel are the most abundant metals in metallic meteorites and in the dense metal cores of telluric planets, such as Earth.

Nickel–iron alloys occur naturally on Earth's surface as telluric iron or meteoric iron.

== Chemistry and metallurgy ==
The affinity of nickel atoms (atomic number 28) for iron (atomic number 26) results in natural occurring alloys and a large number of commercial alloys. The surfaces of these metallic compounds provide a complex electron environment for catalyzing chemical reactions.

In steel metallurgy, nickel is alloyed with iron since 1888 (date of Schneider et Cie's patent on nickel steel based on Jean Werth's research) to produce maraging steel and some low-alloy steels. Other technological uses include Invar and Mu-metal.

== Alloy summary ==
The following table is an overview of different iron–nickel alloys. Naturally occurring alloys are a type of mineral and called native elements or native metals. Some of the entries have more than one crystal structure (e.g. meteoric iron is a mixture of two crystal structures).

Name	Description	Chemical formula / Weight percent nickel
Antitaenite	An intermetallic compound found in meteorites	Fe_{3}Ni
Awaruite	A native intermetallic compound found in serpentinites and meteorites	Ni_{2}Fe to Ni_{3}Fe
Earth's core	Earth's core is composed of an iron–nickel alloy	about 5.5% Ni
Elinvar	A manufactured alloy whose elasticity does not change with temperature; 5% Cr	36% Ni
Invar	A steel manufactured to have a very low thermal expansion	36% Ni
Kamacite	A native metal found in meteoric iron	Fe_{[0.9]}Ni_{[0.1]}
Maraging steel	A strong, malleable variant of steel	15–25% Ni
Meteoric iron	A native combination of mostly kamacite and taenite, and minor amounts of tetrataenite, antitaenite, and awaruite	5–30% Ni
Mu-metal	An alloy manufactured to be highly permeable to magnetism	77% Ni
Planetary core	Planets, moons, and planetesimals can have cores of various iron–nickel alloys	various
Stainless steel	A variant of steel manufactured to be corrosion-resistant, with Cr as well as Ni	4–8% Ni
Taenite	A native metal found in meteorites	NiFe
Telluric iron	A native metal found on Earth (distinct from extraterrestrial irons)	0.05%–4% Ni
Tetrataenite	A native metal found in meteorites	FeNi

== See also ==
- Iron–nickel clusters
- KREEP
- Sial
- Sima
