= Meteoric iron =

Iron originating from a meteorite rather than from the Earth since formation

Meteoric iron (native iron)
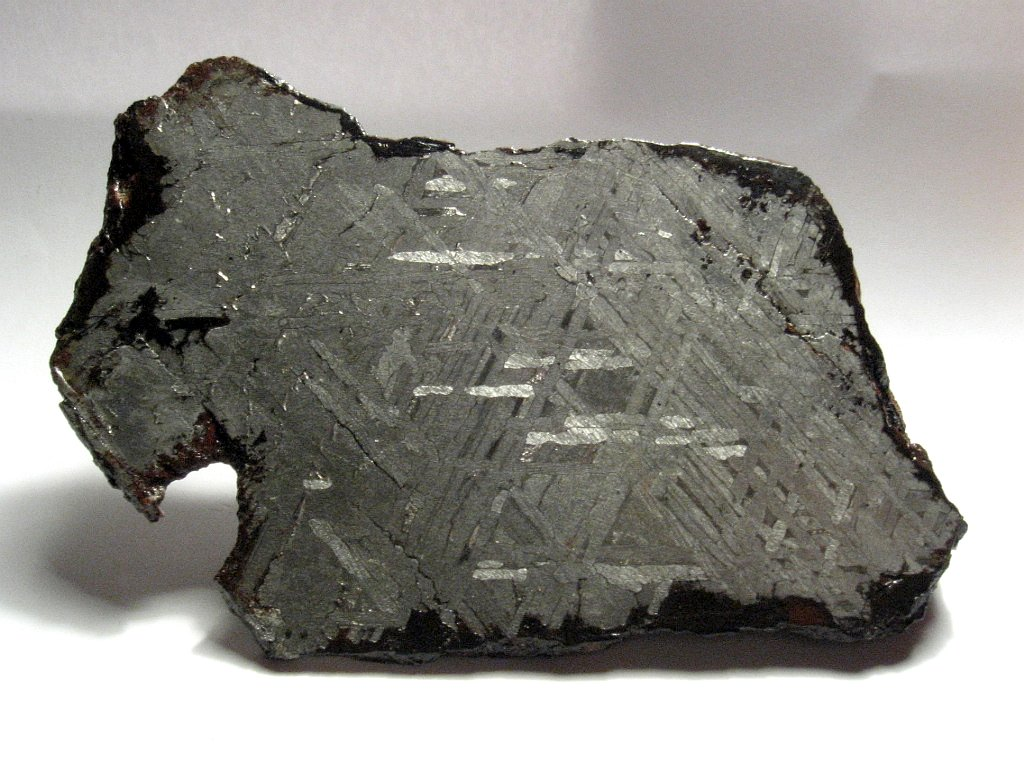
- Widmanstätten pattern on a 500g endcut from the Toluca iron meteorite

General
- Category: Native element mineral
- Formula: Fe and Ni in different ratios
- Space group: Different structures

Identification
- Luster: Metallic
- Diaphaneity: Opaque

Meteoric iron, sometimes meteoritic iron, is a native metal and early-universe protoplanetary-disk remnant found in meteorites and made from the elements iron and nickel, mainly in the form of the mineral phases kamacite and taenite. Meteoric iron makes up the bulk of iron meteorites but is also found in other meteorites. Apart from minor amounts of telluric iron, meteoric iron is the only naturally occurring native metal of the element iron (in metallic form rather than in an ore) on the Earth's surface.

== Mineralogy ==
The bulk of meteoric iron consists of taenite and kamacite. Taenite is a face-centered cubic and kamacite a body-centered cubic iron-nickel alloy. Meteoric iron can be distinguished from telluric iron by its microstructure and perhaps by its chemical composition also, since meteoritic iron contains more nickel and less carbon. Trace amounts of gallium and germanium in meteoric iron can be used to distinguish different meteorite types. The meteoric iron in stony iron meteorites is identical to the "gallium-germanium group" of the iron meteorites.

Overview over meteoric iron mineral phases
Mineral	Formula	Nickel (Mass-% Ni)	Crystal structure	Notes & references
Antitaenite	γ_{Low Spin}-(Ni,Fe)	20–40	face centered cubic	Only approved as a variety of taenite by the IMA
Kamacite	α-(Fe,Ni); Fe^{0+}_{0.9}Ni_{0.1}	5–10	body centered cubic	Same structure as ferrite
Taenite	γ-(Ni,Fe)	20–65	face centered cubic	Same structure as austenite
Tetrataenite	(FeNi)	48–57	tetragonal	

=== Structures ===
Meteoric iron forms a few different structures that can be seen by etching or in thin sections of meteorites. The Widmanstätten pattern forms when meteoric iron cools and kamacite is exsolved from taenite in the form of lamellas. Plessite is a more fine-grained intergrowth of the two minerals in between the lamella of the Widmanstätten pattern. Neumann lines are fine lines running through kamacite crystals that form through impact-related deformation.

== Cultural and historical usage ==
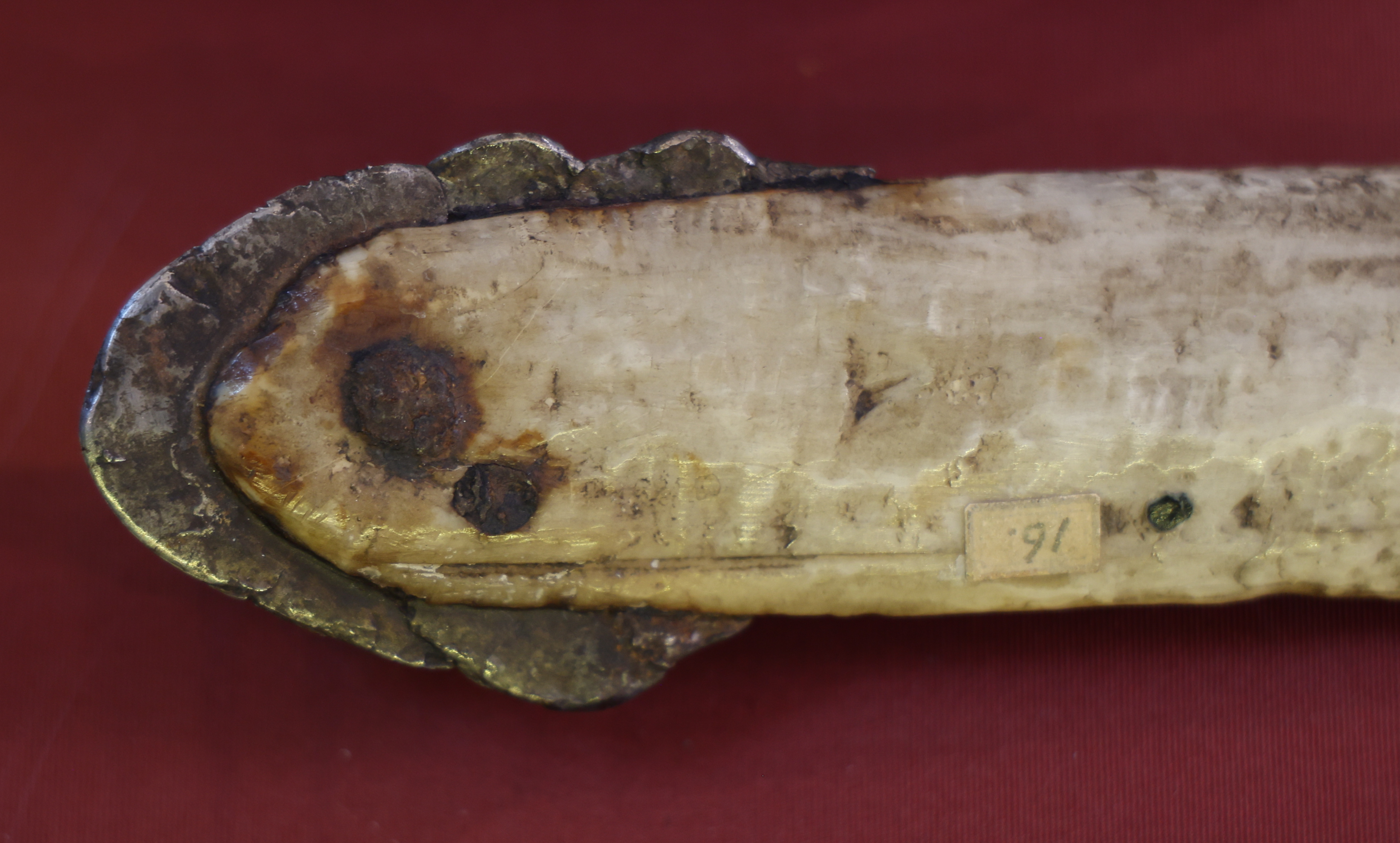
A lance made from a narwhal tusk with an iron head made from the Cape York meteorite.

Before the advent of iron smelting, meteoric iron was the only source of iron metal apart from minor amounts of telluric iron. Meteoric iron was already used before the beginning of the Iron Age to make cultural objects, tools and weapons.

=== Bronze Age ===
Iron in hieroglyphs
b i A F18 n pt
bjꜣ-n-p.t
literally "metal of the sky"

Many examples of iron working from the Bronze Age have been confirmed to be meteoritic in origin.

- In ancient Egypt an iron metal bead was found in a graveyard near Gerzeh that contained 7.5% Ni. Dated to around 3200 BC, geochemical analysis of the Gerzeh iron beads, based on the ratio of nickel to iron and cobalt, confirms that the iron was meteoritic in origin.
- In Mesopotamia, Sumer and Akkadian Empire, meteoric iron was considered a sacred material, used to create special ritual objects, and used long before the systematic processing of terrestrial iron. There was a special term for it, an-bar.
- Dated to around 2500 BC, an iron dagger from Alaca Höyük was confirmed to be meteoritic in origin through geochemical analysis.
- Dated to around 2300 BC, an iron pendant from Umm el-Marra in Syria was confirmed to be meteoritic in origin through geochemical analysis.
- Dated to around 1400 BC, an iron axe from Ugarit in Syria was found to be meteoritic in origin.
- Dated to around 1400 BC, several iron axes from Shang dynasty China were confirmed to be meteoritic in origin.
- Dated to around 1350 BC, an iron dagger, bracelet and headrest from the tomb of Tutankhamun were confirmed to be meteoritic in origin. The Tutankhamun dagger consists of similar proportions of metals (iron, nickel and cobalt) to a meteorite discovered in the area, deposited by an ancient meteor shower.
- Dated to around 900 BC, an arrowhead from Mörigen in Switzerland was confirmed to be made of meteoric iron whose composition suggested that it originated from the Kaali meteorite crater in Saaremaa, Estonia.

=== The Americas ===
- The Inuit used parts of the Cape York meteorite to make knives, harpoon tips, and lance heads. Large quantities of meteoric iron were known and used long before European contact.

=== Africa ===
- Fragments from the Gibeon meteorite were used for centuries by the Nama people of Namibia.

=== Asia ===
- There are reports of the use of meteorites for manufacture of various items in Tibet (see Thokcha).
- The Iron Man, a purported Tibetan Buddhist statue of Vaiśravaṇa, was likely carved from an ataxite meteorite. It has been speculated that it may be made from a fragment of the Chinga meteorite.

=== Modern Day ===
Even after the invention of smelting, meteoric iron was sometimes used where this technology was not available or metal was scarce. A piece of the Cranbourne meteorite was made into a horseshoe around 1854. Today meteoric iron is used in niche jewellery and knife production, but most of it is used for research, educational or collecting purposes.

== Atmospheric phenomena ==
Meteoric iron also has an effect on the Earth's atmosphere. When meteorites descend through the atmosphere, outer parts are ablated. Meteoric ablation is the source of many elements in the upper atmosphere. When meteoric iron is ablated, it forms a free iron atom that can react with ozone (O_{3}) to form FeO. This FeO may be the source of the orange spectrographic bands in the spectrum of the upper atmosphere.

== See also ==
- Glossary of meteoritics
