= Maysville roadcut =

Coordinates: 38°40′30″N 83°47′48″W

The Maysville roadcut, located in northeastern Kentucky, features upper Ordovician rock and fossils. Maysville is located in Mason County, Kentucky, and contains a large roadcut along U.S. Route 68. The cut was human-made in the 1950s and consists of rock that is roughly 450 million years old. Maysville provides an opportunity to observe the stratigraphy of the formations present of the Ordovician time period.

== Description ==
The roadcut is made up of three different formations: the Kope, Fairview, and Bellevue in ascending order. They are broken up into different layers that can be identified by different sediments and fossils present. The formations are made up primarily of shale and limestone. The abundance of each rock type differs amongst the three formations. Shale dominates in the Bellevue Formation. Limestone is most prevalent in Fairview Formation. A mix of limestone and shale is found in the Kope Formation.

There are a wide variety of invertebrate fossils that can be found at the Maysville roadcut, including trilobites, cephalopods, crinoids, gastropods, brachiopods, bryozoans. The abundance and presence of fossil types differs depending on the formation viewed. This is because of differences in ecosystems and environmental conditions at the time of each formation. The Ordovician was a time when the land in northeastern Kentucky was covered by a warm, shallow sea. The Cincinnati Arch, where Maysville can be found, was located about 23 degrees south of the equator.

Roadcuts such as Maysville roadcut have attracted those interested in collecting fossils, ranging from professionals at universities to amateurs in the area. Part of Maysville fossil collecting is fossil identification. Fossil identification books for Ohio and the Cincinnati area can serve as a resource.

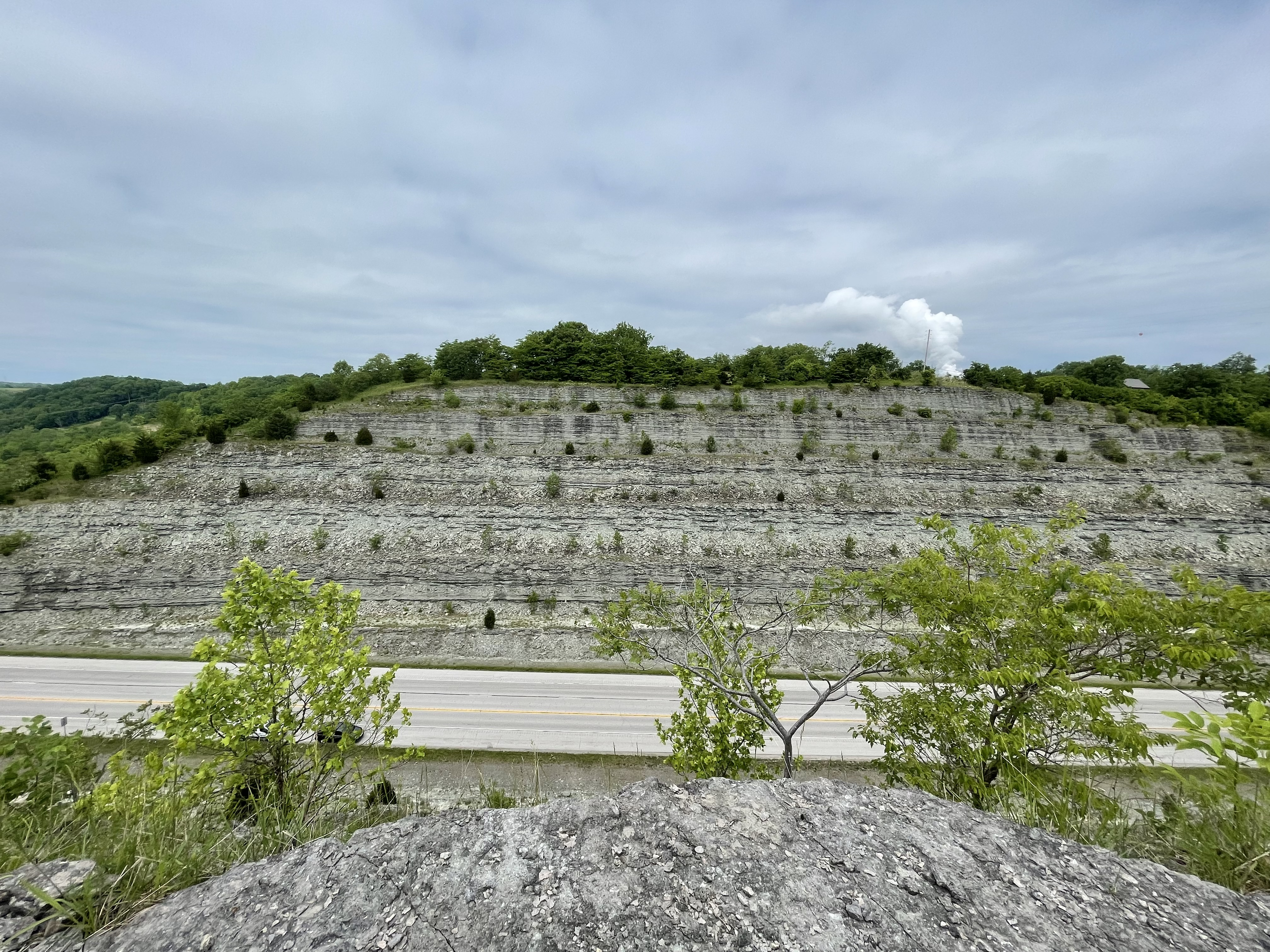
Overview of the Maysville roadcut showing all three formations present.

== Kope Formation ==
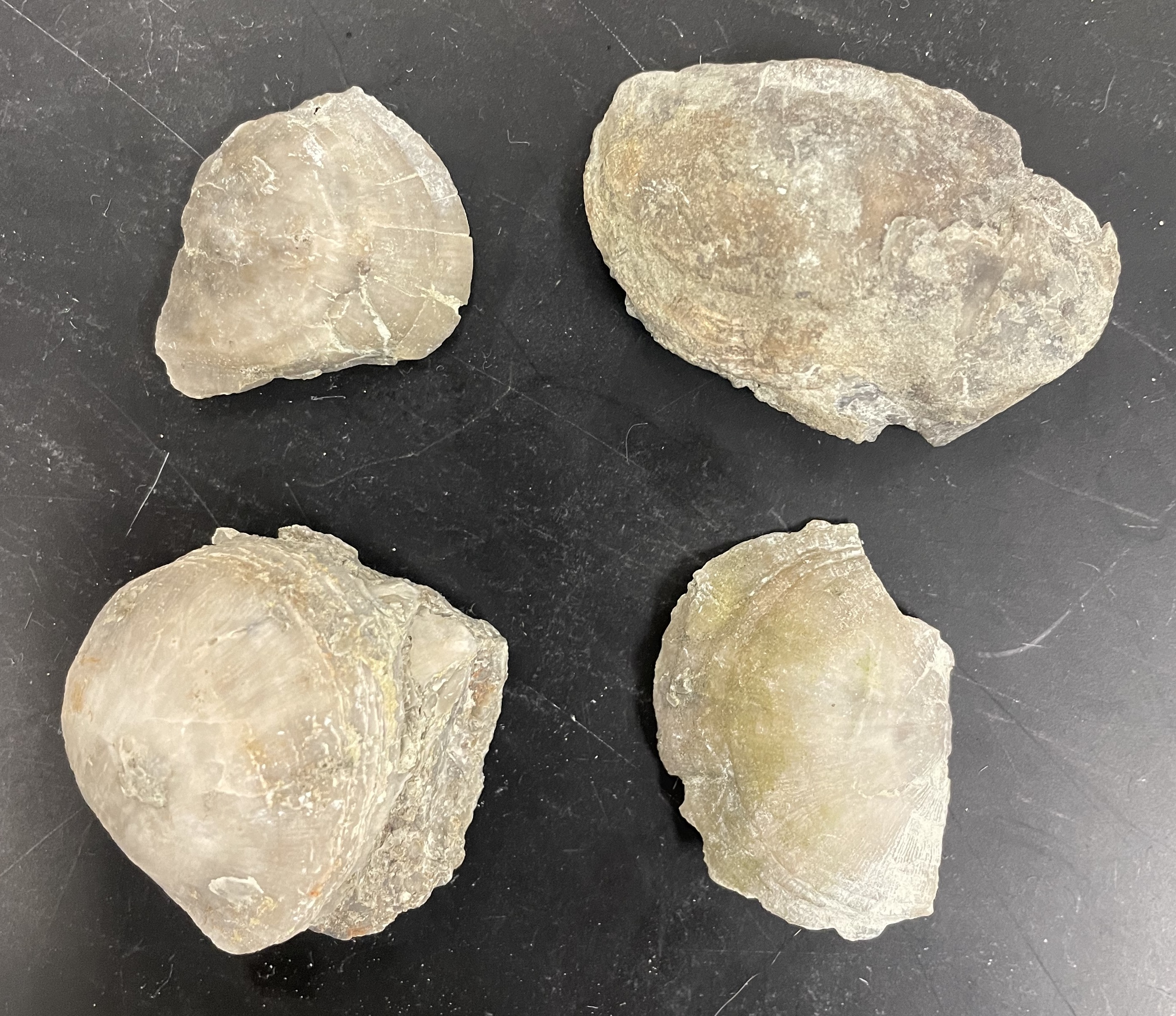
Fossilized brachiopods found in the Kope Formation. Various sizes and shapes are present. Specimens in image were collected in the middle of the formation.

The Kope Formation is the lowest layer at the Maysville roadcut. It is the oldest formation present from the late Ordovician period at Maysville and dates to approximately 460-450 million years ago. The formation has a blue-gray color that is mostly shale with some limestone.

The Kope Formation is the easiest to access at the Maysville roadcut and can be climbed readily with proper hiking equipment. Common fossils found in this formation include trilobites, which are often more abundant than at the Fairview and Bellevue formations. Trilobites are found in both rolled and prone positions. The Kope Formation mostly contains whole rolled Flexicalymene trilobites and fragments of Isotelus trilobites. An abundance of trilobites can be collected at the north end of the Kope Formation, closer to the top of the formation.

Brachiopods can be found in both small or broken fragments and whole specimens. Crinoid stems are abundant both as stacked fragments within a rock or individual discs lying within the sediment. Fossilized gastropods and bryozoans are abundant. Crinoid stems, gastropods, and bryozoans are found scattered throughout the Kope. Few loose cephalopods and many small cephalopods settled in large slabs of rock are also present. Cephalopods are most commonly found near the bottom of the formation. Many trace fossils are found within this layer, but the Fairview formation contains a greater amount of trace fossils. Many fossils are buried in large slabs of fossiliferous limestone and shale.

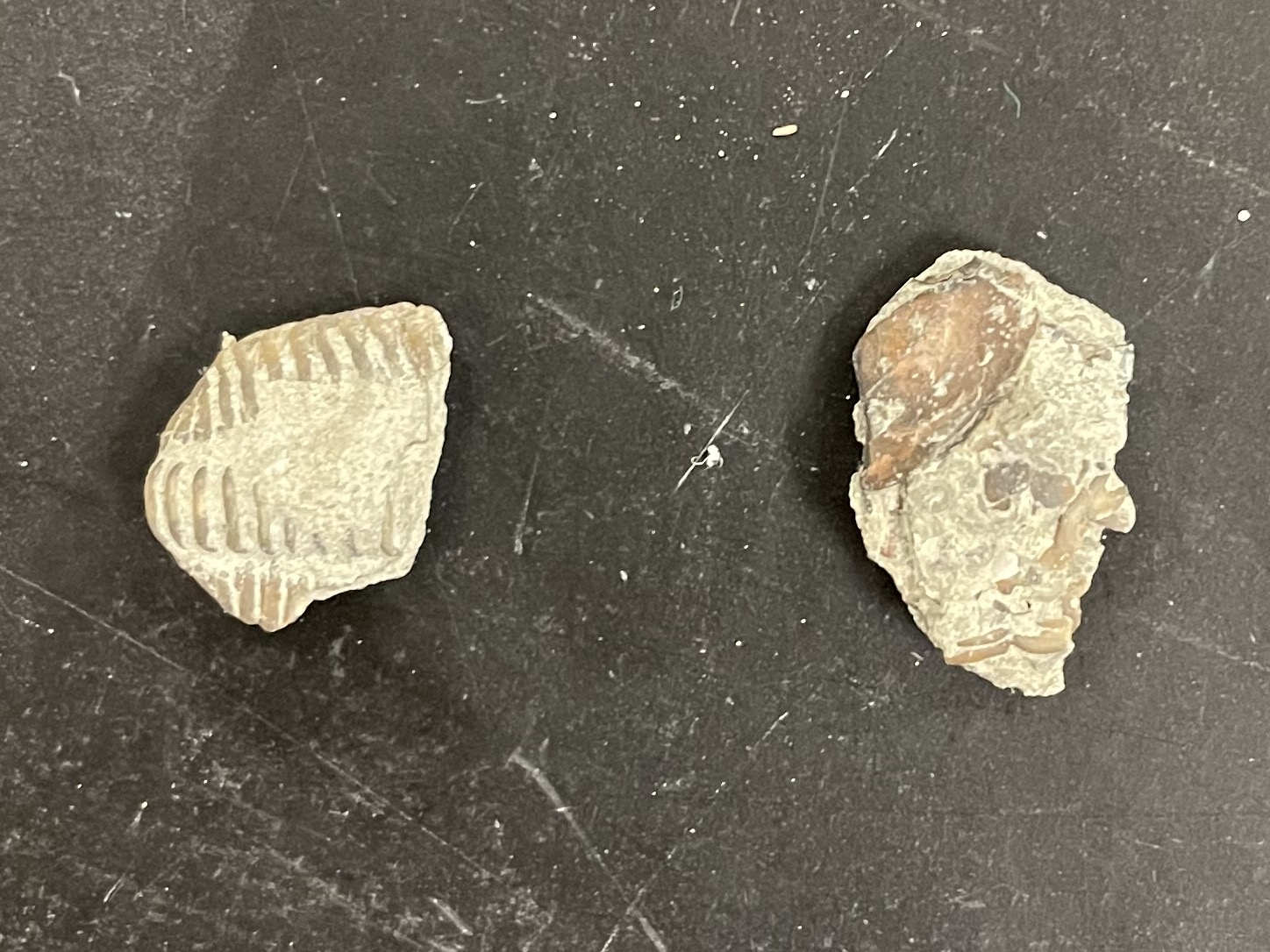
Fossilized trilobites found in the Kope Formation. A fragment of a prone Isotelus trilobite is pictured (left). Multiple fragments of possibly different trilobites are also pictured (right).

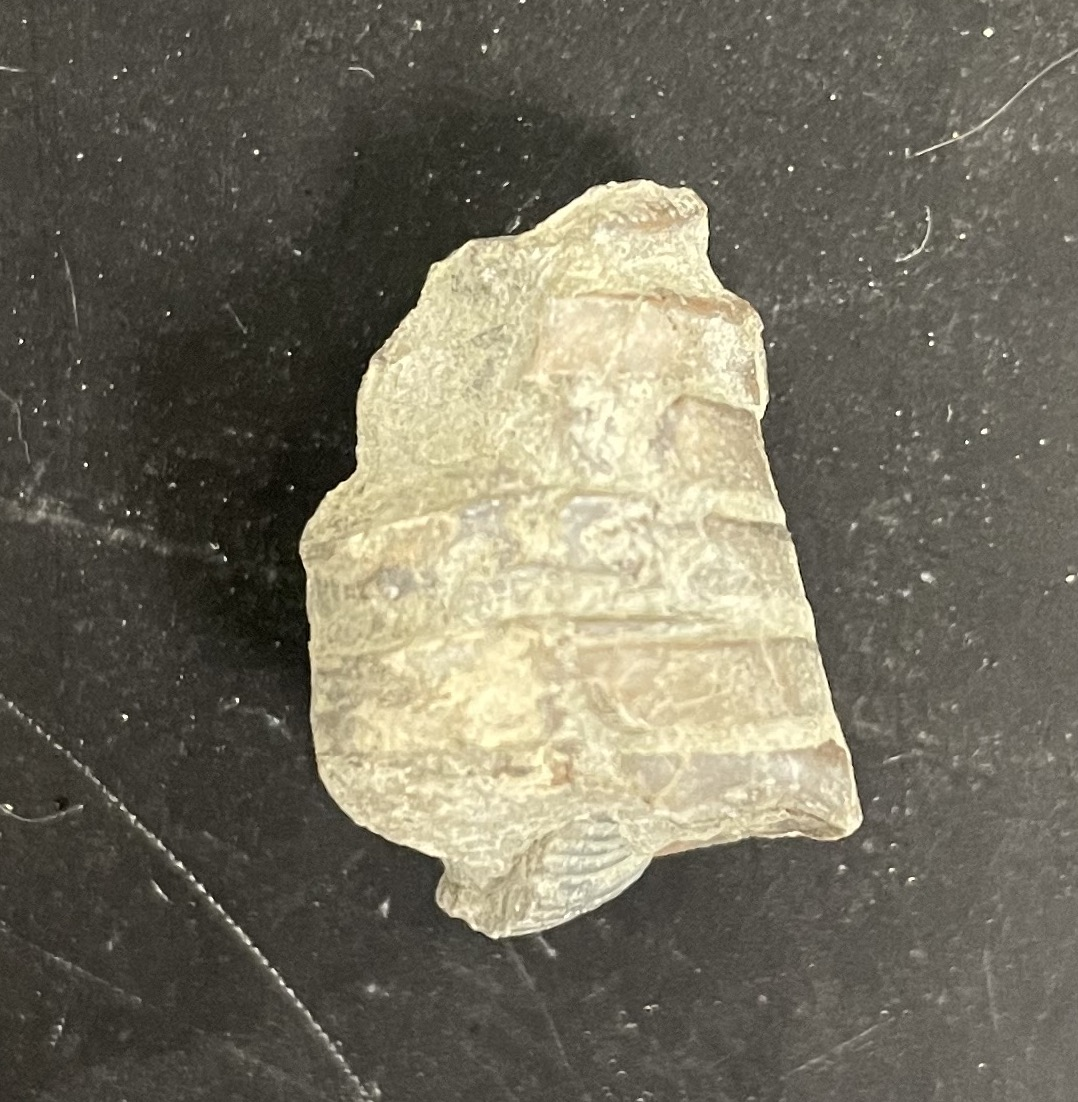
Fragment of a fossilized cephalopod collected near the bottom of the Kope Formation.

== Fairview Formation ==
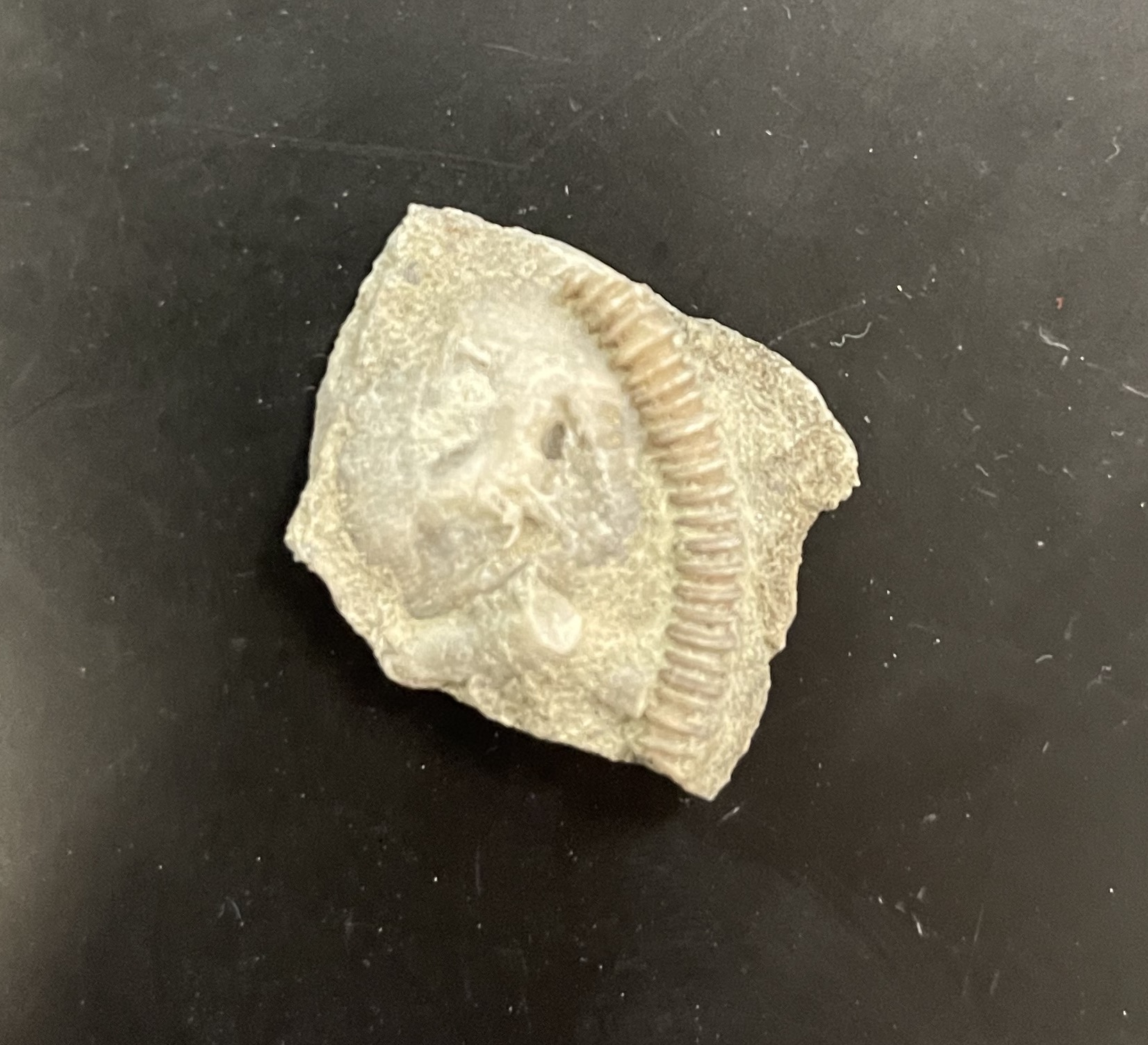
Part of a fossilized crinoid stem from the Fairview Formation.

The Fairview Formation is located in between the Kope and Bellevue formations, making it younger than Kope and older than Bellevue. The age of the Fairview Formation is about 455-450 million years ago. In order to access this formation, a trail is accessed on the south end of the roadcut. Visitors will find the majority of these fossils in the lower part of the Fairview formation as the upper part is difficult to access and potentially dangerous.

This formation comprises many different fossils mostly found in abundant large slabs of limestone. These different fossils include a large amount of brachiopods smaller in size than the brachiopods found in the Bellevue Formation as well as many brachiopod fragments. There is a large amount of small and broken crinoid stems.

The formation contains an abundance of rock slabs, some of which have large cephalopods in them. Cephalopods are very abundant and are larger in size than those found in the Kope Formation, because of the increase in food availability for these predators following the late Cambrian. Cephalopods survived well in this time period because they were able to prey on the many gastropods and mollusks that are also found in this formation.

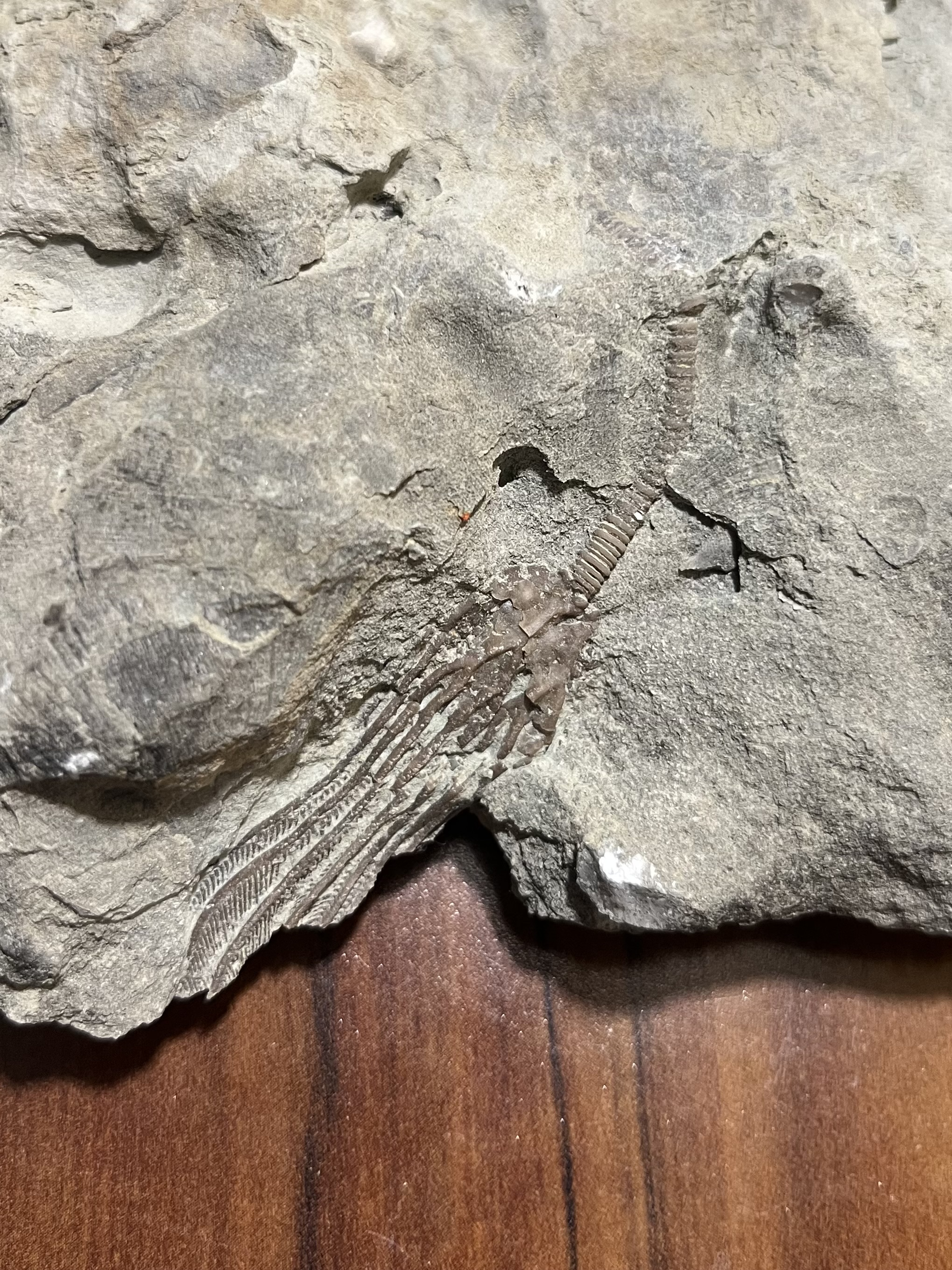
Fossilized crinoid stem from Fairview Formation. Image displays stem, arms, and pinnules.

== Bellevue Formation ==
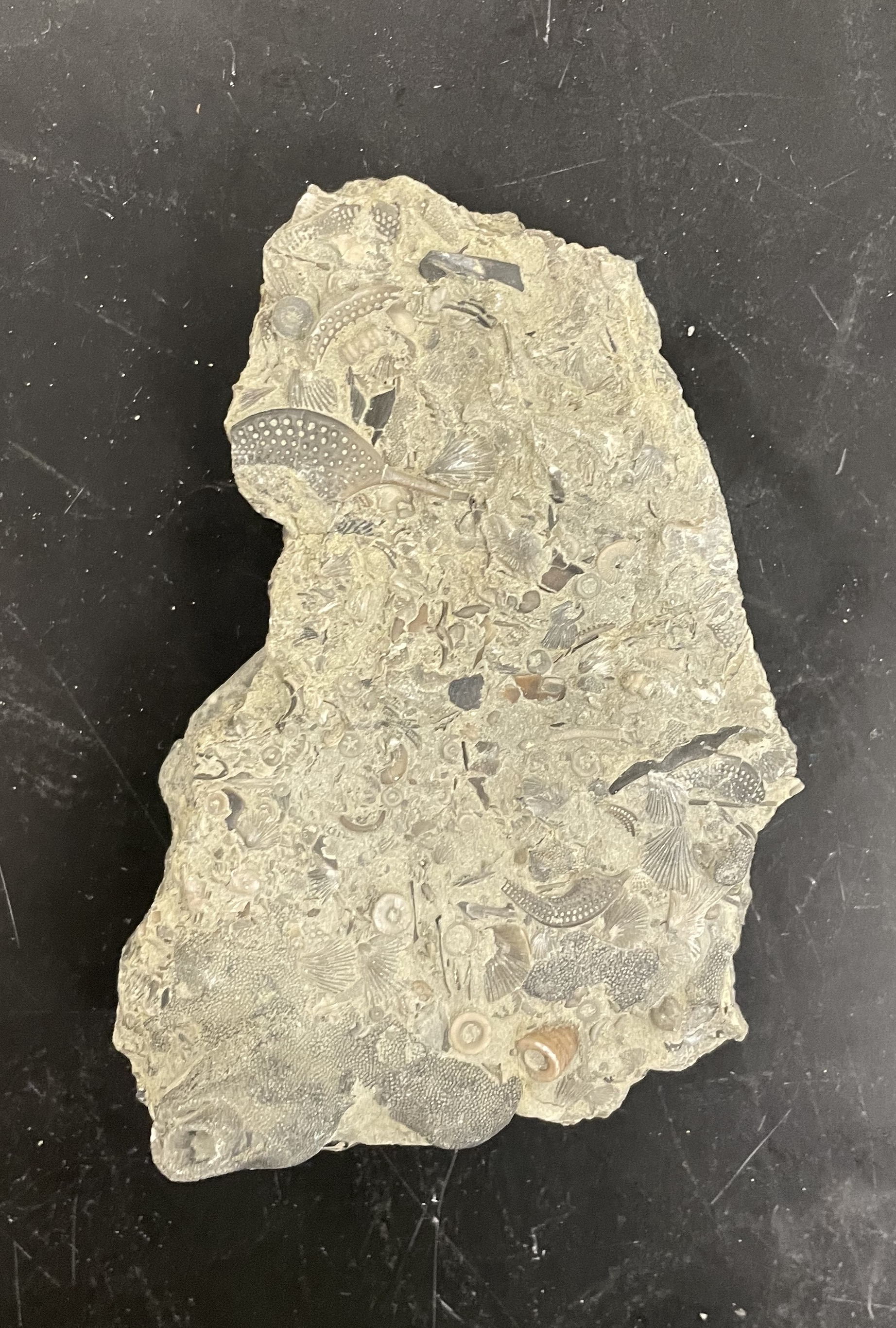
A slab of sea hash from the Bellevue formation. Within the sea hash many crinoid discs can be observed.

The Bellevue Formation is the uppermost rock bed layer and is the youngest layer of the Ordovician period, dating to around 455-450 million years ago. This formation is the least accessible of the three formations at Maysville, requiring a steep hike up a trail located near the south end of the roadcut. The top of Bellevue along with parts of the base are difficult to access and potentially dangerous.

Much of North America was underwater during the Ordovician period, therefore the Bellevue formation was formed from shallow water deposits consisting mostly of shale. Within the layers of shale, brachiopod fragments are prevalent, and commonly vinlandostrophia are found. There are many small crinoid stems because of the deposits that came from the shallow water in the most recent years of the Ordovician. The base of the formation contains a large collection of echinoderms. Crinoids are a part of the echinoderm phylum. There are larger fragments of bryozoa as well as vinlandostrophia in comparison to the Fairview and Kope formations, which can be found in the lower and base portions of the formation.

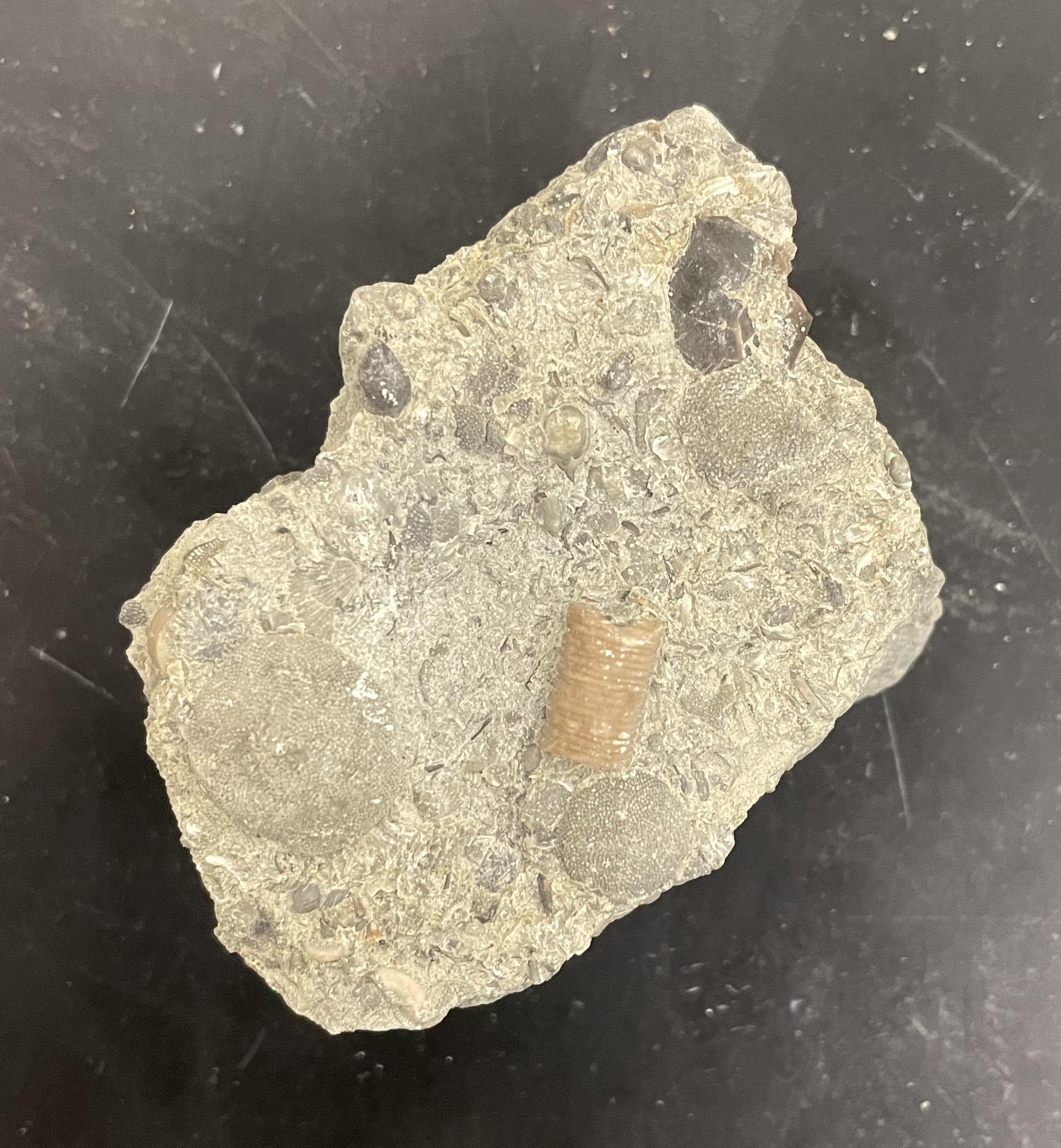
A large fragment of a crinoid stem, collected from the bottom of the Bellevue Formation.

== Fossil identification ==
Fossil collecting is prevalent in the Cincinnati Arch in Kentucky, Indiana, and Ohio. Roadcuts such as Maysville provide a unique opportunity for fossil hunters to view well preserved fossils in relatively open stratigraphy layers. Many of the fossils found are often loose and scattered among the rock, with some being found in larger chunks or slabs of rock. They can be found whole or fragmented.

The plethora of fossils in the area has drawn the attention of amateur and professional fossil hunters. This location in particular is home to the amateur fossil collecting and geologist association, the Dry Dredgers.
