= Telluric iron =

Iron found naturally on Earth that is neither in an ore nor from a meteorite

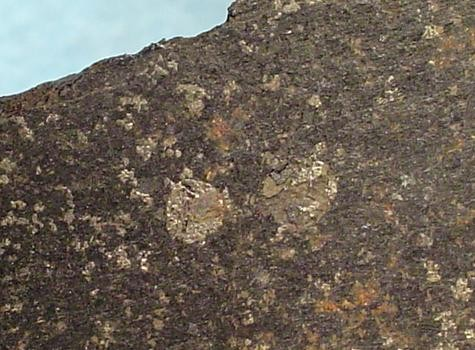
- Sawed slab of basalt with bright, metallic native-iron inclusions from Uivfaq, Disko Island (specimen size: 7.8 cm × 3.5 cm × 0.6 cm (3.07 in × 1.38 in × 0.24 in))

General
- Category: Native element mineral
- Formula: Fe
- Strunz classification: 1.AE.05
- Dana classification: 1.1.17.1
- Crystal system: Cubic
- Crystal class: Hexoctahedral (m3̅m); H-M symbol: (4/m 3̅ 2/m)
- Space group: Im3m
- Unit cell: a = 2.8664 Å; Z = 2

Identification
- Color: Steel-gray to iron-black, white in polished section
- Crystal habit: Massive, as interstitial blebs, rare as crystals
- Twinning: On {111} and on {112}
- Cleavage: {001}; with parting on {112}
- Fracture: Hackly
- Tenacity: Malleable
- Mohs scale hardness: 4
- Luster: Metallic
- Diaphaneity: Opaque
- Specific gravity: 7.3–7.87

Telluric iron, also called native iron, is iron that originated on Earth, and is found in a metallic form rather than as an ore. Telluric iron is extremely rare, with only one known major deposit in the world, located in Greenland.

== Introduction ==
With the exception of its molten core, nearly all elemental iron on Earth is found as iron ores. All metallic iron was thought to have been transformed into iron oxides during the Great Oxidation Event, beginning roughly 2 billion years ago, among other theories. Until the late 1800s, iron as a native metal was only a matter of speculation, outside of isolated Greenland. The only known terrestrial iron in metallic form was found as meteorites, which were deposited onto the Earth from outer space.

Telluric iron is so named after the Latin word Tellus, meaning "Earth" (the planet, as opposed to terra meaning "earth": the land, ground or soil), combined with the suffix -ic meaning "of" or "born from", differentiating it from meteorites. Telluric iron resembles meteoric iron, in that it contains both a significant amount of nickel and Widmanstatten structures. However, telluric iron typically contains only around 3% nickel, which is too low for meteorites, of which none have been found with less than 5%. There are two types of telluric iron: Both type 1 and type 2 contain comparable amounts of nickel and other impurities. The main difference between the two is the carbon content, which greatly affects the hardness, workability, and melting point of the metal.

== Material properties ==
Telluric iron is metallic iron that formed within the Earth's mantle and crust. Although minor deposits of telluric iron have been found around the world, the west shores of Greenland hold the only known major deposits. However, these deposits may vary drastically in shape and composition, even in the same region, as well as drastic variations between different regions such as Uivfaq, Asuk, Blaafjeld, and Mellemfjord. The common factor is that all Greenlandic deposits tend to be found in dikes (lava-filled fractures in the bedrock) or extrusions where molten rock was able to flow out onto the surface. Another commonality is that all deposits are found in association with graphite-rich feldspar, likely contributing to the high carbon-content and low oxide presence in the metal, although it is unknown if the metal managed to escape being oxidized with the rest of Earth's iron, or if it began as beds of ore and coal that subducted and then were naturally smelted in the lava due to the reducing environment provided by the carbon-rich, graphitic feldspar.

Telluric iron in Greenland is unique, in that it can be found in nearly all phases of iron-carbon alloys, and with drastically varying crystalline structures. In some rock it is found mixed with basalt as very small grains with sharp corners and irregular shapes, whereas in others the small, grain-sized droplets in the molten magma were able to coalesce into larger, pea-sized droplets that crystallized with a mostly spherical or oblong shape. Still in others the dike or extrusion may be made almost entirely out of very high-carbon cast-iron, which could more easily coalesce within the magma and flow into cracks due to its lower viscosity and melting point. This cast iron is often crusted with or contains inclusions of basalt, as it extruded out of the ground as very large, globular masses within the lava, out of which large boulders formed due to natural erosion of the surrounding basalt.

Telluric iron is largely divided into two groups, depending on the carbon content. Type 1 is a cast-iron typically containing over 2.0% carbon, while type 2 ranges somewhere between wrought iron and a eutectoid steel. Both types tend to handle weathering in the elements very well, but tend to decompose and crumble very quickly in the dry, controlled atmosphere of a museum, although type 2 is far more prone to this kind of damage.

=== Type 1 ===
Type 1 telluric iron contains a significant amount of carbon. Type 1 is a white nickel cast-iron, containing 1.7 to 4% carbon and 0.05 to 4% nickel, which is very hard and brittle and does not respond well to cold working. The structure of type 1 consists mainly of pearlite and cementite or cohenite, with inclusions of troilite and silicate. The individual ferrite grains are typically about a millimeter in size. Although the composition of the grains may vary, even within the same grain, they are mostly composed of fairly pure nickel-ferrite. The ferrite grains are connected with cementite laminations; typically 5–25 micrometers thick; forming the pearlite.

Type 1 is found as massive extrusions or very large boulders, typically ranging from a few tons to tens of tons. The metal could not be cold worked by the ancient Inuit (the local inhabitants of Greenland), and proves extremely difficult to machine even with modern tools. Machining of type 1 is possibly best accomplished with a carborundum wheel and water cooling. However type 1 was possibly used as hammer and anvil stones by the Inuit.

When sawed in half, boulders of type 1 tend to have a thick shell of cast-iron on the outside that can barely be broken with pneumatic jackhammers, but inside a much more brittle construction of iron grains in an almost powdery form, sintered together to form a porous, sponge-iron type of material that pulverizes at the strike of a hammer.

=== Type 2 ===
Type 2 telluric iron also contains around 0.05 to 4% nickel, but typically less than 0.7% carbon. Type 2 is a malleable nickel-iron which responds well to cold working. The carbon and nickel content have a great effect on the final hardness of the cold-worked piece.

Type 2 is found as small grains mixed within basalt rock. The grains are usually 1–5 millimeters in diameter. The grains are usually found individually, separated by the basalt, although they are sometimes sintered together to form larger aggregates. The larger pieces also contain small amounts of cohenite, ilmenite, pearlite, and troilite. Type 2 was used by the Inuit to make items such as knives and ulus. The basalt was usually crushed in order to release the pea-sized grains, which were then hammered into discs about the size of coins. The metal is very soft and can be hammered into very thin plates. These flat discs were usually inserted into long slits carved into bone handles, in rows so that they slightly overlapped each other, forming an edge that resembled a combination of a knife and a saw (an inverted scalloped edge).

== History ==
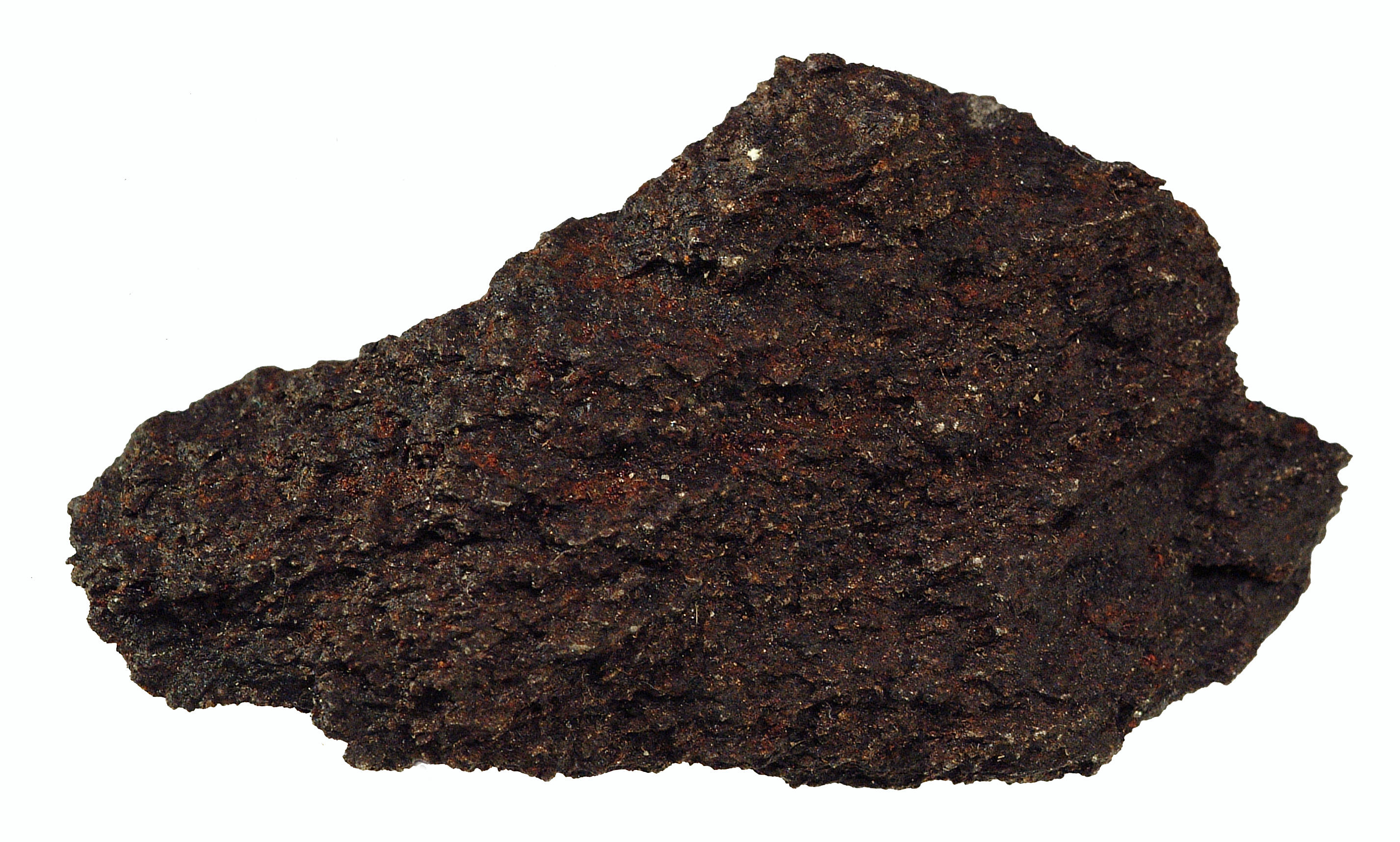
Hand-sized sample of native iron from Disko Island, Greenland

Aside from a very small deposit of telluric iron in Kassel, Germany, which has now been depleted, and a few other minor deposits from around the world, the only known major deposits exist in and nearby the area of Disko Bay, in Greenland. The material was found in the volcanic plains of basalt rock, and used by the local Inuit to make cutting edges for tools like knives and ulus. The Inuit were the only people to make practical use of telluric iron.

In 1870, Adolf Erik Nordenskiöld discovered large boulders of iron near the Disko Bay area of Greenland. Knowing that the Inuit had made tools from the Cape York meteorite, mainly due to Sir John Ross' discovery that the natives of Greenland used iron knives, Nordenskiöld landed at Fortune Bay on Disko Island to search for the material. The Inuit had told Ross that they got the iron from high on a mountain, at a site where two large boulders lay. One was very hard and could not be broken, but the other was chipped into smaller pieces from which balls of iron were extracted and hammered into flat discs for the knives. Nordenskiöld searched unsuccessfully for the site, until being led by some of the local Inuit to a place called Uivfaq, where large masses of metallic iron were strewn about the area. He assumed that the metal was of meteoric origin, since both contain significant amounts of nickel and both had Widmanstätten patterns. Most scientists at the time believed that no un-oxidized telluric iron existed, and few questioned Nordenskiöld's finding.

Gustav Nauckhoff made an expedition to Greenland in 1871. Armed with dynamite and lifting equipment, his expedition collected three large samples of telluric iron, also believing them to be meteoric, per Nordenskiöld's examination, and brought them back to Europe for further study. These samples can be found currently in Sweden, Finland, and Denmark. A 25-ton block now rests outside of the Riksmuseum in Stockholm, a 6.6 ton block outside the Geological Museum in Copenhagen, and a 3-ton block can be found in the Museum of Natural History in Kumpula, Helsinki.

Accompanying Nauckhoff in 1871 was K. J. V. Steenstrup. Due to circumstances like the shape of the boulders, which often had sharp corners or jagged edges that are not characteristic of meteorites (which ablate considerably during atmospheric entry), or the fact that many had areas that were encrusted with basalt, Steenstrup disagreed with Nordenskiöld about the origin of the boulders, and set out on an expedition of his own in 1878. In 1879, Steenstrup first identified the type 2 iron, showing that it also contained Widmanstätten structures. Steenstrup later reported what he found:

In the autumn of 1879, I made a discovery in connection with this matter, for in an old grave at Ekaluit ... I found 9 pieces of basalt containing round balls and irregular pieces of metallic iron. These pieces were lying together with bone knives, similar to those brought home by Ross, as well as with the usual stone tools ... whereas the 9 pieces of basalt with the iron balls were evidently the material for the bone knives. This iron is soft and keeps well in the air, from which reason it is fit for use in the manner described by Ross. The rock in which the iron appears is a typical, large-grained felspar-basalt. The discovery has a double significance, firstly, because it is the first time we have seen the material out of which the Esquimaux made artificial knives, and secondly, because it showed that they have used telluric iron for that purpose.

After the discovery in the grave at Ekaluit, Steenstrup found many large outcrops of basalt containing the type 2 iron. Since the type 2 grains are embedded within volcanic basalt that matches the underlying bedrock, Steenstrup was able to show that the iron was from terrestrial, or telluric, sources. In his report, Steenstrup added,

This peculiar layer of basalt is filled from top to bottom with iron-grains of all sizes from a fraction of a millimeter to a length of 18 mm with a breadth of 14 mm, which is the greatest I have found. ... When polished, this iron shows beautiful Widmannstätten figures. ... Metallic nickel-iron with Widmannstätten figures has now been proved to be also a telluric mineral, and the presence of nickel together with a certain crystalline structure are consequently not sufficient to give the character of meteorites to loose iron blocks.

Steenstrup's findings were later confirmed by meteorite expert J. Lawrence Smith in 1879, and then by Joh Lorenzen in 1882. The extremely rare telluric iron found in western Greenland has been under study ever since.

== Occurrence ==
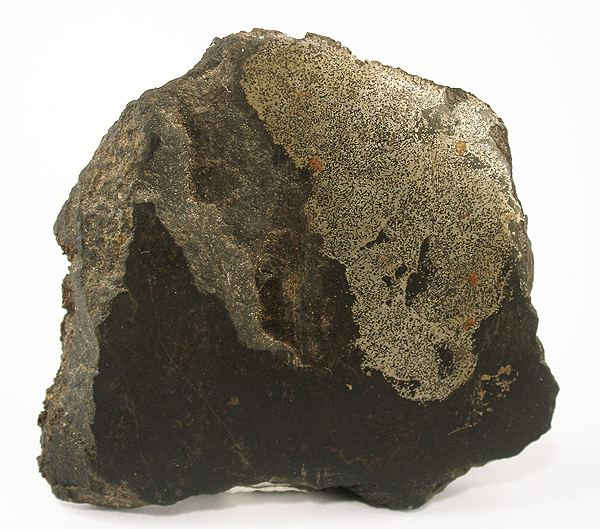
Native iron from basalt quarry at Bühl, Weimar, district of Kassel, Germany (size: 6.6 × 5.9 × 1.8 cm)

In addition to the Disko Island deposit native iron has been reported from Fortune Bay, Mellemfjord, Asuk, and other locations along Greenland's west coast. Other locations include:

- Ben Breck, Scotland in granite with magnetite
- in County Antrim, Northern Ireland
- occurs in basalt at Bühl, near Ahnatal-Weimar, Hesse, and associated with nodules of pyrite within limestone at Muhlhausen, Thuringia, Germany
- near Rivne, Volhynia, Ukraine
- in trachyte at Auvergne, France
- in Russia at Grushersk in the Don district southern Urals associated with pyrite; in the Huntukungskii (Khungtukun) massif, Krasnoyarsk Kray; and on the Tolbachik fissure volcano on the Kamchatka Peninsula
- in the Hatrurim Formation, Negev, Israel
- In the United States occurrences have been reported from coal beds near Cameron, Clinton County, Missouri; and from carboniferous shale near New Brunswick, Somerset County, New Jersey
- In Ontario it has been reported from Cameron Township, Nipissing District, and on St. Joseph Island in Lake Huron.

Native nickel-iron alloys with Ni_{3}Fe to Ni_{2}Fe occur as placer deposits derived from ultramafic rocks. Awaruite was described in 1885 from New Zealand.
