= Chinga meteorite =

Meteorite found in Russia

Chinga
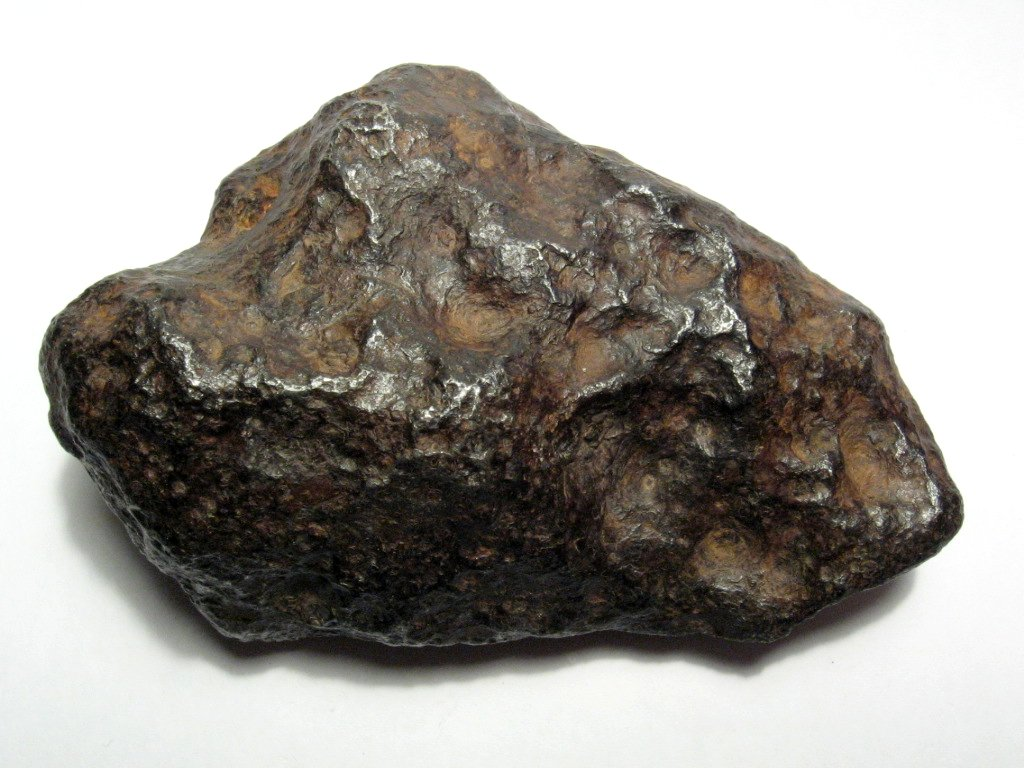
- Type: Iron
- Structural classification: Ataxite
- Group: IVB-an, (2000), Iron-ung (2006)
- Composition: Meteoric iron: 16.7% Ni, very rare kamacite lamella. Inclusions: daubréelite.
- Region: Russia
- Coordinates: 51°3′30″N 94°24′0″E
- Observed fall: No
- Found date: 1913
- TKW: 209.4 kilograms (462 lb)
- Related media on Wikimedia Commons

The Chinga meteorite is an iron meteorite. It is structurally an ataxite with very rare kamacite lamella. The meteoric iron is a part of the lamella taenite. The total chemical composition is 82.8% iron, 16.6% nickel, and the rest mostly cobalt and phosphorus.

== History ==
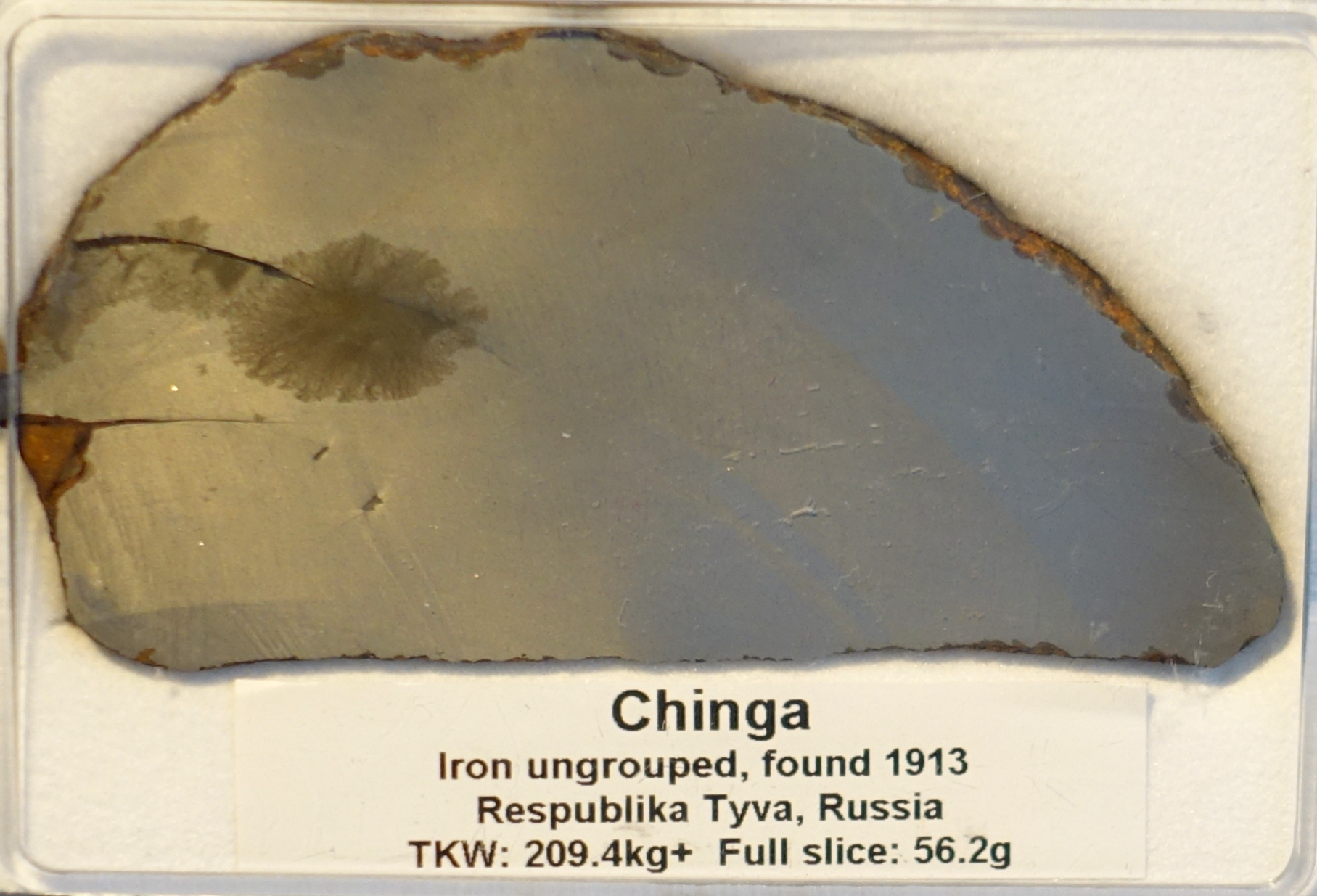
Piece of Chinga meteorite exhibited in Nuremberg, Germany.

Fragments of the meteorite were found in 1913 by gold diggers in Tuva near the Chinge River after which it is named. Eventually, Nikolay Chernevich, a mining engineer supervising the gold diggers, sent thirty pieces, the heaviest of which was 20.5 kilograms (45 lb), to the Russian Academy of Sciences in Saint Petersburg. Later expeditions have retrieved about 250 pieces with a total mass of 209.4 kilograms (462 lb).

No impact structure was found. Studies from the fluvial deposits in which the meteorites was found estimate that it fell about 10,000 to 20,000 years ago. It burst during passage through the atmosphere, the pieces impacting on a glacier.

As of December 2012 pieces of the Chinga meteorite were on sale for US$1 to 2/g.

== Classification ==
The Chinga meteorite was classified as an IVB meteorite (Subgroup "an") in 2000, but was reclassified as an Iron ungrouped (Iron-ung) in 2006.

== In culture ==
The Iron Man is a statue that was possibly made from a fragment of the Chinga meteorite.

Researchers say the 1,000-year-old object with a swastika on its stomach is made from a rare form of iron with a high content of nickel.

== See also ==
- Glossary of meteoritics
