= Chinge =

- Native name: Чинге (Russian)

Location
- Country: Russia
- Federal subject: Tuva

Physical characteristics
- Mouth: Mezhegey

Basin features
- Progression: Mezhegey→ Elegest→ Yenisey→ Kara Sea

The Chinge (Russian: Чинге) is a river in the Tandinsky District of Tuva, Russia. It is a left tributary of the Mezhegey which belongs to the drainage basin of the Yenisey.

The source of the Chinge is on the northern slope of the Eastern Tannu-Ola Range, close to the border with Mongolia. The river flows north. The only settlement on the Chinge is Urgaylyg (Argolik).

The Chinga meteorite was found on the shore of the Chinge and named after it (51°3′30″N 94°24′0″E).
