= Iron Man (Buddhist statue) =

Sculpture, alleged to be Tibetan, possibly depicting the Buddhist deity Vaiśravaṇa

- Year: c. 1,000 CE
- Type: Sculpture
- Medium: Ataxite class nickel-rich iron meteorite
- Subject: initially speculated the Buddhist deity Vaiśravaṇa, after research Nicholas Roerich
- Dimensions: 24 cm (9.4 in); Weight 10 kilograms (22 lb)
- Location: private collection in Vienna

The Iron Man statue is a 24 centimetres (9.4 in), 10 kilograms (22 lb) sculpture. The figure is adorned with a counterclockwise-rotation Buddhist swastika.

Sensational newspaper articles presented it in fresh and cheerful headlines under the "Science" section as a Buddha with extraterrestrial origin and a Nazi history. Relationships with extraterrestrials have been a key issue for Nazi occultists and Tibetan esotericists. Albeit claims that the statue may have been acquired by the SS expedition to Tibet 1938–1939, evidence of the statue's provenance was never presented. The statue was kept in a private collection in Germany until it was auctioned in 2007 into hands in Vienna, inaccessible to further study.

The material has been dated to the time of the Chinga meteorite, which fell near eastern Siberia and Mongolia between 10,000 and 20,000 years ago. Elmar Buchner, the researcher who had determined the statue's composition has said, "If we are right that it was made in the Bon culture in the eleventh century, it is absolutely priceless and absolutely unique worldwide." But even the authors of the meteorite theory expressed several concerns and remarked that their assessment of it being carved in the eleventh century is mere speculation.

The Buddhologist from Dongguk University, Achim Bayer, published the widely acclaimed article The Lama Wearing Trousers examining twelve stylistic characteristics which, in his view, indicated the statue was extremely unlikely to have originated in Tibet. He estimated the date of the statue at somewhere between 1920 and 1970. In addition, he proposed "that the statue was produced in Germany either for the general antique and curio market, or even for the lucrative market of Nazi memorabilia."

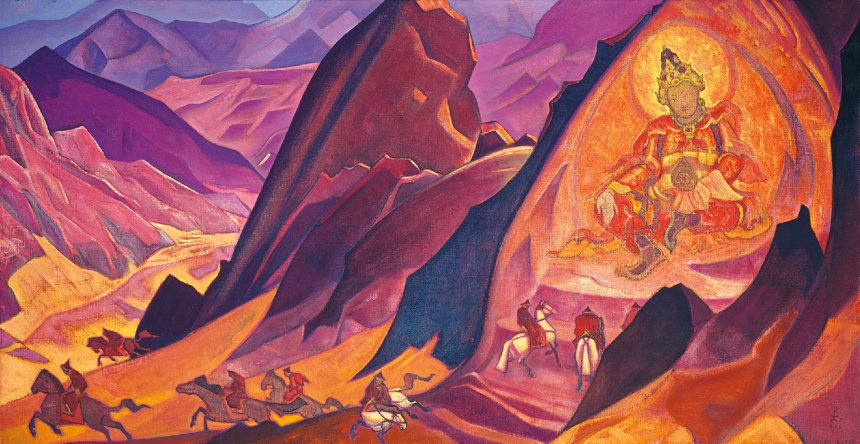
The Order of Rigden Jyepo, painting by Nicholas Roerich (1924).

The German historian and Tibetologist Isrun Engelhardt (1941–2022) from the University of Bonn tracked down the origin of the sculpture and largely deciphered its secret. She published her academic essay The Strange Case of the "Buddha from Space" in 2017 in the specialist magazine "The Revue d'Études Tibétaines". Isrun convincingly argued that the statue had most probably been designed and made for the eccentric Russian orientalist and painter Nicholas Roerich (1874–1947). Roerichs painting "The Order of Rigden Jyepo", which depicts the mythological Shambhala King, who, according to prophecies, will engulf the world in an apocalyptic war may have served as a template for the sculpture. Roerich claimed to be the incarnation of Rigden Jyepo. Roerich even described himself as the ″coming king of Shambhala″ in a letter to the Dalai Lama. In Darjeeling he had magnificent, traditional robes made for him, which he occasionally wore. Roerich planned to enter Tibet as Rigden Jyepo, the 25th King of Shambhala. Engelhardt concluded: "One can assume from these arguments that the meteorite statue portrays Nicholas Roerich as Rigden Jyepo or Reta Rigden, and thus the main mystery appears to have been solved."

The German meteorologist Elmar Buchner, who examined the statue in 2008, told the southern German newspaper Waiblinger Kreiszeitung, he neither is willing to confirm nor to deny the way of the statue into his hands, which Isrun Engelhardt described in her above cited publication. Engelhardt asserted that the owner was a Russian called Igor Kaledin, who in 2007 came in contact with Buchner via a Russian friend and interpreter in Stuttgart. Kaledin stated, he lives in Australia, Engelhardt wrote, and wanted to let Buchner examine and analyze the material of the statue. Buchner commentated in the Waiblinger Kreiszeitung: "The owner of the statue wanted to stay anonymous, but told me that he purchased the statue at an auction." Buchner further said: "The man who pre-owned the statue before that person is said to having inherited the statue from his father and that it once had been brought to Munich as part of the artefact pool of the SS expedition to Tibet 1938–1939." In the end, in 2009, the Russian owner sold the statue to Gero Kurat, at that time geologist at the "Naturhistorisches Museum" in Vienna. Kurat passed away in the same year, but the Museum confirmed to the Waiblinger Kreiszeitung, that the statue should still be in the private property of the Kurat's family in Vienna. Buchner said, "lastly it had been offered to me for a seven digit amount of money, which I refused to be too expensive."

== See also ==
- Glossary of meteoritics
- Thokcha, the Tibetan use of meteorite metal in ritual objects
