= Antitaenite =

Metal alloy

General
- Category: Minerals
- Formula: Fe_{3}Ni
- IMA status: Rejected
- Strunz classification: 1.AE.10
- Crystal system: Isometric

Identification
- Color: Gray
- Cleavage: None
- Fracture: Malleable
- Luster: Metallic
- Streak: Gray

Antitaenite is a meteoritic metal alloy mineral composed of iron (Fe) and 20–40% nickel (Ni), (and traces of other elements) that has a face centered cubic crystal structure.

There are three other known Fe-Ni meteoritic minerals: kamacite, taenite, and tetrataenite.

The existence of antitaenite as a new mineral species, occurring in both iron meteorites and in chondrites, was first proposed in 1995 but the IMA has not approved paramagnetic antitaenite; instead the organization regards it as a variety of taenite. Gamma (fcc) Fe-Ni alloys with low-Ni (about 25% Ni) are probably inhomogeneous on a nanometer scale.

Antitaenite and taenite have the same crystal structure (face centered cubic) and can have the same chemical composition (same proportions of Fe and Ni) but they differ in their electronic structures: taenite has a high magnetic moment whereas antitaenite has a low magnetic moment. This difference in electronic structure was first established in 1999 and arises from a high-magnetic-moment to low-magnetic-moment transition occurring in the Fe-Ni bi-metallic alloy series. The same electronic structure transition is believed to be a causal factor in Invar behaviour.

== See also ==
- Glossary of meteoritics
