= Iron–nickel clusters =

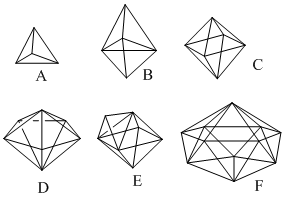
Figure 1: Closed triangulated polyhedra. (a) Tetrahedron (T_{d}), (b) Trigonal bipyramid (D_{3h}). (c) Octahedron (O_{h}). (d) Pentagonal bipyramid (D_{5d}). (e) Capped octahedron (C_{s}). (f) Octadecahedron (C_{2r})

Iron–nickel (Fe–Ni) clusters are metal clusters consisting of iron and nickel, i.e. Fe–Ni structures displaying polyhedral frameworks held together by two or more metal–metal bonds per metal atom, where the metal atoms are located at the vertices of closed, triangulated polyhedra.

Individually, iron (Fe) and nickel (Ni) generally form metal clusters with π-acceptor ligands. Π acceptor ligands are ligands that remove some of the electron density from the metal.

Figure 1 contains pictures of representative cluster shapes. Clusters take the form of closed, triangulated polyhedral.

Corresponding bulk systems of Fe and Ni atoms show a variety of composition-dependent abnormalities and unusual effects. Fe–Ni composites are studied in hopes to understand and utilize these unusual and new properties.

Fe–Ni clusters are used for several main purposes. Fe–Ni clusters ranging from single to hundreds of atoms are used in catalysis, depending on the reaction mechanism. Additionally, Fe–Ni clusters, usually of one or two metal atoms, are used in biological systems. These applications are discussed below.

== General properties ==
=== Structure and geometry ===
Several general trends are recognized in determining the structure of Fe–Ni clusters. Larger clusters, containing both iron and nickel, are most stable with Fe atoms located in the inner parts of the cluster and Ni metals on outside. In other terms, when iron and nickel form body-centered cubic structures the preferred position of Ni atoms is at the surface, instead of at the center of the cluster, as it is energetically unfavorable for two nickel atoms to occupy nearest-neighbor positions.

Metal–metal bonds, being d-orbital interactions, happen at larger distances. More stable metal–metal bonds are expected to be longer than unstable bonds. This is shown by the fact that the Fe–Ni bond length is in between Ni–Ni and Fe–Fe bond lengths. For example, in Fe–Ni four-atom clusters (FeNi)_{2} which are most stable in a tetrahedral structure, the bond length of metal–metal Fe–Ni bond is 2.65Å and Fe–Fe bond is 2.85 Å. When bonding in these structures is examined, it follows that lowest energy cluster structures of iron and nickel are given by geometries with a maximum number of Fe–Fe bonds, and a small number of Ni–Ni bonds.

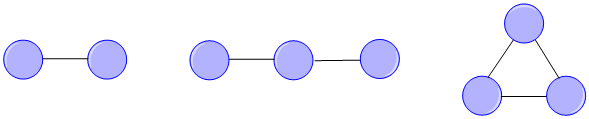
Figure 2: Small-molecule arrangements

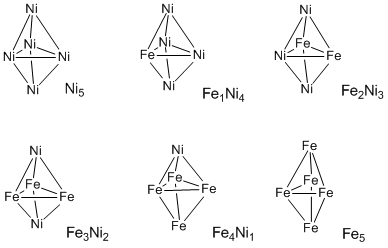
Figure 3: Geometry of Fe–Ni five-atom clusters

The simplest Fe–Ni clusters are of one iron atom and one nickel atom bonded together. More complex clusters can be added through the addition of another atom. Some pictures of sample geometries are shown in Fig. 2.

All Fe–Ni clusters exhibit some degree of distortion from usual geometry. This distortion generally becomes more pronounced as the number of Fe atoms increases.

Notice how in the above cluster diagrams, as calculated by Rollmann and colleagues, the symmetry of the cluster changes from a pure octahedron (D_{3h}) to a square pyramid (C_{4v}) as more iron atoms are added.

=== Reactivity and stability ===
As mentioned previously, the relative bonding between Ni atoms in (FeNi)_{n} clusters is weak and the stability of these clusters could be enhanced by increasing the number of Fe–Fe and Fe–Ni bonds. One measure of stability in Fe–Ni clusters is the binding energy, or how much energy is required to break the bonds between two atoms. The larger the binding energy, the stronger the bond. Binding energies of Fe_{n-x}Ni_{x} clusters are found to generally decrease by successive substitutions of Ni atoms for Fe atoms.

The average magnetic moment (μ_{av}) increases in a Fe–Ni cluster through the replacement of more and more Fe atoms. This is due to fact that magnetic moments of Fe atom/ Fe bulk are more than that of Ni atom/ Ni bulk values. The local magnetic moment of Ni (μ_{atom,local}) decreases by a proportional increase of Fe atoms. This is due to charge transfer from nickel's 4s orbital and iron atoms to nickel's 3d orbitals.

Below is a table of the bond length (R_{e}, in Å), binding energy (E_{b}, in eV), and magnetic moment (M, in μ_{a}) of the small clusters Fe_{2}, Ni_{2}, and FeNi from two authors. Notice how both authors show that Fe_{2} has the smallest bond length, the lowest binding energy, and the largest magnetic moment of the cluster combinations.

	R_{e}			E_{b}			M		
Author	Fe_{2}	Ni_{2}	FeNi	Fe_{2}	Ni_{2}	FeNi	Fe_{2}	Ni_{2}	FeNi
Nakazawa	2.15	2.38	2.34	0.64	0.80	2.04	9	3	5
Rao	2.02	2.14	2.08	1.70	2.83	2.33	6	2	4

Below is another table of bond length (R_{e}), binding energy (E_{b}), and magnetic moment (M) of Fe–Ni clusters containing five atoms.

		R_{e}				
Cluster	Symmetry	Fe–Fe	Fe–Ni	Ni–Ni	E_{b}	M_{total}
Ni_{5}	D_{3h}	-	-	X	2.40	4.00
	C_{4v}	-	-	2.43	1.34	7.00
	D_{3h}	-	-	2.03, 2.47	1.37	5
Fe_{1}Ni_{4}	-	-	-	-	2.48	8.0
	C_{4v}	-	2.49	2.43	1.5	11.0
Fe_{2}Ni_{3}	D_{3h}	-	-	-	2.54	11.98
	C_{2v}	3.56	2.49	2.46	1.54	13
	C_{s}	2.46	2.49,2.51	2.31,2.43	1.46	11
Fe_{3}Ni_{2}	-	-	-	-	2.59	12.0
	C_{2v}	2.90	2.38,2.59	-	1.58	15.00
	C_{s}	2.48,2.54	2.46,2.61	2.56	1.58	9.00
Fe_{4}Ni_{1}	C_{4v}	-	-	-	2.57	16.00
	C_{4v}	2.64	2.34	-	1.69	15.00
Fe_{5}	C_{4v}	-	-	-	2.48	16.03
	C_{4v}	2.52,2.56	-	-	1.72	19.00

== Magnetic properties ==
The magnetic properties of metal clusters are strongly influenced by their size and surface ligands. In general, the magnetic moments in small metal clusters are larger than in the case of a macroscopic bulk metal structure. For example, the average magnetic moment per atom in Ni clusters was found to be 0.7-0.8 μB, as compared with 0.6 μB for bulk Ni. This is explained by longer metal–metal bonds in cluster structures than in bulk structures, a consequence of a larger s character of metal–metal bonds in clusters. Magnetic moments approach bulk values as cluster size increases, though this is often difficult to predict computationally.

Magnetic quenching is an important phenomenon that is well documented for Ni clusters, and represents a significant effect of ligands on metal cluster magnetism. It has been shown that CO ligands cause the magnetic moments of surface Ni atoms to go to zero and the magnetic moment of inner Ni atoms to decrease to 0.5 μB. In this case, the 4s-derived Ni–Ni bonding molecular orbitals experience repulsion with the Ni-CO σ orbital, which causes its energy level to increase so that 3d-derived molecular orbitals are filled instead. Furthermore, Ni-CO π backbonding leaves Ni slightly positive, causing more transfer of electrons to 3d-derived orbitals, which are less disperse than those of 4s. Together, these effects result in a 3d^{10}, diamagnetic character of the ligated Ni atoms, and their magnetic moment decreases to zero.

Density functional theory (DFT) calculations have shown that these ligand-induced electronic effects are limited to only surface Ni atoms, and inner cluster atoms are virtually unperturbed. Experimental findings have described two electronically distinct cluster atoms, inner atoms and surface atoms. These results indicate the significant effect that a cluster's size has on its properties, magnetic and other.

== Fe–Ni clusters in biology ==
Fe–Ni metal clusters are crucial for energy production in many bacteria. A primary source of energy in bacteria is the oxidation and reduction of H_{2} which is performed by hydrogenase enzymes.

These enzymes are able to create a charge gradient across the cell membrane which serves as an energy store. In aerobic environments, the oxidation and reduction of oxygen is the primary energy source. However, many bacteria are capable of living in environments where O_{2} supply is limited and use H_{2} as their primary energy source . The hydrogense enzymes which provide energy to the bacteria are centered around either a Fe–Fe or Fe–Ni active site. H_{2} metabolism is not used by humans or other complex life forms, but proteins in the mitochondria of mammalian life appear to have evolved from hydrogenase enzymes, indicating that hydrogenase is a crucial step in the evolutionary development of metabolism.

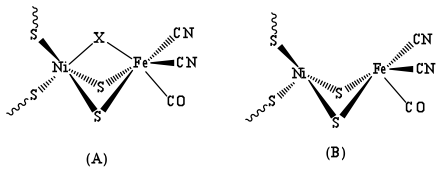
Figure 2:Active site of the Fe–Ni active site in (A) the inactive oxidized and (B) the active reduced form.

The active site of Fe–Ni containing hydrogenase enzymes often is composed of one or more bridging sulfur ligands, carbonyl, cyanide and terminal sulfur ligands. The non-bridging sulfur ligands are often cystine amino acid residues that attach the active site to the protein backbone. Metal–metal bonds between the Fe and Ni have not been observed. Several oxidation states of the Fe–Ni core have been observed in a variety of enzymes, though not all appear to be catalytically relevant.

The extreme oxygen and carbon monoxide sensitivity of these enzymes presents a challenge when studying the enzymes, but many crystallographic studies have been performed. Crystal structures for enzymes isolated from D. gigas, Desulfovibrio vulgaris, Desulfovibrio fructosovorans, Desulfovibrio desulfuricans, and Desulfomicrobium baculatum have been obtained, among others. A few bacteria, such as R. eutropha, have adapted to survive under ambient oxygen levels.

These enzymes have inspired study of structural and functional model complexes in hopes of making synthetic catalysis for hydrogen production (see Fe–Ni and hydrogen production, below, for more detail).

== Fe–Ni and hydrogen production ==
In the search for a clean, renewable energy source to replace fossil fuels, hydrogen has gained much attention as a possible fuel for the future. One of the challenges that must be overcome if this is to become a reality is an efficient way to produce and consume hydrogen. Currently, we have the technology to generate hydrogen from coal, natural gas, biomass and water. The majority of hydrogen currently produced comes from natural gas reformation, and hence does not help remove fossil fuel as an energy source. A variety of sustainable methods for hydrogen production are currently being researched, including solar, geothermal and catalytic hydrogen production.

Platinum is currently used to catalyze hydrogen production, but as Pt is expensive, found in limited supply, and easily poisoned by carbon monoxide during H_{2} production, it is not a practical for large-scale use. Catalysts inspired by the Fe–Ni active site of many hydrogen producing enzymes are particularly desirable due to the readily available and inexpensive metals.

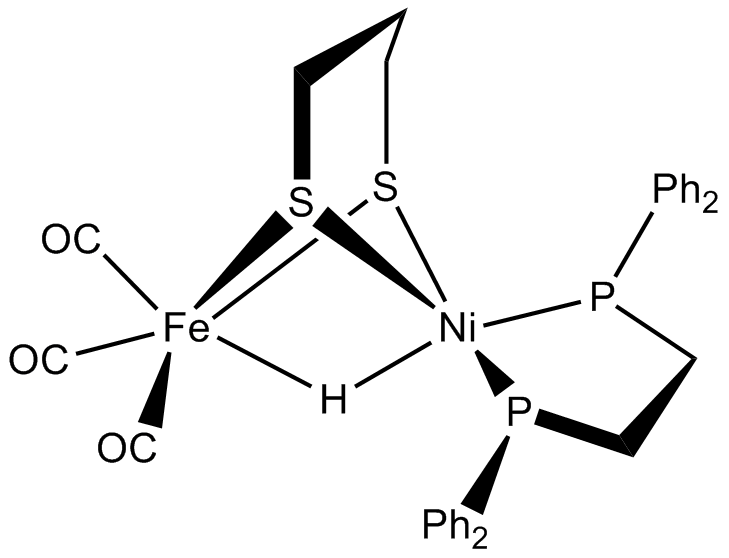
Figure 3:Only reported complex that shows catalytic reduction of H to H_{2}

The synthesis of Fe–Ni biomimetic catalytic complexes has proved difficult, primarily due to the extreme oxygen-sensitivity of such complexes. To date, only one example of a Fe–Ni model complex that is stable enough to withstand the range of electronic potential required for catalysis has been published.

When designing model complexes, it is crucial to preserve the key features of the active site of the Fe–Ni hydrogenases: the iron organometallic moiety with CO or CN^{−} ligands, nickel coordinated to terminal sulfur ligands, and the thiolate bridge between the metals. By preserving these traits of the enzyme active site, it is hoped that the synthetic complexes will operate at the electrochemical potential necessary for catalysis, have a high turnover frequency and be robust.
