= Awaruite =

Naturally occurring alloy of nickel and iron

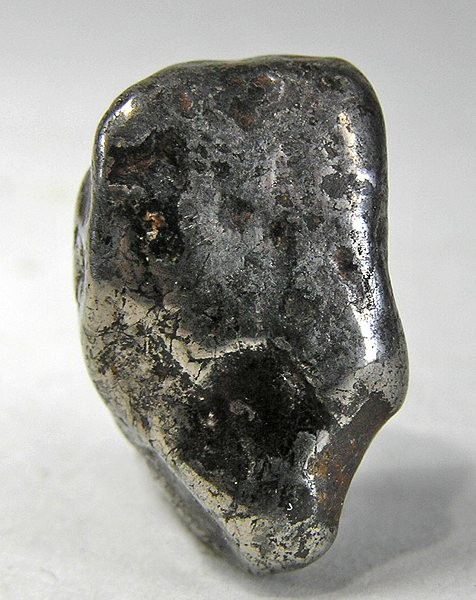
- Awaruite pebble from Josephine County, Oregon, US

General
- Category: Native element mineral
- Formula: Ni_{2}Fe to Ni_{3}Fe
- IMA symbol: Awr
- Strunz classification: 1.AE.20; Metals and intermetallic alloys
- Dana classification: 01.01.11.04; Iron–nickel group
- Crystal system: Cubic
- Crystal class: Hexoctahedral (m3̅m); H-M symbol: (4/m 3̅ 2/m)
- Space group: Pm3̅m

Identification
- Color: Silver-white to grayish white
- Crystal habit: Massive; as pebbles, grains and flakes; rarely as crystals; as rims or regular intergrowths with kamacite in meteorites
- Tenacity: Malleable and flexible
- Mohs scale hardness: 5.5–6
- Luster: Metallic
- Diaphaneity: Opaque
- Specific gravity: 7.8–8.65
- Other characteristics: Strongly magnetic

Awaruite is a naturally occurring alloy of nickel and iron with a composition from Ni_{2}Fe to Ni_{3}Fe.

Awaruite occurs in river placer deposits derived from serpentinized peridotites and ophiolites. It also occurs as a rare component of meteorites. It occurs in association with native gold and magnetite in placers; with copper, heazlewoodite, pentlandite, violarite, chromite, and millerite in peridotites; with kamacite, allabogdanite, schreibersite and graphite in meteorites.

It was first described in 1885 for an occurrence along Gorge River, near Awarua Bay, South Island, New Zealand, its type locality.

Awaruite is also known as josephinite in an occurrence in Josephine County, Oregon where it is found as placer nuggets in stream channels and masses in serpentinized portions of the Josephine peridotite. Some nuggets contain andradite garnet.

Awaruite has been examined as an ore mineral in a large low-grade deposit in central British Columbia, some 90 km northwest of Fort St. James. In the deposit awaruite occurs disseminated in the Mount Sidney Williams ultramafic/ophiolite complex. The ore has an average DTR nickel content of 0.123%. DTR nickel content is the amount determined by "Davis tube recovery", a lab method that gives the amount recoverable using magnetic separation. Another such source is being exploited in Newfoundland by the First Atlantic Nickel Corp. The awaruite contains some cobalt and is approximately 77% nickel.

Awaruite, as well as magnetite and greigite, has been found to catalyze the aqueous reaction of hydrogen and carbon dioxide at 100°C in alkaline conditions to form small concentrations of formate, acetate, pyruvate, methanol and methane.
