= Tetrataenite =

Native metal

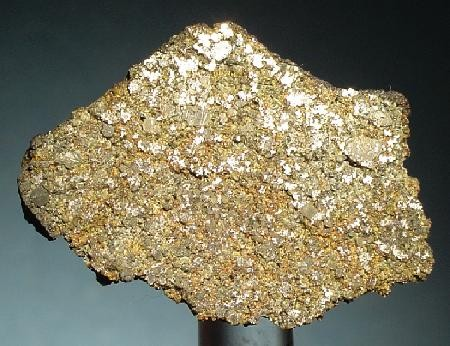
- Silvery-bright tetrataenite crystals

General
- Category: Native element minerals
- Formula: FeNi
- IMA symbol: Ttae
- Strunz classification: 1.AE.10
- Crystal system: Tetragonal
- Crystal class: Domatic (m) (same H-M symbol)
- Space group: P4/mmm
- Unit cell: 22.92 Å³

Identification
- Formula mass: 57.27 gm
- Color: gray white, silver white
- Crystal habit: Granular – Common texture observed in granite and other igneous rock
- Cleavage: none
- Fracture: malleable
- Mohs scale hardness: 3.5
- Luster: metallic
- Streak: gray
- Diaphaneity: opaque
- Density: 8.275
- Common impurities: Co, Cu, P

Tetrataenite is a native metal alloy composed of chemically-ordered L1_{0}-type FeNi, recognized as a mineral in 1980. The mineral is named after its tetragonal crystal structure and its relation to the iron-nickel alloy, taenite, which is chemically disordered (A1) phase with an underlying fcc lattice. Tetrataenite is one of the mineral phases found in meteoric iron. Before its discovery in meteoritic samples, experimental synthesis of the L1_{0} phase was first reported in 1962 by Louis Néel and co-workers, following neutron irradiation of a chemically disordered FeNi sample under an applied magnetic field. Compared to the magnetically soft, chemically disordered A1 phase (taenite), the tetragonal L1_{0} structure of tetrataenite leads to good hard magnetic properties, including a large uniaxial magnetocrystalline anisotropy energy. Consequently, it is under consideration for applications as a rare-earth-free permanent magnet.

== Formation ==
Tetrataenite forms naturally in iron meteorites that contain taenite that are slow-cooled at a rate of a few degrees per million years, which allows for ordering of the Fe and Ni atoms. It is found most abundantly in slow-cooled chondrite meteorites, as well as in mesosiderites. At high (as much as 52%) Ni content and temperatures below 320 °C (the chemical order-disorder transition temperature), tetrataenite is broken down from taenite and distorts its face centered cubic crystal structure to form the chemically ordered, tetragonal L1_{0} structure. Computational investigations into the phase stability of Fe-Ni alloys have suggested that ferromagnetic ordering plays a key role in making the chemically ordered L1_{0} structure thermodynamically stable.

In 2015, it was reported that tetrataenite was found in a terrestrial rock – a magnetite body from the Indo-Myanmar ranges of northeast India.

It is reported that the L1_{0} phase can be synthetically produced by neutron- or electron-irradiation of chemically disordered (A1) FeNi below 593 K, by hydrogen-reduction of nanometric NiFe_{2}O_{4}, or by combined application of mechanical stress and magnetic field during annealing of the chemically disordered A1 phase.

=== Potential laboratory protocols for bulk synthesis ===
==== Applied Stress and Magnetic Field ====
It has been reported that the combined application of mechanical stress and a modest magnetic field during the annealing process can accelerate the formation of the atomically ordered L1_{0} phase in bulk samples.

==== Addition of Phosphorus (Article Retracted) ====
In 2022, it was reported that mixing iron and nickel together in specific quantities, with a phosphorus catalyst, and smelting the mixture, formed tetrataenite in bulk quantities, in seconds. However, in late 2024, the article originally reporting this result was retracted by the journal due to 'misinterpretation of the experimental data'. A subsequent Comment, published by a group containing many of the original article's authors, provided both reinterpretation of the original data as well as new measurements, and showed that the Bragg peaks originally attributed to presence of tetrataenite in the samples were, in fact, caused by the presence of phosphides.

== Crystal structure ==
Tetrataenite has a highly ordered crystal structure, appearing creamy in color and displaying optical anisotropy. Its appearance is distinguishable from taenite, which is dark gray with low reflectivity. FeNi easily forms into a cubic crystal structure, but does not have magnetic anisotropy in this form. Three variants of the L1_{0} tetragonal crystal structure have been found, as chemical ordering can occur along any of the three axes.

== Magnetic properties ==
Tetrataenite displays permanent magnetization, in particular, high coercivity. It has a large uniaxial magnetocrystalline anisotropy and theoretical magnetic energy product, the maximum amount of magnetic energy stored, over 335 kJ m^{−3}. The L1_{0} phase has a theoretical Curie temperature of over 1000 K, resulting in a magnetic anisotropy which is predicted to remain large up to and beyond room temperature.

== Applications ==
Tetrataenite is a candidate for replacing rare-earth permanent magnets such as samarium and neodymium since both iron and nickel are earth-abundant and inexpensive.

== See also ==
- Glossary of meteoritics
- Superlattice
