= Death (disambiguation) =

Death is the irreversible cessation of all biological functions that sustain an organism.

Death, Deceased or Died may also refer to:

== Personification ==
- Angel of Death (disambiguation)
- Personifications of death, or the Grim Reaper, various depictions of Death as a sentient being

== People ==
- Jason Death (born 1971), Australian rugby league footballer
- Steve Death (1949–2003), English football goalkeeper

== Arts, entertainment, and media ==
=== Fictional entities ===
==== Characters ====
- Death (Castlevania), also referred to as the Grim Reaper, a fictional character in the Castlevania video game series
- Death of the Endless, a fictional character in the comic book series The Sandman
- Death (Discworld), a fictional character in Terry Pratchett's Discworld series
- Death (Marvel Comics), a fictional character in comic books published by Marvel
- Death, a fictional video game character from Malice
- Death, depicted in the television show Family Guy
- Death, a high level monster from the game Perfect World
- Death Larson, fictional character, brother of Wolf Larson in Jack London's 1904 novel The Sea-Wolf
- Lord Peter Death Bredon Wimsey (occasional alias Death Bredon), fictional detective in novels by Dorothy Sayers
- Death, a character who first appeared in the episode "Death in Bloom" of the animated series Adventure Time
- Death, a character from the animated film Puss in Boots: The Last Wish

==== Places ====
- Death (place), the underworld, a place of death where departed spirits go awaiting judgment
- Death, a fictional location in the Old Kingdom by Garth Nix

=== Literature ===
- Death: Chuck Schuldiner's lyrics, 2000 book about the death metal band, Death
- "A Death", 2015 short story by Stephen King
- Death: An Essay on Finitude, book by Françoise Dastur

=== Musical artists ===
==== Albums and songs ====
- Death (album), by Teitanblood
- Death, an album by Mr. Kitty
- Death (EP), by Thy Serpent
- "Death" (Melanie Martinez song), 2023
- "Death" (Trippie Redd song), 2019
- "Death" (White Lies song), 2008
- "Death", the original title for the song "Fiction" by Avenged Sevenfold, from Nightmare, 2010
- "Death", a song by C418 from Minecraft – Volume Alpha, 2011
- "Death", a song by Devin Townsend from Physicist, 2000
- "Death", a song by Judas Priest from Nostradamus, 2008
- "Death", a song by Skinny Puppy from The Process, 1996
- "Death", a song by The Velvet Teen from Out of the Fierce Parade, 2002
- "Death", a song by War of Ages from Dominion, 2023
- "Died" (song), by Alice in Chains
- "Real Death", by Mount Eerie from A Crow Looked At Me

==== Performers ====
- Death (metal band), American death metal band from Altamonte Springs, Florida
- Death (proto-punk band), American punk/proto rock from Detroit, Michigan

=== Theatre ===
- Death (play), by Woody Allen

=== Statues and sculptures ===
- Death (statue) by Isamu Noguchi

=== Television ===
- "Death" (Fullmetal Alchemist), a 2004 episode
- "Death" (Not Going Out), a 2006 episode
- "Death" (QI), a 2006 episode
- "Death" (South Park), a 1997 episode
- "Death" (Stewart Lee's Comedy Vehicle), a 2016 episode

== Other uses ==
- Death (cigarette), a brand of cigarettes introduced in the UK in 1991 by The Enlightened Tobacco Company
- Death (tarot card), a Major Arcana tarot card

== See also ==
- De'Ath
- Dead (disambiguation)
- Dr. Death (disambiguation)
- Near-death (disambiguation)
- Sudden death (disambiguation)
- The Dead (disambiguation)
- Wall of death (disambiguation)
- Omega (disambiguation)
- Ending (disambiguation)
- Demolition (disambiguation)
