= Moriturus =

Moriturus may refer to:

- Moriturus (film), a 1920 German silent crime film

== See also ==
- Morituris, a 2011 Italian horror film directed by Raffaele Picchio
- "Nemo moriturus praesumitur mentiri" ("no one on the point of death should be presumed to be lying"), a medieval legal principle for a dying declaration
- Morituri (disambiguation)
