= Forever Dead =

Forever Dead may refer to:

== Songs ==
- "Forever Dead" (Sevendust song), an alternate title for the 2010 Sevendust song "Forever" (Sevendust song) off the album Cold Day Memory
- "Forever Dead" (RAGE song), a 2012 song by RAGE off the album 21 (Rage album)
- "Forever Dead" (SOIL song), a 2006 song by SOIL off the album True Self

== Other uses ==
- Forever Dead (film), a 2007 film from Brain Damage Films
- The Forever Dead (novel), a novel by John Birmingham, volume 3 in The Cruel Stars trilogy

== See also ==
- Dead Forever (disambiguation)
- Forever (disambiguation)
- Dead (disambiguation)
