= The Dead =

The Dead may refer to:

- The dead, those who have experienced death

== Arts, entertainment, and media ==
=== Literature ===
- The Dead (Higson novel), 2010 novel by Charlie Higson
- The Dead (Kracht novel), 2016 novel by Christian Kracht
- The Dead (poem), by Rupert Brooke
- The Dead (Joyce short story), by James Joyce
- The Dead (Oates short story), by Joyce Carol Oates
- The Dead (Swanwick short story), by Michael Swanwick
- The Dead, a novel by Ingrid Black

=== Film and television ===
- The Dead (1987 film), adapted from the James Joyce short story
- The Dead (2010 film), a British horror film
- The Dead (2014 film), a Mexican drama film
- The Dead 2: India (2013), a sequel to the 2010 film
- "The Dead" (American Horror Story), a 2013 episode of the anthology television series

=== Music ===
- The Dead, 1987 album by Theatre of Ice
- The Dead (band), a rock band composed of former members of the Grateful Dead
- The Dead, a nickname for the band The Grateful Dead

=== Stage productions ===
- James Joyce's The Dead, Broadway musical

== Places ==
- De Dodes Fjord (The Fjord of the Dead)

== See also ==
- Dead (disambiguation)
- Death (disambiguation)
