= List of Angels Fall First editions =

Angels Fall First is the debut album of Finnish symphonic/power metal quintet Nightwish. It was released in 1997 by Spinefarm Records. The limited edition (of which only 500 copies were released), features only seven tracks, two of which are not on the regular edition. Today, Angels Fall First has sold more than 36,000 copies in Finland alone.

Even though the only single, "The Carpenter" reached number three on the Finnish singles chart, Nightwish failed to gain national fame until the release of their second studio album, Oceanborn.

The male vocals heard on "Beauty and the Beast", "The Carpenter", "Astral Romance" and "Once Upon a Troubadour" are sung by Tuomas Holopainen, and the whispers in the beginning of the demo version of "Etiäinen" is also done by Holopainen. After this album Holopainen never sang on an album again, because he thought that he was not good enough. However, he provides some of the background sounds on "Moondance" of the second album Oceanborn and on "Master Passion Greed" of the sixth album Dark Passion Play.

== Limited Edition (1997) ==
| | Title | Writers | Length |
|---|---|---|---|
| 1. | "Astral Romance" | Holopainen | 5:12 |
| 2. | "Angels Fall First" | Holopainen | 5:34 |
| 3. | "The Carpenter" | Holopainen | 5:57 |
| 4. | "Nymphomaniac Fantasia" | Holopainen | 4:47 |
| 5. | "Once Upon a Troubadour" | Holopainen | 5:21 |
| 6. | "A Return to the Sea" | Holopainen | 5:47 |
| 7. | "Lappi (Lapland): I. Erämaajärvi" | Holopainen | 2:15 |
| 8. | "Lappi (Lapland): II. Witchdrums" | Holopainen | 1:18 |
| 9. | "Lappi (Lapland): III. This Moment is Eternity" | Holopainen | 3:12 |
| 10. | "Lappi (Lapland): IV. Etiäinen" | Holopainen | 2:32 |

== Regular Edition (1997) ==
| | Title | Writers | Length |
|---|---|---|---|
| 1. | "Elvenpath" | Holopainen | 4:38 |
| 2. | "Beauty and the Beast" | Holopainen | 6:22 |
| 3. | "The Carpenter" | Holopainen | 5:56 |
| 4. | "Astral Romance" | Holopainen | 5:11 |
| 5. | "Angels Fall First" | Holopainen | 5:34 |
| 6. | "Tutankhamen" | Holopainen | 5:30 |
| 7. | "Nymphomaniac Fantasia" | Holopainen | 4:45 |
| 8. | "Know Why the Nightingale Sings" | Holopainen | 4:13 |
| 9. | "Lappi (Lapland): I. Erämaajärvi" | Holopainen | 2:15 |
| 10. | "Lappi (Lapland): II. Witchdrums" | Holopainen | 1:19 |
| 11. | "Lappi (Lapland): III. This Moment is Eternity" | Holopainen | 3:12 |
| 12. | "Lappi (Lapland): IV. Etiäinen" | Holopainen | 2:34 |

== Korean Edition (1999) ==
| | Title | Writers | Length |
|---|---|---|---|
| 1. | "Elvenpath" | Holopainen | 4:38 |
| 2. | "Beauty and the Beast" | Holopainen | 6:22 |
| 3. | "The Carpenter" | Holopainen | 5:56 |
| 4. | "Astral Romance" | Holopainen | 5:11 |
| 5. | "Angels Fall First" | Holopainen | 5:34 |
| 6. | "Tutankhamen" | Holopainen | 5:30 |
| 7. | "Nymphomaniac Fantasia" | Holopainen | 4:45 |
| 8. | "Know Why the Nightingale Sings" | Holopainen | 4:13 |
| 9. | "Lappi (Lapland): I. Erämaajärvi" | Holopainen | 2:15 |
| 10. | "Lappi (Lapland): II. Witchdrums" | Holopainen | 1:19 |
| 11. | "Lappi (Lapland): III. This Moment is Eternity" | Holopainen | 3:12 |
| 12. | "Lappi (Lapland): IV. Etiäinen" | Holopainen | 2:34 |
| 13. | "Sleeping Sun" | Holopainen | 4:03 |
| 14. | "Once Upon A Troubadour" | Holopainen | 5:21 |
| 15. | "A Return to the Sea" | Holopainen | 5:46 |

== Japanese Remastered Edition (2004) ==
| | Title | Writers | Length |
|---|---|---|---|
| 1. | "Elvenpath" | Holopainen | 4:40 |
| 2. | "Beauty and the Beast" | Holopainen | 6:24 |
| 3. | "The Carpenter" | Holopainen | 5:57 |
| 4. | "Astral Romance" | Holopainen | 5:12 |
| 5. | "Angels Fall First" | Holopainen | 5:34 |
| 6. | "Tutankhamen" | Holopainen | 5:31 |
| 7. | "Nymphomaniac Fantasia" | Holopainen | 4:47 |
| 8. | "Know Why the Nightingale Sings" | Holopainen | 4:14 |
| 9. | "Lappi (Lapland): I. Erämaajärvi" | Holopainen | 2:15 |
| 10. | "Lappi (Lapland): II. Witchdrums" | Holopainen | 1:19 |
| 11. | "Lappi (Lapland): III. This Moment is Eternity" | Holopainen | 3:12 |
| 12. | "Lappi (Lapland): IV. Etiäinen" | Holopainen | 2:34 |
| 13. | "A Return to the Sea" | Holopainen | 5:48 |
| 14. | "Swanheart-Live" | Holopainen | 3:56 |
| 15. | "Deep Silent Complete-Live" | Holopainen | 4:28 |
| 16. | "Dead Boy's Poem-Live" | Holopainen | 6:53 |

== Nightwish Reloaded Edition (2007) ==
| | Title | Writers | Length |
|---|---|---|---|
| 1. | "Elvenpath" | Holopainen | 4:38 |
| 2. | "Beauty and the Beast" | Holopainen | 6:22 |
| 3. | "The Carpenter" | Holopainen | 5:56 |
| 4. | "Astral Romance" | Holopainen | 5:11 |
| 5. | "Angels Fall First" | Holopainen | 5:34 |
| 6. | "Tutankhamen" | Holopainen | 5:30 |
| 7. | "Nymphomaniac Fantasia" | Holopainen | 4:45 |
| 8. | "Know Why the Nightingale Sings" | Holopainen | 4:13 |
| 9. | "Lappi (Lapland): I. Erämaajärvi" | Holopainen | 2:15 |
| 10. | "Lappi (Lapland): II. Witchdrums" | Holopainen | 1:19 |
| 11. | "Lappi (Lapland): III. This Moment is Eternity" | Holopainen | 3:12 |
| 12. | "Lappi (Lapland): IV. Etiäinen" | Holopainen | 2:34 |
| 13. | "A Return to the Sea" | Holopainen | 5:46 |
| 14. | "Nightwish" (Demo) | Holopainen | 5:49 |
| 15. | "Forever Moments" (Demo) | Holopainen | 5:36 |
| 16. | "Etiäinen" (Demo) | Holopainen | 2:59 |
