= Cape Melville (Greenland) =

Headland in the Avannaata municipality, Greenland

Cape Melville Nallortup Nuua
- Cape
- Coordinates: 76°2′53″N 64°2′40″W
- Location: Avannaata, Greenland
- Offshore water bodies: Baffin Bay

Area
  - Total: Arctic
- Elevation: 275 m (902 ft)

Cape Melville (Danish: Kap Melville; Greenlandic: Nallortup Nuua) is a headland in the Avannaata municipality, NW Greenland.

== Geography ==
Cape Melville is located at the eastern end of Meteor Bay.

The cape lies at the northern limits of Melville Bay to the east of Cape York. A chain of small coastal islands stretches between the two capes, the largest of which is Meteorite Island.

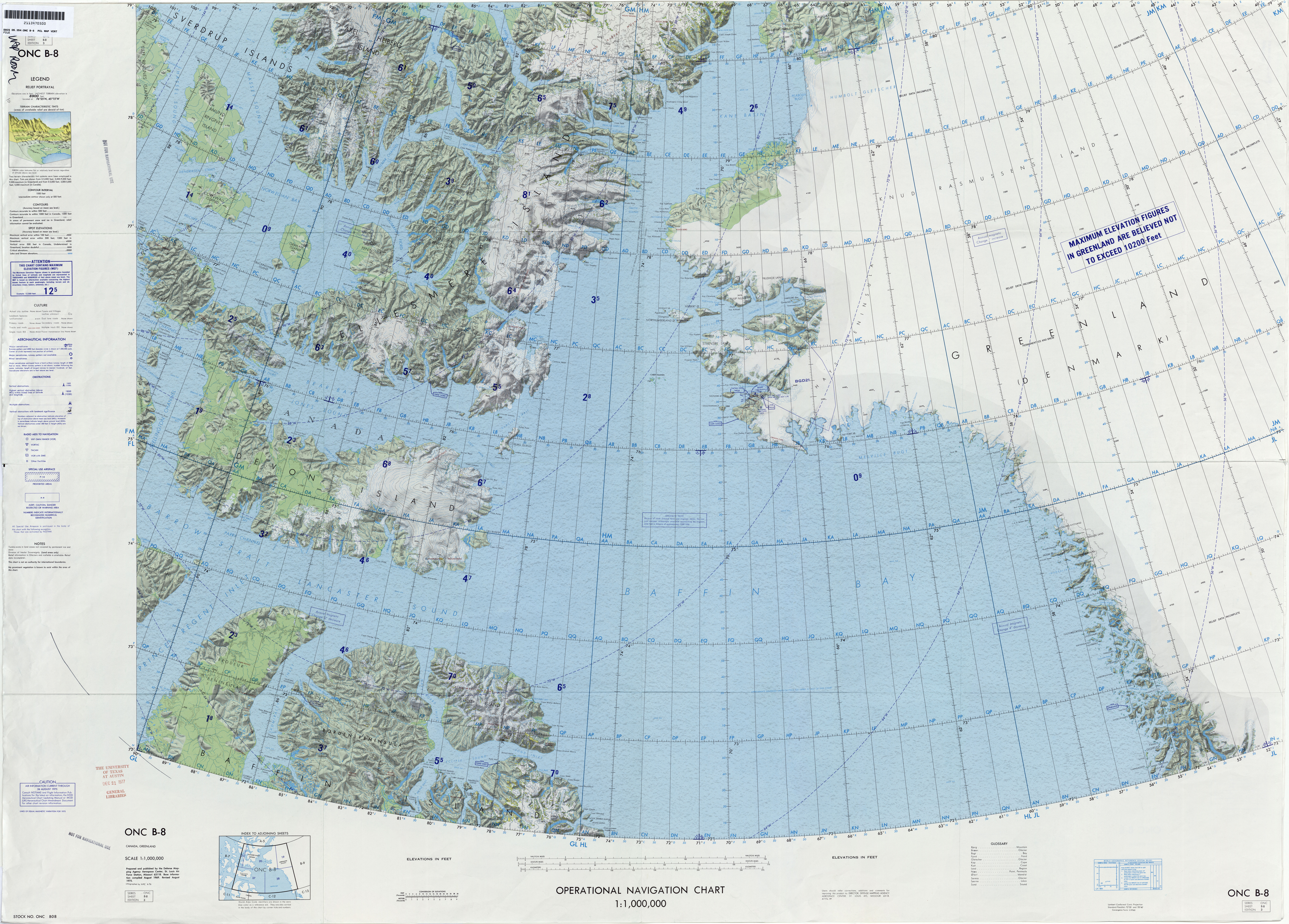
Map of Northwestern Greenland

== See also ==
- Cape York meteorite
