= Dead Forever =

Dead Forever may refer to:

- Dead Forever... (album), 1972 album by Buffalo
- "Dead Forever" (Buffalo song), 1972 song by Buffalo, title track off the album Dead Forever...
- "Dead Forever" (Unleashed song), 1991 song by Unleashed off the album Where No Life Dwells
- "Dead Forever" (Steel Attack song), 2006 song by Steel Attack off the album Diabolic Symphony
- Octopus Pie: Dead Forever (book), 2014 anthology collection of the webcomic Octopus Pie
- Dead Forever: Live at Sphere, a concert residency by Dead & Company
- "Dead Forever" (Venturing song), 2025 song by Venturing off the album Ghostholding

== See also ==
- Forever Dead (disambiguation)
- Forever (disambiguation)
- Dead (disambiguation)
