= Cape York (Greenland) =

Cape on the northwestern coast of Greenland

Cape York Perlernerit
- Cape
- Coordinates: 75.92°N 66.45°W
- Location: Avannaata, Greenland
- Offshore water bodies: Baffin Bay

Area
  - Total: Arctic

Cape York (Greenlandic: Perlernerit, Danish: Kap York) is a cape on the northwestern coast of Greenland, in northern Baffin Bay.

== Geography ==
It is a pronounced projection. It delimits the northwestern end of 190-mile (310 km) Melville Bay, with the other end commonly defined as Wilcox Head, the western promontory on Kiatassuaq Island. De Dodes Fjord and Sidebriksfjord are north of the cape, and the Crimson Cliffs to the west.

A chain of small coastal islands stretches between Cape York and Cape Melville to the east, the largest of which is Meteorite Island. The cape is 37 km (23 mi) west-south-west of Savissivik, the settlement on Meteorite Island.

There was one nearer permanent settlement, Perlernerit, approximately 2 kilometres (1.2 mi) northeast of the cape.

== History ==
The cape was the one of many places visited in 1894 by Admiral Robert Peary during his second expedition to the Arctic. A way east across the bay is the island of discovery of the Cape York Meteorite fragments. In the Greenlandic language, the name of the settlement Savissivik on the island close to the cape means 'place of meteorite iron' (savik = iron/knife), alluding to the numerous meteorites from 10,000 years ago that have been found in the area. The meteorite is estimated to have weighed 100 tonnes before it exploded. The iron from the meteorite attracted migrating Inuit from Arctic Canada.

== Photographs ==
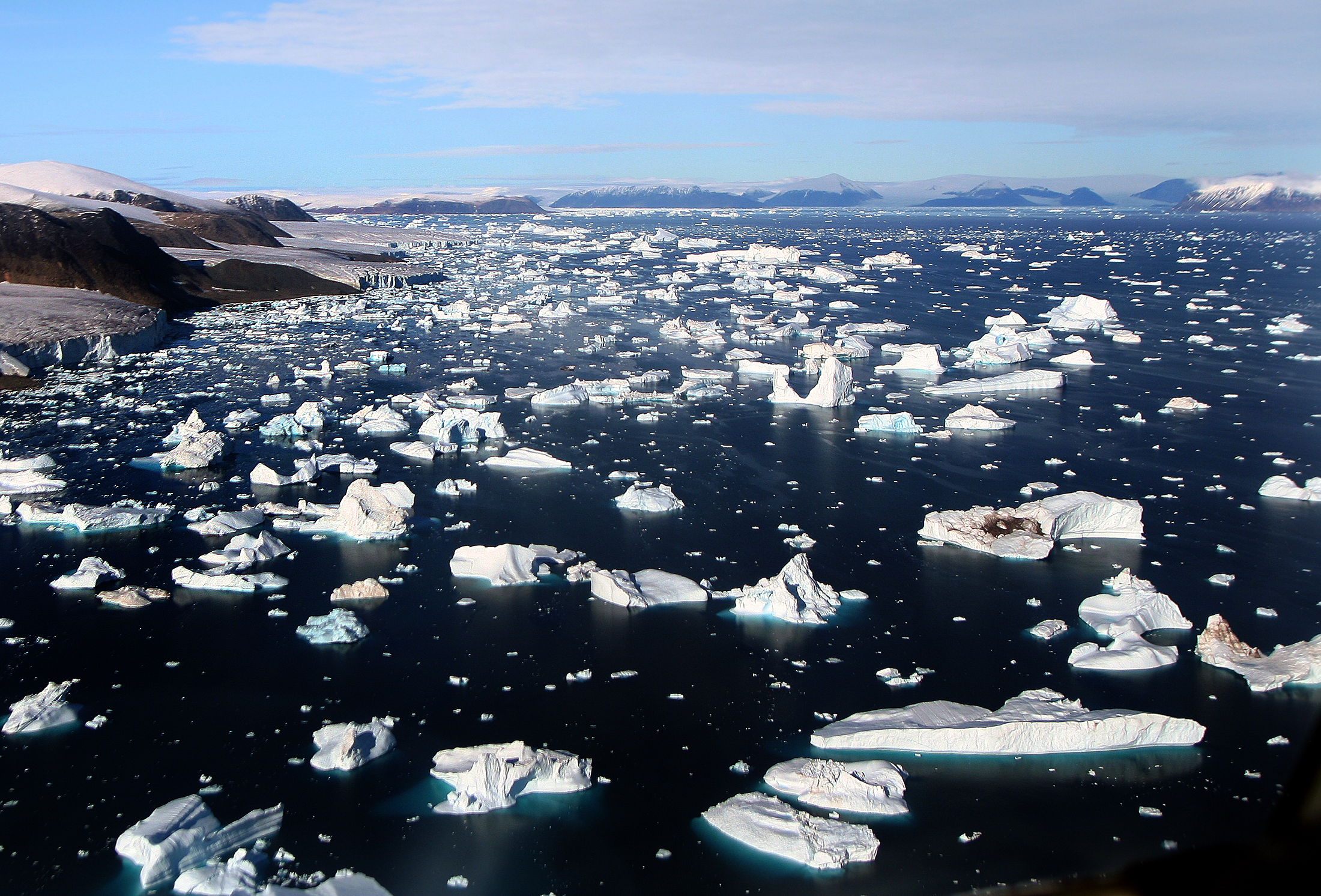
Glaciers and icebergs at Cape York, Greenland

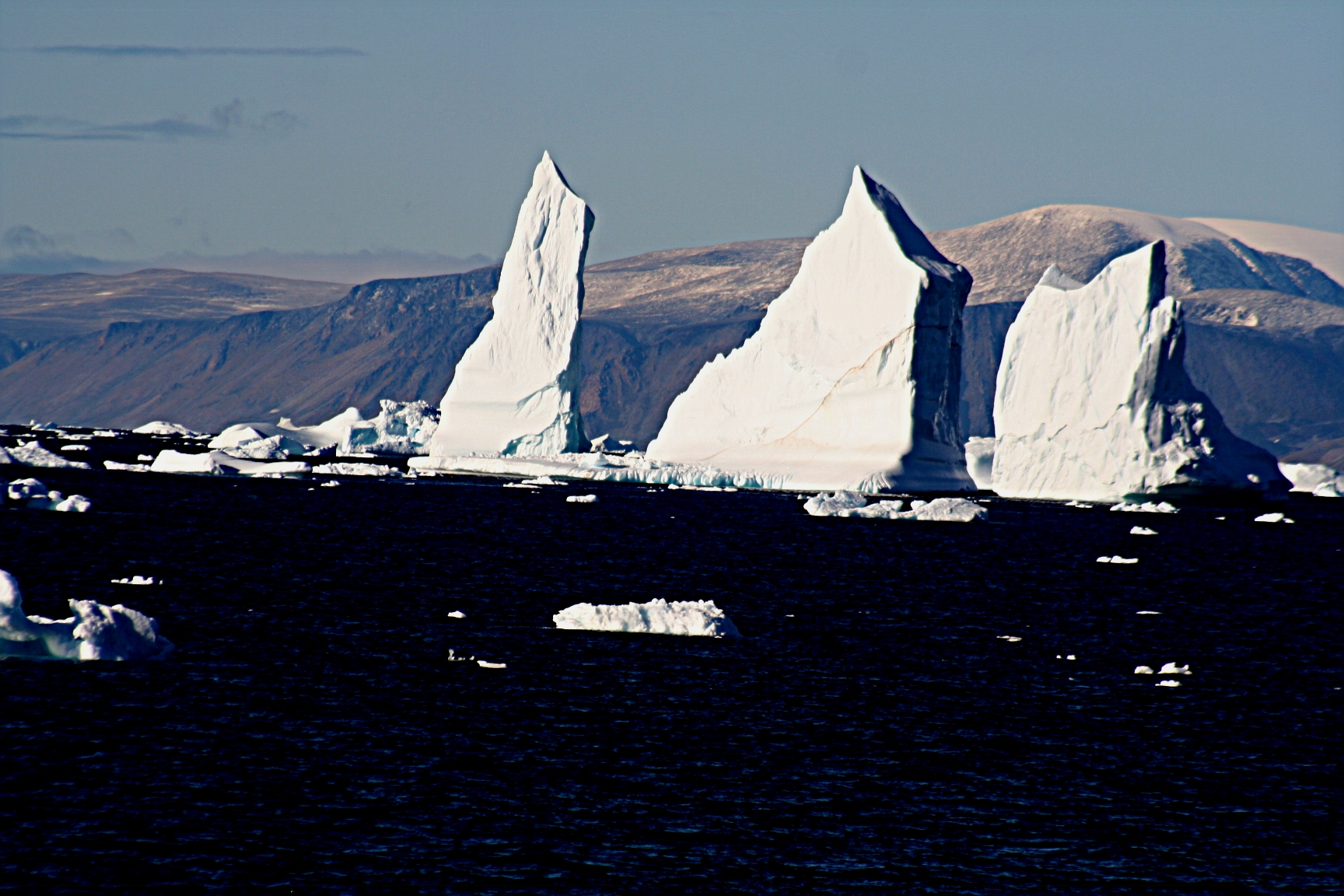
Cape York

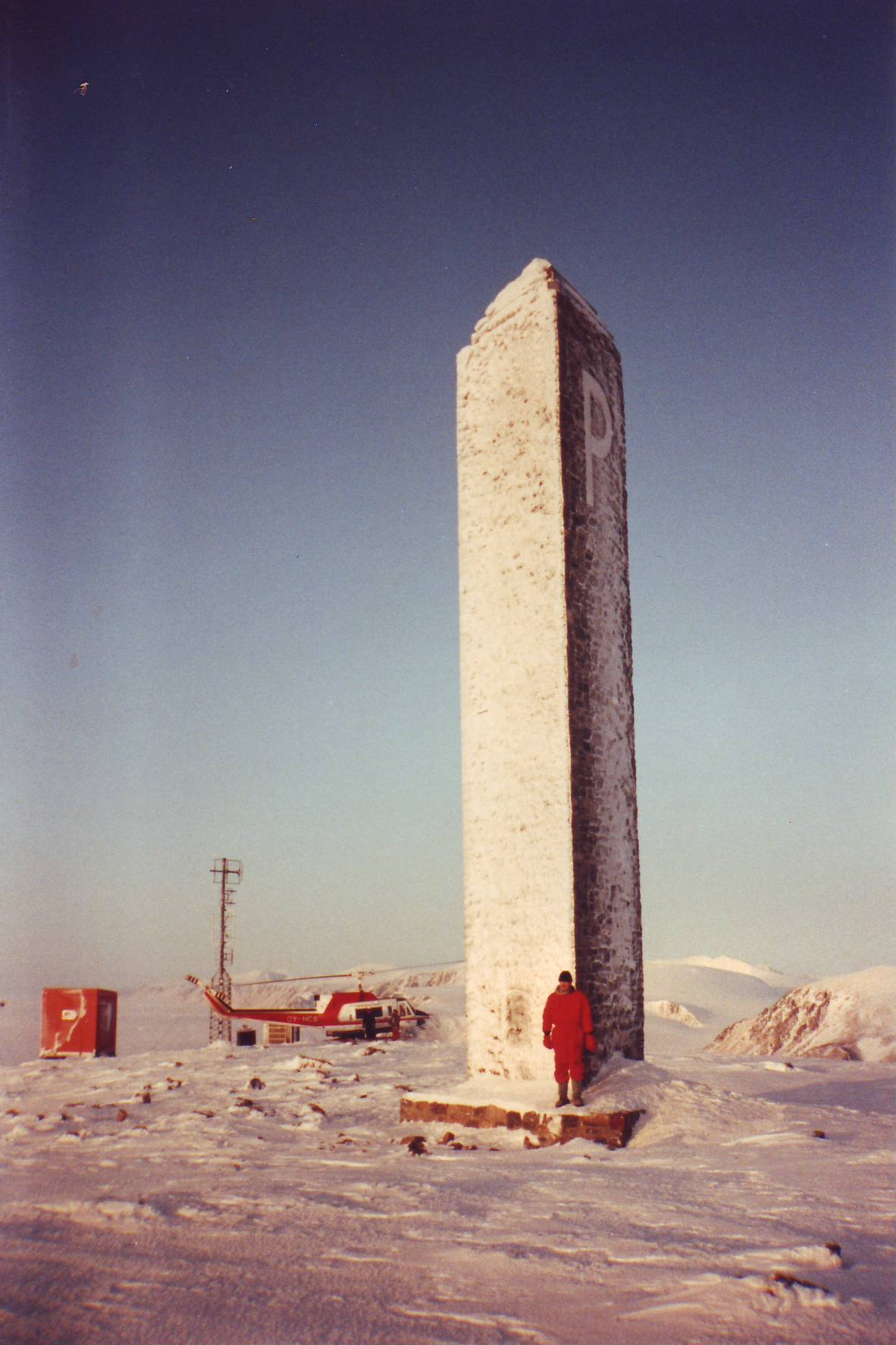
Robert Peary monument at Cape York

== See also ==
- Meteorite Island
