= Savissivik Heliport =

Heliport in Greenland

- IATA: SVR; ICAO: BGSV

Summary
- Airport type: Public
- Operator: Greenland Airport Authority (Mittarfeqarfiit)
- Serves: Savissivik, Greenland
- Elevation AMSL: 24 ft / 7 m
- Coordinates: 76°01′07″N 065°07′03″W
- Website: Savissivik Heliport

Map
- Location in Greenland

Helipads
Number	Length		Surface
Number	m	ft	Surface
1	30 × 20	98 × 66	Asphalt
- Source: Danish AIS

Savissivik Heliport (IATA: SVR, ICAO: BGSV) is a heliport in Savissivik, a village on Meteorite Island, off the shores of the northern end of Melville Bay in Avannaata municipality, northern Greenland. The heliport is considered a helistop, and is served by Air Greenland as part of a government contract.

== Airlines and destinations ==
Airlines	Destinations
Air Greenland (settlement flights)	Pituffik Space Base

Air Greenland operates government contract flights to villages in the Qaanaaq area. These mostly cargo flights are not featured in the timetable, although they can be pre-booked. Departure times for these flights as specified during booking are by definition approximate, with the settlement service optimized on the fly depending on local demand for a given day.

=== Transfers at Pituffik Space Base ===
Travellers bound for Pituffik Space Base in Pituffik are required to apply for access permit from either Rigsombudsmanden in Nuuk (residents of Greenland), or the Danish Foreign Ministry (all others). Failure to present the permit during check-in results in denial of boarding. The same rules apply for transfers at Pituffik, a stopover necessary for flights from Savissivik to Qaanaaq.
