= Carlsbergite =

Chromium nitride mineral found in meteorites

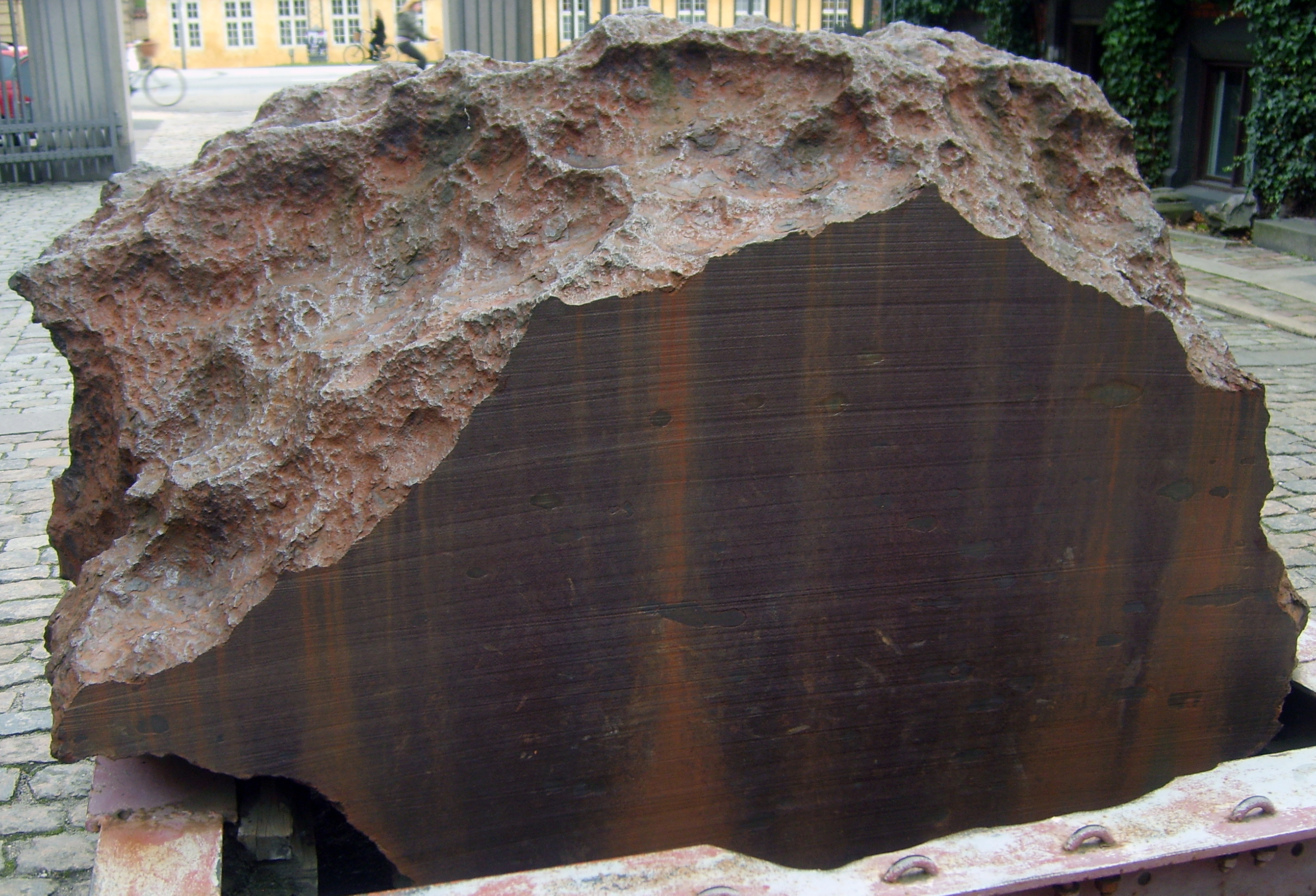
- Carlsbergite was first described in the Agpalilik fragment of the Cape York meteorite.

General
- Category: Minerals
- Formula: CrN
- IMA symbol: Cbg
- Strunz classification: 1.BC.15
- Dana classification: 01.01.20.01
- Crystal system: Cubic
- Crystal class: Hexoctahedral (m3̅m); H-M symbol: (4/m 3̅ 2/m)
- Space group: Fm3̅m
- Unit cell: a = 4.16 Å; Z = 4

Identification
- Color: Light gray in reflected light with rose tint
- Crystal habit: Oriented microscopic platelets, irregular to feathery grains
- Mohs scale hardness: 7
- Luster: Metallic
- Diaphaneity: Opaque
- Specific gravity: 5.9

Carlsbergite is a nitride mineral that has the chemical formula CrN, or chromium nitride.

It is named after the Carlsberg Foundation which backed the recovery of the Agpalilik fragment of the Cape York meteorite in which the mineral was first described.

It occurs in meteorites along the grain boundaries of kamacite (nickel-rich native iron) or troilite (FeS: iron sulfide) in the form of tiny plates. It occurs associated with kamacite, taenite, daubreelite, troilite and sphalerite, (Zn,Fe)S.

In addition to the Cape York meteorite, carlsbergite has been reported from:

- the North Chile meteorite in the Antofagasta Province, Chile
- the Nentmannsdorf meteorite of Bahretal, Saxony, Germany
- the Okinawa Trough, Senkaku Islands, Okinawa Prefecture, Japan
- the Uwet meteorite of Cross River State, Nigeria
- the Sikhote-Alin meteorite, Sikhote-Alin Mountains, Russia
- the Hex River Mountains meteorite from the Cape Winelands District, Western Cape Province, South Africa
- the Canyon Diablo meteorite of Meteor Crater, Coconino County, Arizona, United States
- the Smithonia meteorite of Oglethorpe County, Georgia, United States
- the Kenton County meteorite of Kenton County, Kentucky, United States
- the Lombard meteorite of Broadwater County, Montana, United States
- the Murphy meteorite of Cherokee County and the Lick Creek meteorite of Davidson County, North Carolina, United States
- the New Baltimore meteorite of Somerset County, Pennsylvania, United States
