= Wall of death (disambiguation) =

The wall of death is a carnival or fairground sideshow.

Wall of death may also refer to:

- Wall of death (moshing)
- Wall of Death (film)
- The Wall of Death, a public art installation in Seattle, Washington, US
- The Wall of Death (Scotland Yard), short film

== Music ==
- "Wall of Death" (Murphy's Law song)
- "Wall of Death" (Richard and Linda Thompson song)
