= Near Death Experience (disambiguation) =

Near-death experience refers to a broad range of personal experiences associated with impending death.

Near Death Experience or Near Death may also refer to:

- Near Death (comics), a comic book by Jay Faerber
- Near Death Experience (Cro-Mags album)
- Near Death Experience (Spektr album)
- Near Death Experience (film), a French drama film
- Near Death (1989 film), a documentary film by Frederick Wiseman
- Near Death (2025 film), a Philippine supernatural horror film
- Near Death Experience, the original name of the British metal band One Minute Silence
- "Near Death Experience", the 2005 Summer Special episode of the British TV detective series A Touch of Frost
- Near miss (safety), a situation where death is narrowly avoided

== See also ==
- About to Die, an EP by Dirty Projectors
- Death row
- End-of-life care
- Last Rites
- Lethal (disambiguation)
- Life review
- Morituri (disambiguation)
- Out-of-body experience
- Terminal illness
