= Chromium nitride =

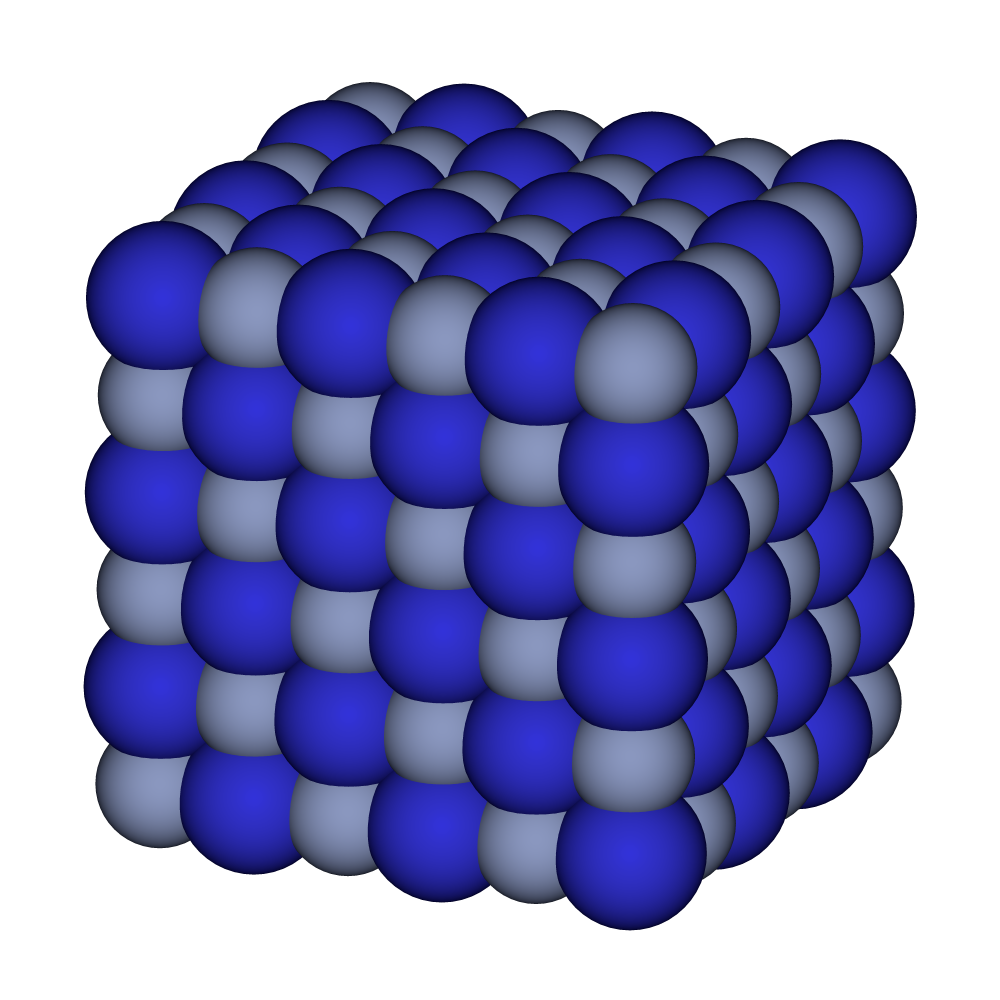
- Chromium nitride

Names
- IUPAC name Chromium nitride
- Other names Chromium(III) nitride

Identifiers
| CAS Number | 24094-93-7 |
| 3D model (JSmol) | Interactive image |
| ChemSpider | 81581 |
| ECHA InfoCard | 100.041.819 |
| EC Number | 246-016-3 |
| PubChem CID | 90362 |
| UNII | W46I1HZ91F |
- InChI: InChI=1S/Cr.N Key: CXOWYMLTGOFURZ-UHFFFAOYSA-N; InChI=1/Cr.N/rCrN/c1-2 Key: CXOWYMLTGOFURZ-NIYUYJRQAK
- SMILES: [Cr]#N

Properties
| Chemical formula | CrN |
| Molar mass | 66.003 g/mol |
| Appearance | Black powder |
| Density | 5.9 g/cm^{3} |
| Melting point | 1770 ˚C (decomposes at) |
| Solubility in water | Insoluble |

Thermochemistry
| Std molar entropy (S^{⦵}_{298}) | 37.75 J K^{−1} mol^{−1} |
| Std enthalpy of formation (Δ_{f}H^{⦵}_{298}) | −117.15 kJ/mol |

Hazards
| Flash point | Non-flammable |
- NIOSH (US health exposure limits)
| PEL (Permissible) | TWA 1 mg/m^{3} |
| REL (Recommended) | TWA 0.5 mg/m^{3} |
| IDLH (Immediate danger) | 250 mg/m^{3} |

Related compounds
| Related compounds | Dichromium nitride |
- Except where otherwise noted, data are given for materials in their standard state (at 25 °C [77 °F], 100 kPa). verify (what is ?) Infobox references

Chromium nitride is a chromium and nitrogen chemical compound with the formula CrN. It is very hard and is extremely resistant to corrosion. It is an interstitial compound, with nitrogen atoms occupying the octahedral holes in the chromium lattice: as such, it is not strictly a chromium(III) compound nor does it contain nitride ions (N^{3−}). Chromium forms a second interstitial nitride, dichromium nitride, Cr_{2}N.

== Occurrence ==
Though rare, carlsbergite - the natural form of chromium nitride - occurs in some meteorites.

== Synthesis ==
Chromium(III) nitride can be prepared by the direct combination of chromium and nitrogen at 800 °C:

2 Cr + N_{2} → 2 CrN

It can also be synthesized by physical vapor deposition techniques such as cathodic arc deposition.

=== Synthesis as Thin Film ===
Chromium(III) nitride can also be prepared in the form of a Thin film. This is typically done either by a Physical Vapor Deposition method or a Chemical Vapor Deposition method. It is also important to note that for these methods a substrate is required unlike thin film membranes

==== Synthesis by Physical Vapor Deposition. ====
The most popular method for the deposition/synthesis by Physical vapor Deposition is carried out by cold plasma processes like Magnetron Sputtering.

==== Synthesis by Chemical Vapor Deposition. ====
Chemical Vapor deposition for Chromium(III) nitride is a relatively novel technique that remains under optimization.

== Applications ==
CrN is used as a coating material for corrosion resistance and in metal forming and plastic moulding applications. CrN is often used on medical implants and tools. CrN is also a valuable component in advanced multicomponent coating systems, such as CrAlN, for hard, wear-resistant applications on cutting tools.

== Magnetism ==
The fundamental materials physics of CrN, giving rise to its favorable properties, has been debated recently in high-profile scientific journals such as Nature Materials. In particular, the importance of magnetism in both the low temperature and the high temperature phases has been demonstrated by using quantum mechanical calculations of the compound's electronic structure.
