= University of Copenhagen Geological Museum =

- Geologisk Museum
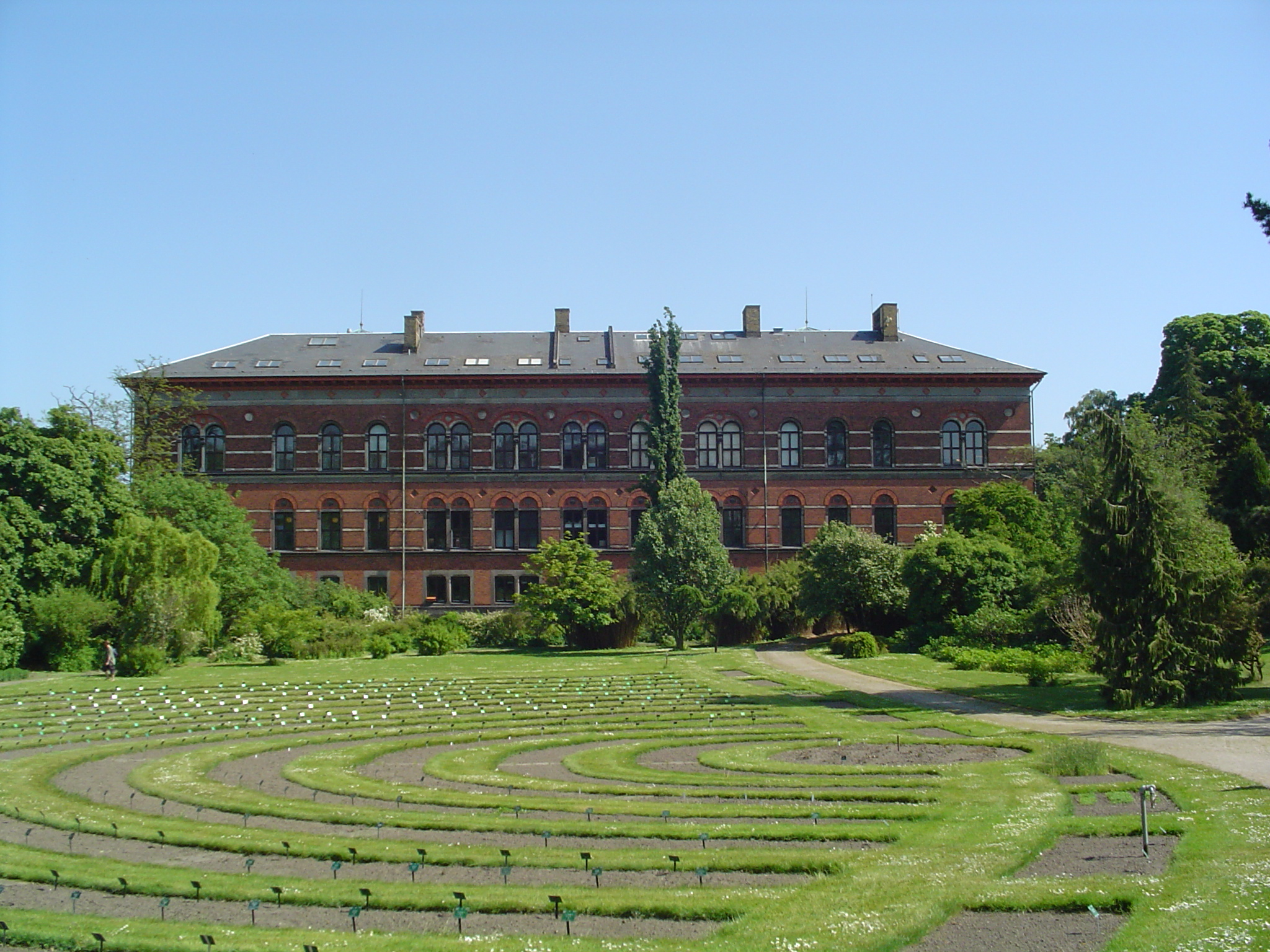
- Location: Øster Voldgade 5-7, 1350 Copenhagen, Denmark
- Coordinates: 55.6875°N 12.5767°E
- Type: Natural History Museum
- Director: Nina Rønsted
- Website: http://geologi.snm.ku.dk/english/

The Geological Museum was a separate geology museum located at the northeast corner of the Copenhagen Botanical Garden, in Copenhagen, Denmark. Although its location remains the same and the main exhibits have been maintained, it is now part of the Natural History Museum of Denmark rather than a separate museum. In addition to housing exhibits, it also facilitates research and study as part of the University of Copenhagen, with some of the museum staff actively partaking in research worldwide.

== History ==
The Geological Museum opened in 1772 as the "Universitetets Nye Naturaltheater" (The New Natural Theatre of the University) and contains specimens which have been in museum collections for more than 300 years. Its original location was in Nørregade, but in 1893 the museum moved into the current building, which was newly built to house the museum. From 1810 to 1976 the name of the museum was Mineralogisk Museum.

In 2004, it was merged with other natural history museums in Copenhagen and in 2020 the combined entity was officially renamed the Natural History Museum of Denmark.

== Collections ==
The collections at the Geological Museum have been built up through centuries and include large collections of minerals, fossils, petrology, and meteorites.

== Exhibitions ==
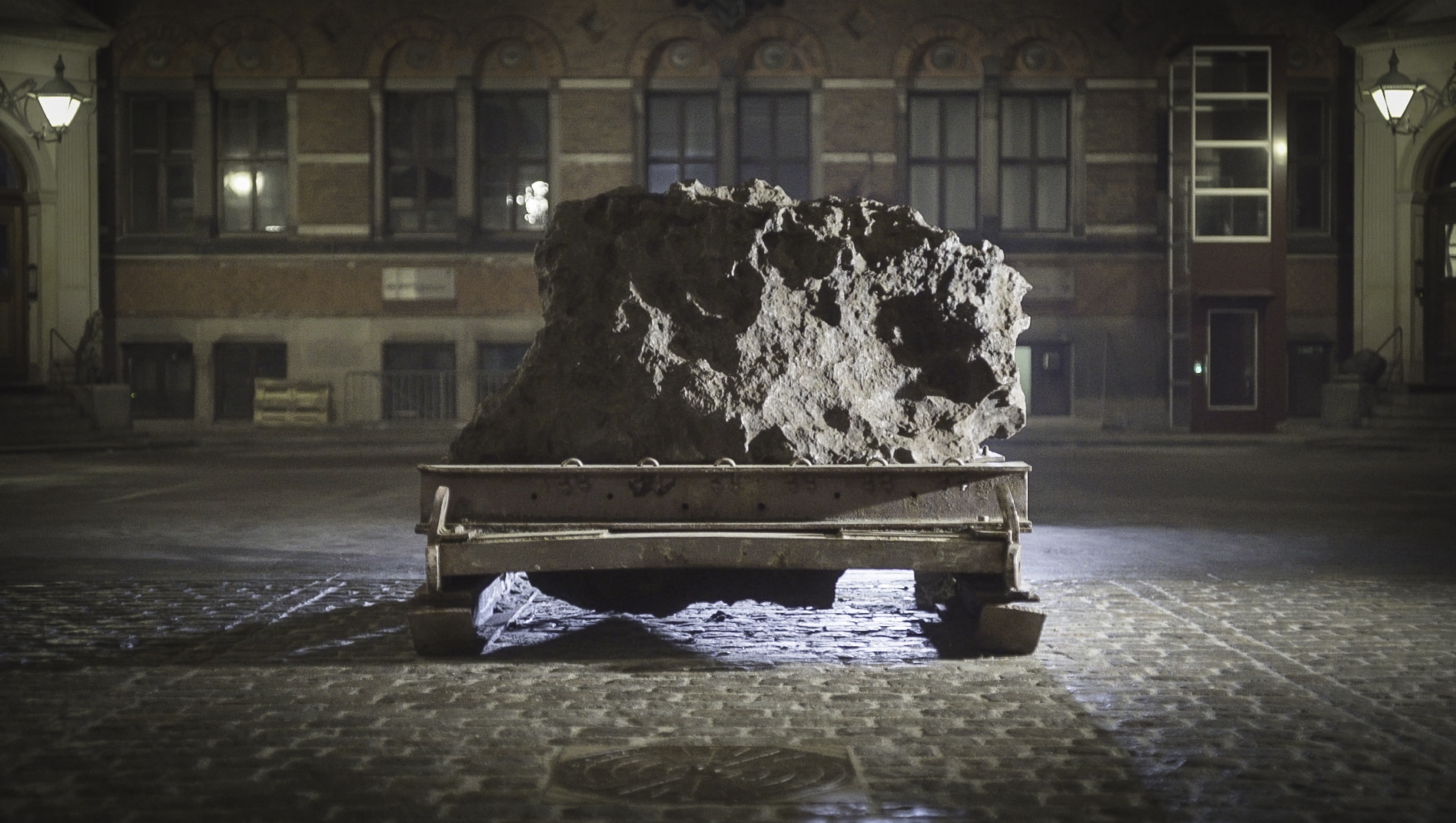
The Agpalilik meteorite outside the Geological Museum

The museum features changing exhibitions as well as permanent ones such as The Mineral Exhibition where the minerals are presented in a crystal chemical order starting with elements such as gold and silver and ending with silicates such as feldspar and zeolites.

The Agpalilik meteorite, a part of the Cape York meteorite weighing some 20 tons, can be seen in the museum courtyard. Also on exhibit is a small rock from the Taurus-Littrow region of the Moon, brought back by the Apollo 17 astronauts in 1972.
