= Lords of Twilight =

Studio album by Thy Serpent
- Released: May 19, 1997
- Genre: Black metal
- Length: 36:05
- Label: Spinefarm

Thy Serpent chronology
Forests of Witchery (1996)	Lords of Twilight (1997)	Christcrusher (1998)

Professional ratings
Review scores
Source	Rating
Metal Crypt	3/5 stars

Lords of Twilight is the second studio album released by Finnish black metal band Thy Serpent. It is a MCD and contains old demo-songs re-recorded and a few new songs. It was released through Spinefarm Records on 19 May 1997.

== Track listing ==
No.	Title	Length
1.	"Prometheus Unbound"	2:27
2.	"The Forest of Blåkulla"	5:24
3.	"Ode to the Witches (Part IV)"	1:35
4.	"In Blackened Dreams"	7:19
5.	"As Mist Descends from the Hills"	2:15
6.	"Unknown"	5:17
7.	"Epic Torment"	2:44
8.	"In Blackened Dreams (unreleased version)"	3:46
9.	"Ode to the Witches (Part III)"	5:18
Total length:		36:09

== Line-up ==
- Sami Tenetz : Guitars, vocals, synths on tracks 8 & 9
- Luopio : Bass, synths on tracks 1, 3 & 5
- Agathon : Drums on tracks 2, 4 & 6, synths on track 7
- Azhemin : Backing vocals, synths on tracks 2, 4 & 6
