= Christcrusher =

Studio album by Thy Serpent
- Released: December 1998
- Recorded: 1998, Tico-Tico Studios, Kemi
- Genre: Black metal
- Length: 41:58
- Label: Spinefarm
- Producer: Thy Serpent

Thy Serpent chronology
Lords of Twilight (1997)	Christcrusher (1998)

Christcrusher is the third and final studio album by Finnish black metal band Thy Serpent. It is named after the sixth track on the album. It was recorded at Tico Tico Studios and features a more traditional black metal sound. Following its release in 1998, Christcrusher entered the Finnish Albums Chart, peaking at number 38 and remaining on the chart for two weeks.

== Track listing ==
1. Chambers of the Starwatcher 5:43
2. Curtain of Treachery 4:21
3. Thou Bade Nothingness 5:18
4. So Free Are the Wolves 6:53
5. Circle of Pain 5:21
6. Christcrusher 3:23
7. Crystalmoors 5:20
8. Calm Blinking 5:25

== Personnel ==
- Azhemin - Bass, Vocals, Synthesizers
- Sami Tenetz - Guitars, Vocals
- Agathon - Drums, Screaming
