= Cape York meteorite =

Very large iron meteorite from Greenland

Cape York
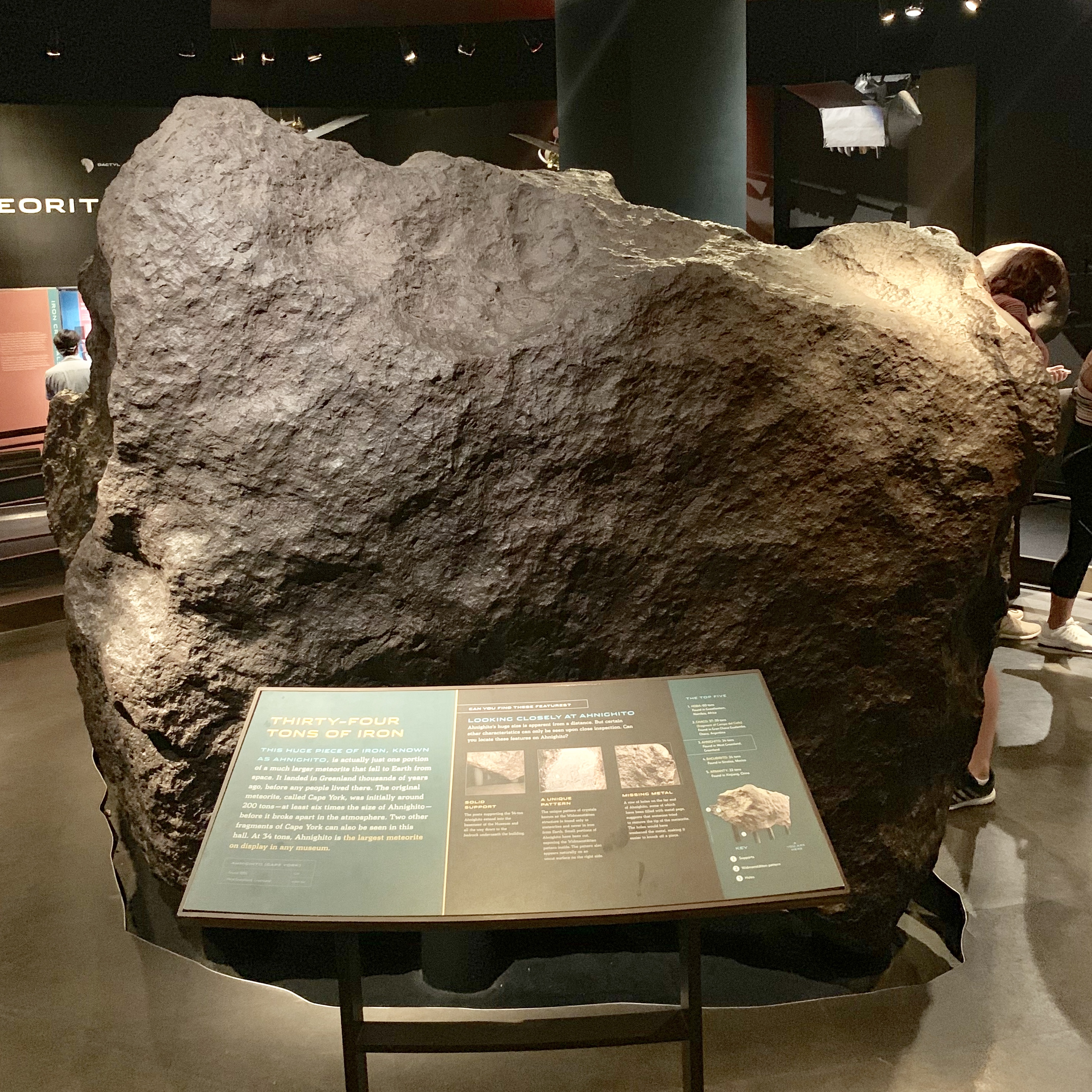
- The "Ahnighito" fragment in the American Museum of Natural History
- Type: Iron
- Structural classification: Medium octahedrite
- Group: IIIAB
- Composition: 7.84% Ni, 0.50% Co, 0.15% P, 0.02% C, 1.3% S, 19 ppm Ga, 36 ppm Ge, 5 ppm Ir
- Country: Greenland
- Region: Avannaata
- Coordinates: 76°08′N 64°56′W
- Fall date: A few thousand years ago
- Found date: About 1,000 years ago
- TKW: 58,200 kg (128,300 lb)
- Strewn field: Yes
- Related media on Wikimedia Commons

The Cape York meteorite, also known as the Innaanganeq meteorite, is one of the largest known iron meteorites, classified as a medium octahedrite in chemical group IIIAB. In addition to many small fragments, at least eight large fragments with a total mass of 58 tonnes (128,000 lb) have been recovered, the largest weighing 31 tonnes (68,000 lb). The meteorite was named after Cape York, a prominent geographic feature located approximately 48 kilometres (30 mi) west of the east coast of Meteorite Island and the nearby peninsulas in northern Melville Bay, Greenland, where the first meteorite fragments were discovered.

The date of the meteorite fall is debated, but was likely within the last few thousand years. A museum placard accompanying the Agpalilik fragment at the Natural History Museum of Denmark states that, it fell approximately 58 million years ago. This figure is inconsistent with the archaeological/historical estimate that the fall occurred within the last 1,000–10,000 years, and does not match published terrestrial-age estimates of 1–2 million years. The 58-million-year figure is roughly the same order of magnitude as Cape York's cosmic-ray exposure age of 93 ± 16 million years, suggesting the signage may conflate time spent in space as a meteoroid with time spent on Earth since the fall.

It was known to the Inughuit (the local Inuit) for centuries, who used it as a source of meteoritic iron for tools.

== History ==
Presumably the meteorite fell to Earth a few thousand years ago. Some estimates have put the date of the fall as 10,000 years ago. All fragments recovered were found at the surface, partly buried, some on unstable terrain. The largest fragment was recovered in an area where the landscape consists of "flowing" gravel or clay-like sediments on permafrost. There are mainly two hypotheses being discussed: the meteorites fell in an unknown place in Greenland, but were carried by glaciers to their current locations, or they fell directly to where they were found after the glaciers had retreated.

Presumably, no people saw the fall, although, based on legends told by locals to Western travelers, there are some dubious grounds to assume that the fall happened after the first people, known as the Dorset people, arrived in these places in the 7th and 8th century AD. Later Inuit referred to the known meteorite fragments under the general name Saviksue (Great Irons). The three most important fragments, according to the legend told to Robert Peary, were Inuk sewing woman (the Woman) with her tent (the Tent) and curled up dog (the Dog) who had been all hurled from heaven by the evil spirit Tornarsuk. For centuries, Inuit living near the meteorites used them as a source of metal for tools and harpoons. Inuit would work the metal using cold forging, that is, by hammering the metal with stones. Excavations of a medieval Norse farm in the modern day Nuuk area in 1976 revealed an arrowhead made of iron from the meteorite. Its presence is evidence of the connections between Greenland Norse and northern Greenland. Other pieces of Cape York meteoritic iron dating prior to 1450 (i.e. before the Little Ice Age) have been found throughout the Arctic Archipelago and on the North American mainland, and are evidence of an extensive Thule culture trade network which supplied iron to First Nations peoples prior to European contact.

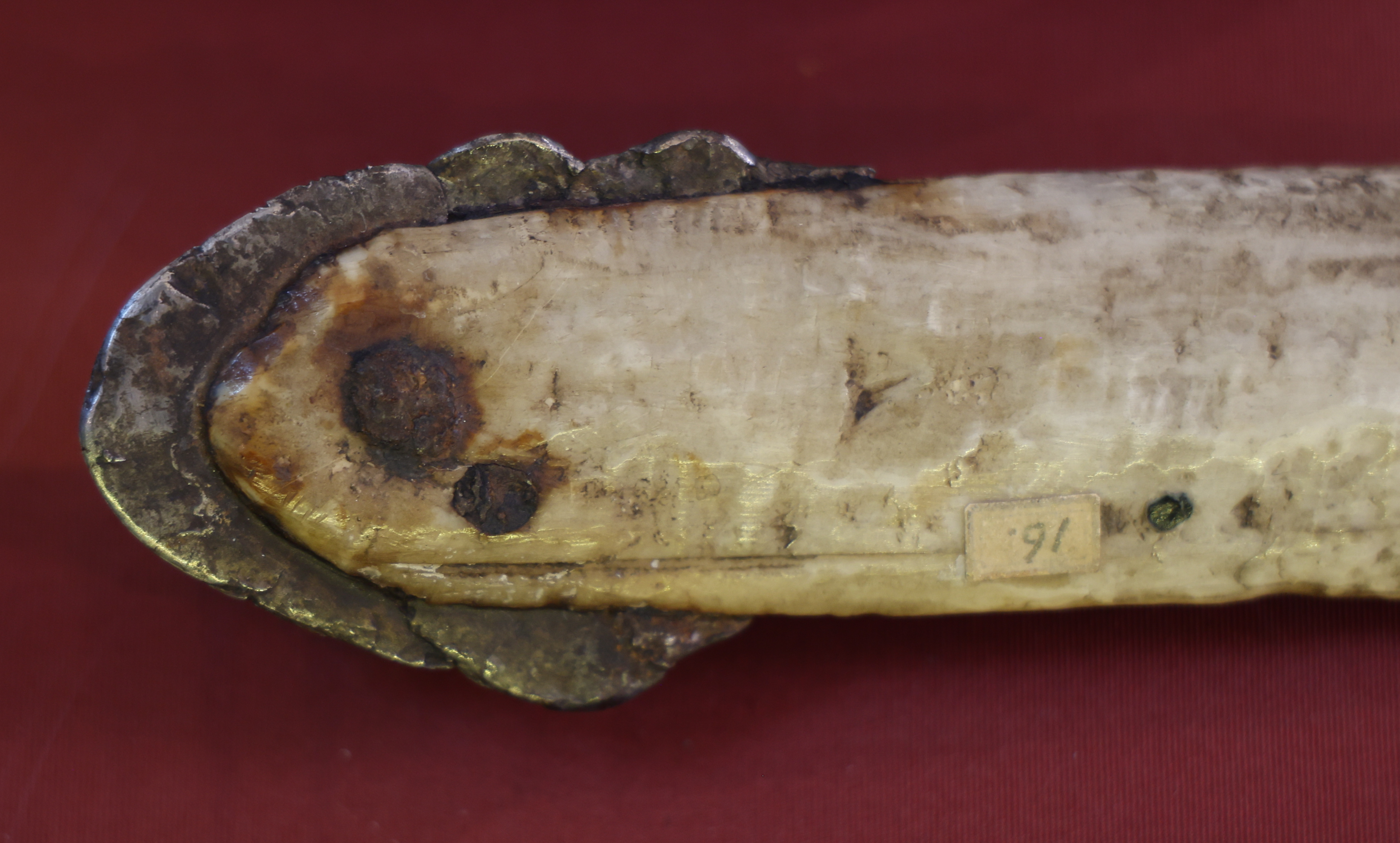
A lance made from a narwhal tusk with an iron head made from the Cape York meteorite

In 1818, the British First Ross Expedition (led by Captain John Ross) made contact with Inuit on the northern shore of Melville Bay, who stated they had settled in the area to exploit a nearby source of iron. Inuit loosely described the location of this iron as Sowallick (probably this refers to Savilik which in Greenlandic means 'with knife'), but poor weather and sea ice prevented Ross from investigating further. Ross correctly surmised that the large iron rocks described by Inuit were meteorites, and purchased several tools with blades made of the meteoritic iron.

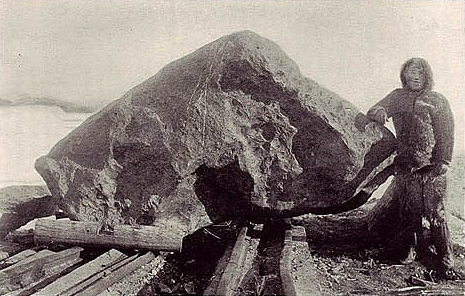
Peary with the Ahnighito fragment

Between 1818 and 1883, several further expeditions to the area were mounted by Britain, Sweden, and Denmark, which all failed to find the source of the meteoritic iron. Gradually, more and more iron objects were found on the west coast of Greenland. In 1870, Nordenskiöld located the main source of this iron at Ovifak (Uivfaq) on the south coast of Disko Island. But it soon became clear that this iron mass was of terrestrial origin. By the end of the century, the Sowallick irons had been discredited as meteorites.

Only in 1894 did a Western explorer reach the meteorite: Robert E. Peary, of the US Navy. Peary enlisted the help of a local Inuk guide, who brought him to the vicinity of the island now known as Meteorite Island. Peary dedicated three years to planning and executing the removal of the meteorite, a process which required, among other things, the construction of a short "railroad" of heavy timbers. In 1895 he managed to transport two smaller fragments (the Woman and the Dog). In 1897, after great effort, he managed to obtain the third and the largest fragment ("the Tent"). The name "Ahnighito" was given to the meteorite by Peary's daughter during a "baptizing" ceremony. Her middle name was Ahnighito, which is likely an anglophile version of the Inuk name Arnakitsoq (the name of the daughter's nanny). Peary sold this specimen for $40,000 (equivalent to $1.55 million in 2025) to the American Museum of Natural History in New York, where all three of the first discovered Cape York fragments are still on display. Ahnighito is 3.4 by 2.1 by 1.7 metres (11.2 ft × 6.9 ft × 5.6 ft) in size, the second heaviest meteorite known to date (after the Hoba meteorite in Namibia), and the heaviest meteorite to have been relocated. The supports of its display stand extend to the bedrock below the museum.

During his expedition to retrieve the meteorite, Peary convinced six Inughuit (Greenlandic Inuit) ("three men, one woman, a boy, and a girl"), including Minik Wallace, to travel with him in the United States for study at the American Museum of Natural History, where four died within a few months. Later Peary has received significant criticism for his treatment of Inuit.

A fourth large piece of the meteorite, 3.4-tonne (7,500 lb) Savik I, was discovered in 1913 on the promontory Saveqarfik, 10 km (6 mi) east of Woman-Dog location, but had evidently also been known to previous generations of Eskimos, since basaltic hammer stones were located around it. Due to World War I it was left at the scene of its discovery until 1923-24 when the mass was brought down from the top of the cliff to the seashore and transported across 25 km (16 mi) of sea ice to the Bushnan Island. Here, open water allowed the ship Sokongen to pick it up and sail with it to Copenhagen where it was unloaded in 1925 and thoroughly described.

Thule meteorite (Note: Originally considered as an individual meteorite, it began to be recognized as a fragment of the Cape York meteorite in the 1980s.) was found relatively close to Thule town and Thule Air Base in 1955 by a group of American glaciologists who surveyed the glacier flowing from Blue Ice Valley into the Moltke Glacier. The meteorite was resting as a boulder between gneissic boulders on a nunatak protruding through the glaciers which are heading for Wolstenholme Fjord. The meteorite has the shape and size of a resting goose, measuring 35 by 30 by 20 cm (13.8 by 11.8 by 7.9 in) in the greatest dimensions and weighing 48.6 kg (107 lb). Its distinctive feature is the "neck and head," a narrow extension of the massive meteorite, measuring about 10 by 3 by 10 cm (3.9 by 1.2 by 3.9 in). It appears that it was formed by fragmentation and sculpturing during the atmospheric flight.

After the local people had been encouraged to report any unusual boulder in the Cape York area, in 1961 a small, complete mass of 7.8 kg (17 lb), Savik II, was discovered at the coast 1 km (1,100 yd) east of the site of Savik I. It was found between gneissic boulders at the foot of a cliff by the Eskimo Augo Suerssaq while on a hunting trip.

In 1963, a fifth major piece of the Cape York meteorite was discovered by Vagn Buchwald on Agpalilik peninsula. The Agpalilik meteorite, also known as the Man, weighs about 20 tonnes (44,000 lb), and it is currently on display in the Geological Museum of the University of Copenhagen, Denmark.

Tunorput mass was found in September 1984 by Jeremias Petersen, a hunter from the settlement Savigsivik, on the east coast of the Meteorite island near the Ahnighito mass original location (Note: Information about the location of the find was taken from the map in Appelt's 2015 report.). It is probably the first meteorite ever to be found in the ocean. It was lying very close to the shore, and was exposed at low tide. Surveys of the area with a magnetometer in 2012 and georadar in 2014 found no evidence of further large iron fragments on Meteorite island, either buried or on the surface.

Numerous other small meteorite fragments have been found over the past century, as well as a variety of meteoritic iron artifacts. Most of the finds are not precisely coordinated and are not particularly useful for determining the expected meteorite strewn field, but they do reflect the important role that the Cape York meteorite once played as a major source of iron for local people.

== Specimens ==
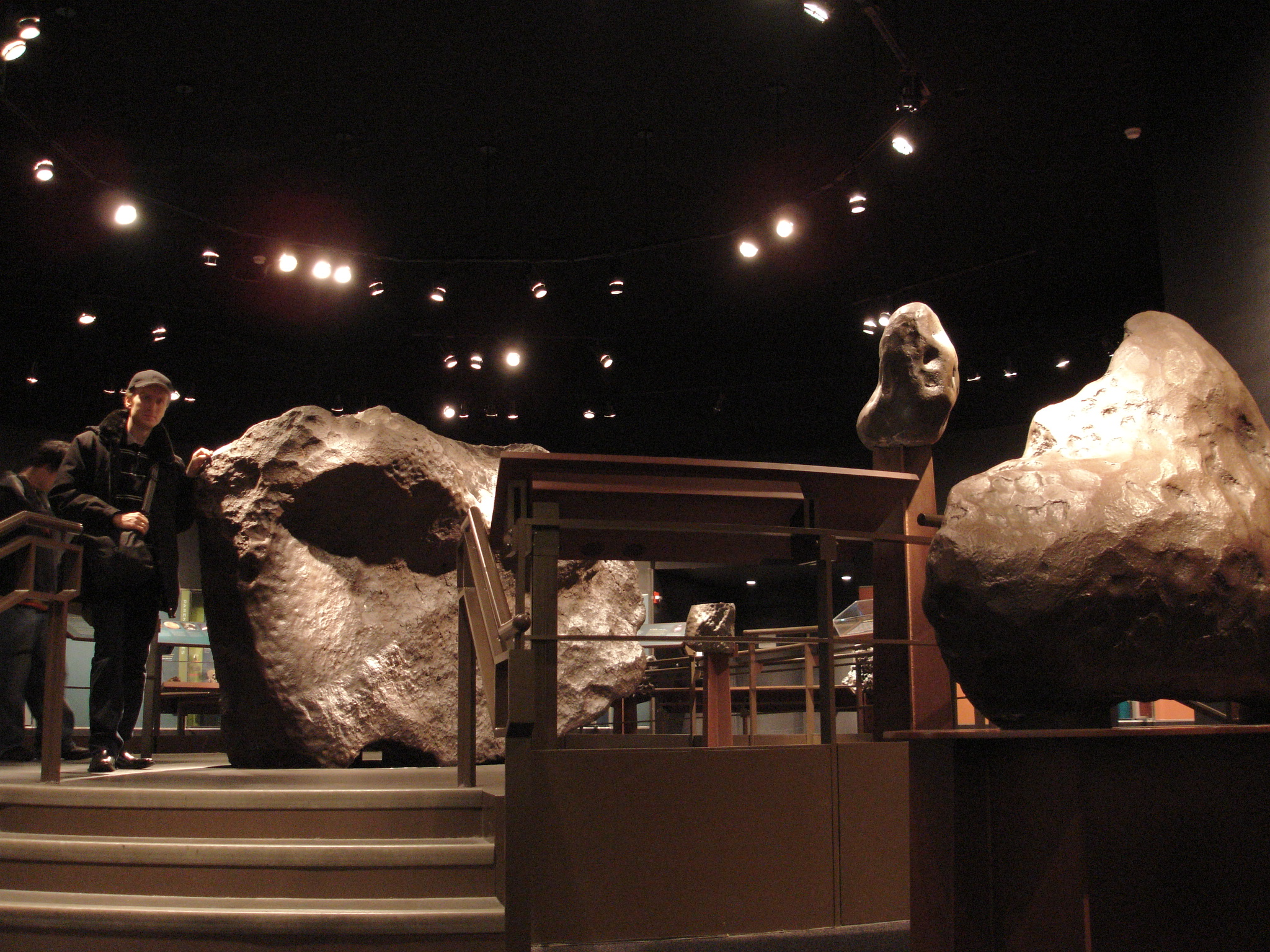
Hall in the American Museum of Natural History with the first three fragments of the Cape York meteorite

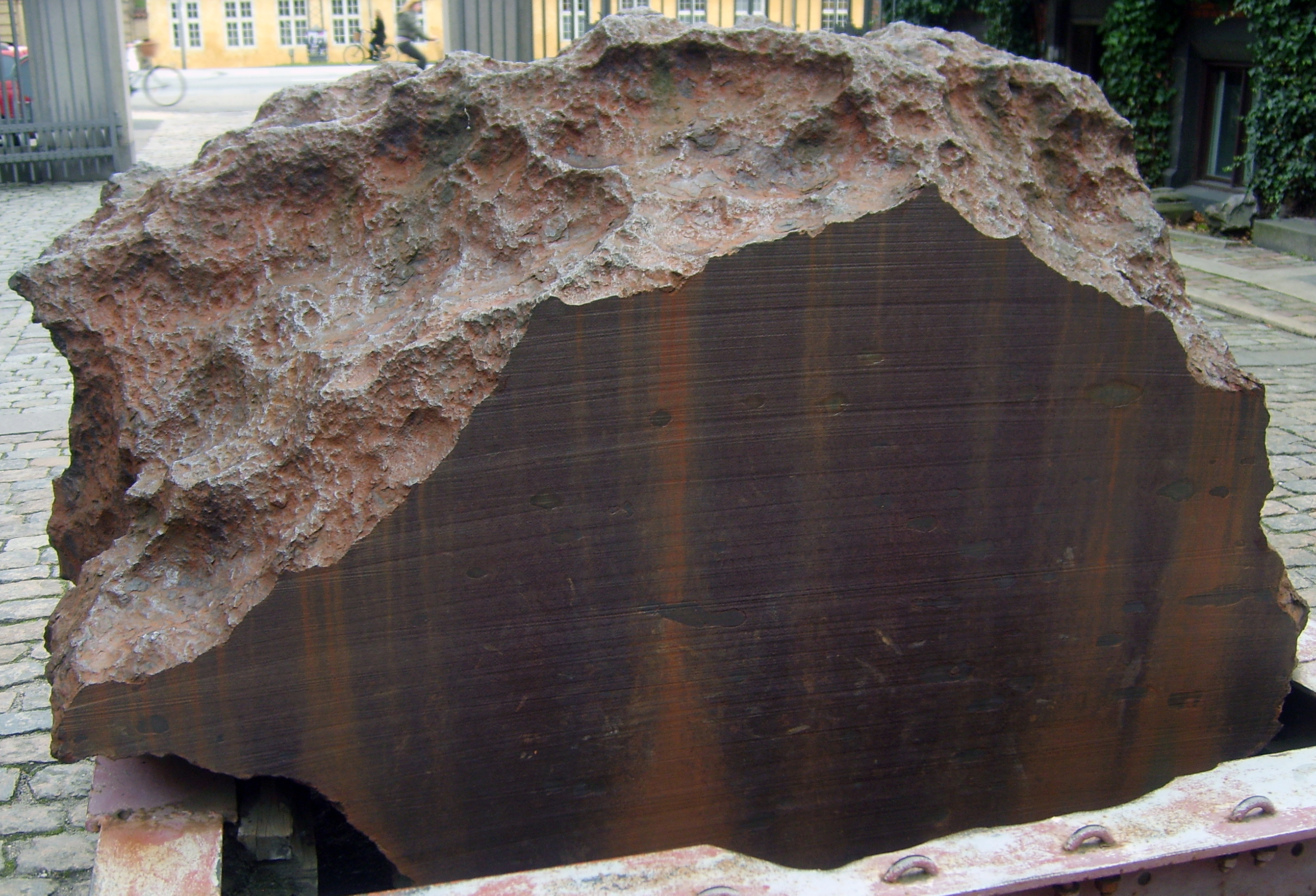
Agpalilik outside the Geological Museum in Copenhagen

Known confirmed masses of Cape York meteorite
Mass name	Year of discovery	Latitude (N)	Longitude (W)	Location	Mass, kg
Ahnighito (the Tent)	1894 (Note: It is common to see erroneous values for the discovery year of the first three fragments. In particular, the typo in the discovery year has not yet been corrected in the Meteoritical Bulletin Database.)	76°03′35″	64°55′20″	76°03′35″N 64°55′20″W	30,880
Woman	1894	76°08′16″	64°56′15″	76°08′16″N 64°56′15″W	3,000
Dog	1894	76°08′15″	64°56′14″	76°08′15″N 64°56′14″W	407
Savik I	1913	76°08′	64°36′	76°08′N 64°36′W	3,402
Thule	1955	76°32′	67°33′	76°32′N 67°33′W	48.6
Savik II	1961	76°08′	64°35′	76°08′N 64°35′W	7.8
Agpalilik (the Man)	1963	76°09′	65°10′	76°09′N 65°10′W	20,140
Tunorput	1984	76°04′	64°57′	76°04′N 64°57′W (Note: Since there are no publicly available coordinates for the original location of the Turnoprit meteorite, the coordinates of the corresponding point marked on the map in Appelt's 2015 report were calculated.)	250
Total:					58,135.4

== Composition and classification ==
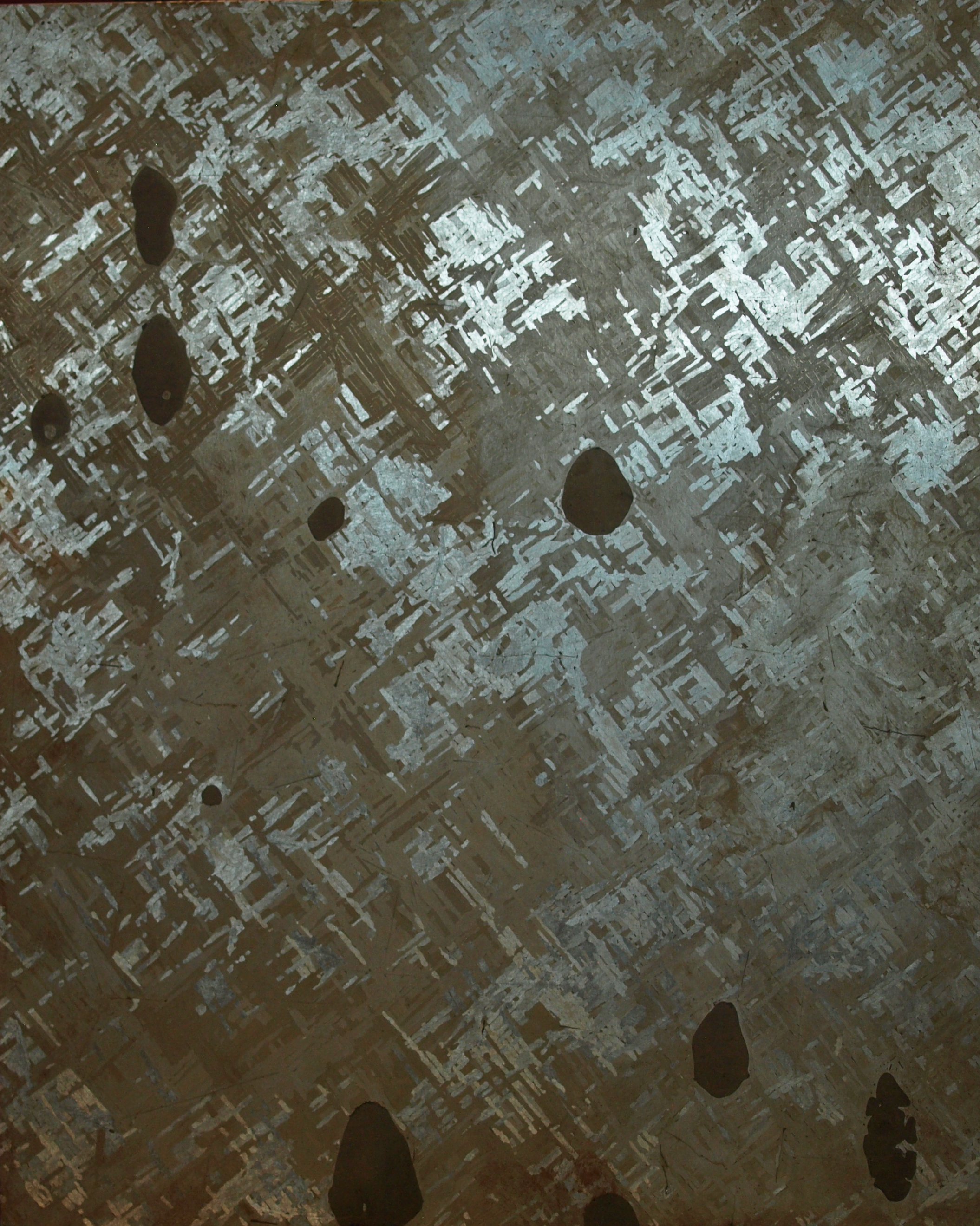
Widmanstätten pattern of a fragment of the Cape York meteorite

It is an iron meteorite (medium octahedrite) and belongs to the chemical group IIIAB. The main distinguishing feature of meteoric iron is the high nickel content in its composition. There are abundant elongated troilite nodules. The troilite nodules contain inclusions of chromite, sulfides, phosphates, silica and copper. The rare nitride mineral carlsbergite (CrN) occurs within the matrix of the metal phase. Graphite was not observed and the nitrogen isotopes are in disequilibrium.

== In popular culture ==
- In the manga and anime series JoJo's Bizarre Adventure, the Diamond is Unbreakable and Golden Wind story arcs prominently feature a set of six arrows which are made out of meteoric iron sourced from the Cape York meteorite.

== See also ==
- Glossary of meteoritics
- History of ferrous metallurgy
- List of largest meteorites on Earth
- Archaeometallurgy
- Inuit culture
- Meteoric iron

== Bibliography ==
- Buchwald, Vagn F. (1975a). Handbook of Iron Meteorites. Their History, Distribution, Composition and Structure. Vol. 2: Iron Meteorites: Abakan - Mejillones. University of California Press. ISBN 0-520-02934-8.
- Buchwald, Vagn F. (1975b). Handbook of Iron Meteorites. Their History, Distribution, Composition and Structure. Vol. 3: Iron Meteorites: Merceditas - Zerhamra. Supplement. University of California Press. ISBN 0-520-02934-8.
- Appelt, Martin; Jensen, Jens Fog; Myrup, Mikkel; Haack, Henning; Sørensen, Mikkel; Taube, Michelle (2015). The Cultural History of the Innaanganeq/Cape York Meteorite (PDF) (Report). The Greenland National Museum & Archives.
- Peary, Robert E. (1898). Northward over the "Great Ice". Vol. II. New York: Frederick A. Stokes Company.
- Dick, Lyle (2001). Muskox Land: Ellesmere Island in the Age of Contact. University of Calgary Press. ISBN 978-1-55238-050-5.
- Huntington, Patricia A. M. (2002). "Robert E. Peary and the Cape York Meteorites" (PDF). Polar Geography. 26 (1): 53–65. Bibcode:2002PolGe..26...53H. doi:10.1080/789609353.
