= Mowry Baden =

American sculptor (born 1936)

- Born: Mowry Thacher Baden; January 17, 1936 (age 90); Los Angeles, California
- Occupation: Artist
- Known for: Sculpture
- Awards: Guggenheim Fellowship; Governor General's Award in Visual and Media Arts

Mowry Thacher Baden (born January 17, 1936) is an American sculptor who has lived and worked in Canada since 1975. He is known for his gallery-based kinaesthetic sculptures and for his public sculpture, both of which require a strong element of bodily interaction on the part of the viewer.

== Life ==
Baden was born January 17, 1936, in Los Angeles, California, to Frank Baden and Jane Louise Thacher.

A 1954 graduate of Redondo Union High School in Redondo Beach, California, Baden studied at Pomona College (BA, 1958) and Stanford University (MFA, 1965). He has practiced sculpture for nearly 50 years and has taught sculpture at Raymond College, Pomona College, UBC, and the University of Victoria, from which he retired in 1997. Artist Chris Burden was one of his students.

In 1958, he married Gretchen Fosburgh Kaiser, granddaughter of industrialist Henry J. Kaiser. They divorced in 1973.

He is married to actor-director-writer Judith McDowell. He lives in Victoria, British Columbia, where he continues to produce sculpture and public art.

== Art practice ==
Baden is known for his sculptures that allow the viewer to generate kinaesthetic experiences. To this end, his gallery-based works often use mechanisms or physical components that encourage viewer interaction.

== Public artworks ==
- Pavilion, Rock and Shell, 2005, Victoria, BC, Canada
- Fulcrum of Vision, 2003, Vancouver, BC
- The Wall of Death, 1993 (with Colin Baden), Seattle, Washington
- Silage Beach, The Exploratorium, San Francisco, CA
- Washington Project for the Arts, Washington, DC
- Justin Herman Plaza, San Francisco, CA
- Artpark, Lewiston, NY (with Michael Brewster)
- University of California

== Exhibitions ==
Baden's exhibitions include:

- Galeria Excelsior, Mexico City (1957)
- Galleria Pogliani, Rome (1959)
- Museum of Modern Art, New York (1960)
- Cobar Gallery, New York (1962)
- University of Mexico, Mexico City (1963)
- San Francisco Art Institute, San Francisco (1968)
- The Vancouver Art Gallery, Vancouver (1972,1979 and a retrospective in 2019)
- Otis Art Institute, Los Angeles (1975)
- National Gallery of Canada, (2008)
- Benjamin Diaz Gallery, Toronto (2007 and 2009)
- Vancouver Art Gallery, Vancouver (2019)

== Awards ==
In 2006, Baden was awarded a Governor General's Award in Visual and Media Arts. In 2015, he was the recipient of a Guggenheim fellowship.

== Teaching practice ==
Baden taught at the University of the Pacific (Stockton, CA) and Pomona College at the Claremont Graduate University. In 1971, he left California for Canada. There, he taught at the University of British Columbia's Vancouver campus followed by a tenured position at the University of Victoria in Victoria, British Columbia from 1975 to 1997. Among his past students are several important contemporary artists, including Chris Burden, James Carl, Catherine MacLean, Barbara Fischer, Bill Burns, Lewis Baltz, Jessica Stockholder and Kim Adams.

== Collections ==
Baden's work is included in the collection of the National Gallery of Canada, the Museum of Contemporary Art San Diego, the Pomona College Museum of Art, the Vancouver Art Gallery, the Musée d'art contemporain de Montréal, [[the Oakland Art Museum, Oakland CA, the University of California, Berkeley CA, the Glenbow Art Museum, Calgary AB, the Art Gallery of Ontario, Toronto, the Museum of Contemporary Art, Los Angeles, the Science Center, Lubbock TX, the Art Bank, Canada Council, Ottawa, the Washington Project for the Arts, Washington, DC, the Exploratorium, San Francisco, the Addison Gallery, Andover MA, University of California, Santa Barbara, the American Psychological Association, Washington DC]].
