= Meteorite Island =

Island in Baffin Bay

Native name: Savigsivik Meteorit Ø (Danish)
- Location within Greenland

Geography
- Location: Baffin Bay, Greenland
- Coordinates: 76.0197°N 65.1149°W

Administration
- Greenland
- Municipality: Avannaata

Demographics
- Population: uninhabited

Meteorite Island (Danish: Meteorit Ø) is an island in Baffin Bay, in Avannaata municipality, off NW Greenland.

The Cape York Meteorite fell thousands of years ago on the southern shore of this island.

== Geography ==
Meteorite Island is quite barren and desolate. It lies off the shore of Meteor Bay and is the largest of the group part of a small chain of coastal islands formed by Meteorite Island, Salve Island, George Island, Bushnan Island and a small islet. This chain of islands is located between Cape York and Cape Melville.

The Inuit village of Savissivik is located at the southwestern end of Meteorite Island. The settlement has a heliport, Savissivik Heliport and in 2010 it had 66 inhabitants. In the Greenlandic language, the name of the settlement Savissivik means 'place of meteorite iron' (savik = iron/knife), alluding to the numerous meteorites from 10,000 years ago that have been found in the area. The Cape York meteorite is estimated to have weighed 100 tonnes before it exploded. The iron from the meteorite attracted migrating Inuit from Arctic Canada.

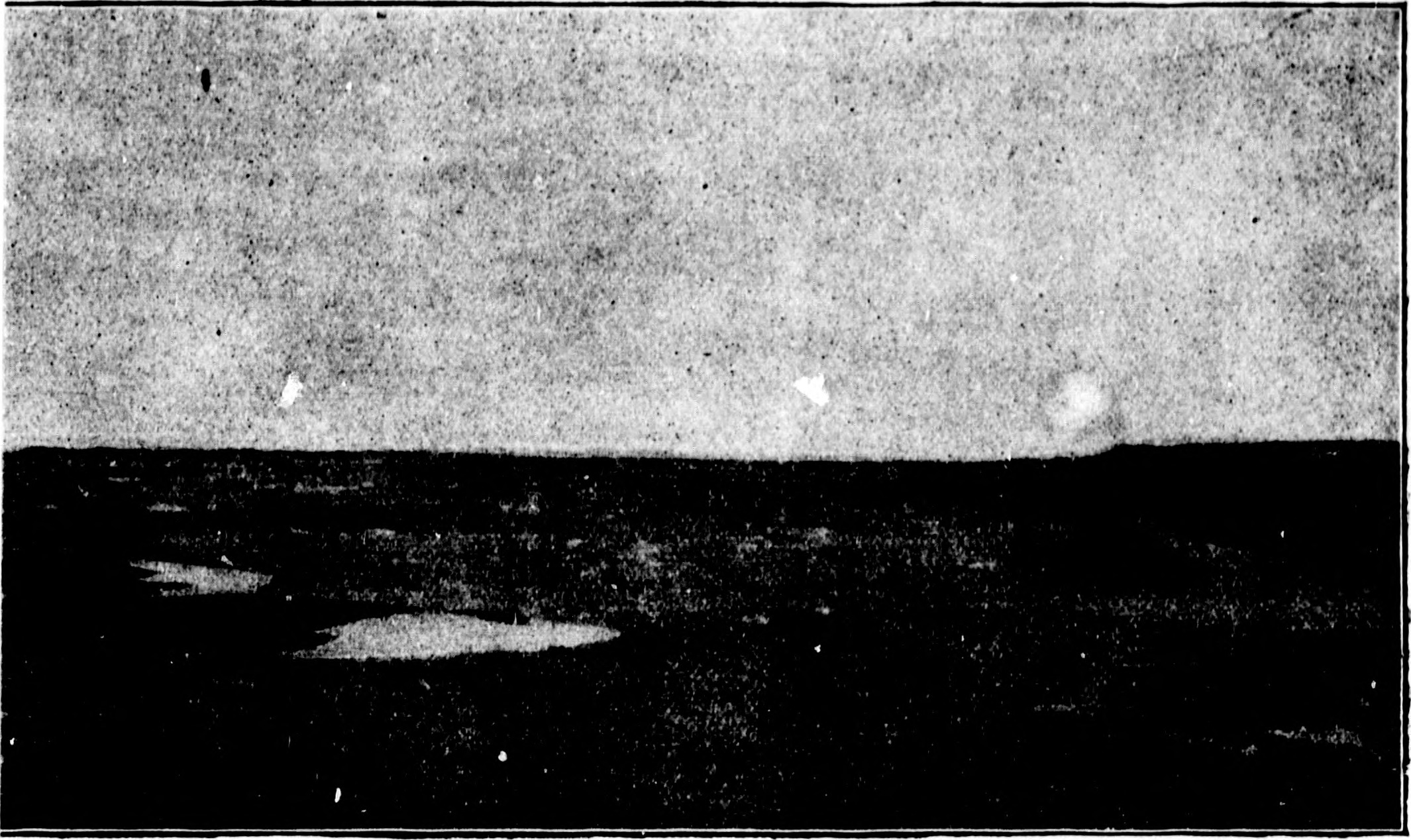
19th century photograph of Meteorite Island

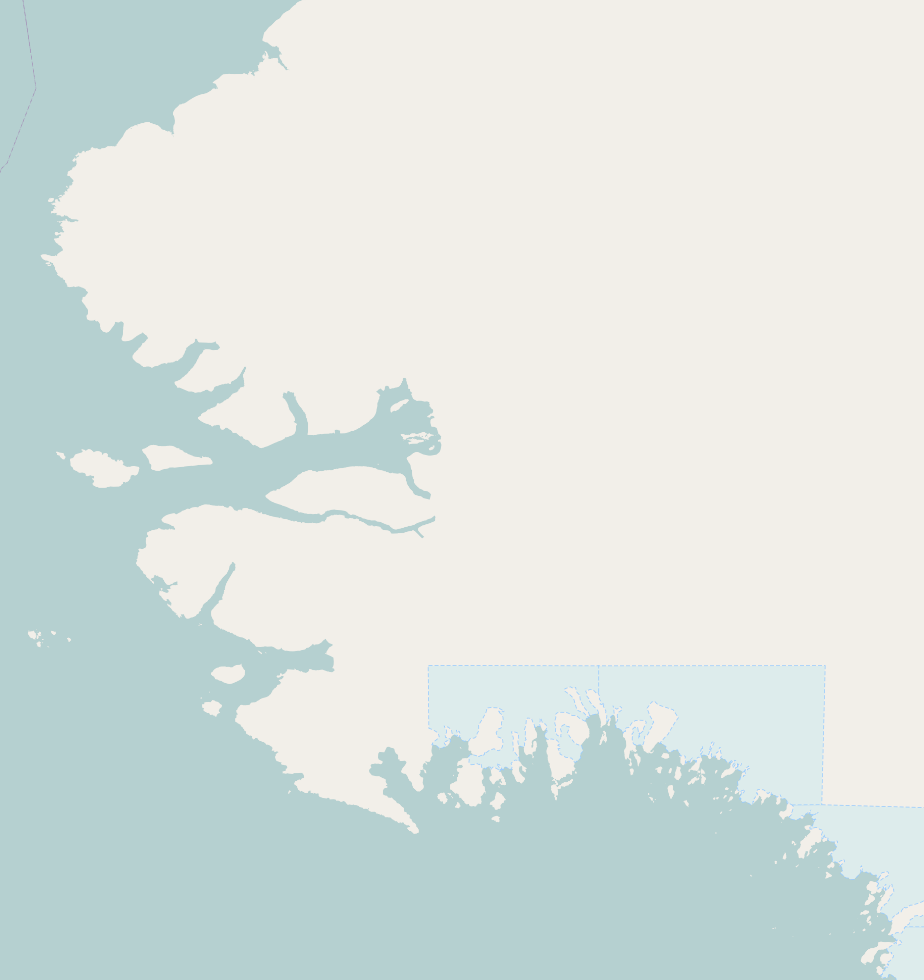
Location of Meteorite Island

== See also ==
- List of islands of Greenland
