= Thy Serpent =

Finnish black metal band

- Origin: Espoo, Finland
- Genre: Black metal
- Years active: 1995–present
- Label: Kvlt
- Members: Sami Tenetz; Marko Tarvonen; Luopio; Miika Niemelä

Thy Serpent is a Finnish black metal band from Espoo. It started out as a solo project by Sami Tenetz in 1992. A full lineup was acquired in 1995.

== History ==
After two demos, he signed a record deal with Spinefarm Records. Azhemin, Agathon, and Luopio joined between 1995 and 1996 when they released their debut, Forests of Witchery. "Only Dust Moves" was featured on the Nightwish single "The Carpenter". After their debut album's success, their international debut, Christcrusher, followed.

Contrary to their statements that they would never play live, they did eight gigs in Finland in the summer of 1999. In 2000, Thy Serpent changed its line-up, adding a second guitarist and a new drummer. During that year, they went to the studio to record Death, which remains the last record by the band. They are now signed to Candlelight Records.

== Band members ==
- Azhemin - Vocals / Bass / Synth
- Sami Tenetz - Guitar
- Teemu Laitinen - Drums
- Tomi Ullgren - Lead Guitar

=== Former members ===
- Pekka - Drums (1995)
- Börje - Guitar (1995)
- Teemu Raimoranta - Guitar (1995-1996; died 2003)
- Alexi Laiho - Guitar (1997; died 2020)
- Agathon - Drums/ Vocals (1996-1999; died 2022)
- Luopio - Bass/ Vocals (1996-1998)

== Discography ==
- Frozen Memory Demo (1994)
- Into Everlasting Fire Demo (1995)
- Forests of Witchery (1996)
- Lords of Twilight (MCD) (1997)
- Christcrusher (1998)
- Death (2000)
- Wolfnacht / Goatmoon / Thy Serpent (split, 2022)
