= Forests of Witchery =

1996 studio album by Thy Serpent

Studio album by Thy Serpent
- Released: 30 September 1996
- Genre: Symphonic black metal
- Length: 48:19
- Label: Spinefarm Records

Thy Serpent chronology
Forests of Witchery (1996)	Lords of Twilight (1997)

Professional ratings
Review scores
Source	Rating
Metal Crypt	3.75/5 stars

Forests of Witchery is the debut album by Finnish symphonic black metal band Thy Serpent, released on 30 September 1996. It has a more doom/gothic feel than later albums. It was the band's first collaborative work; the previously released demos were created solely by Sami Tenetz, who currently is rhythm guitarist of the band.

The track Only Dust Moves... was featured on Finnish symphonic metal band Nightwish's debut single "The Carpenter".

== Track listing ==
No.	Title	Length
1.	"Flowers of Witchery Abloom"	6:12
2.	"Of Darkness and Light"	4:52
3.	"A Traveller of Unknown Plains"	9:41
4.	"Only Dust Moves..."	7:10
5.	"Like a Funeral Veil of Melancholy"	11:27
6.	"Wine from Tears"	8:48
Total length:		48:10

== Credits ==
- All music by Thy Serpent
- All lyrics by Antti Litmanen except "A Traveller of Unknown Plains" by Myst
- Engineered by Ahti Kortelainen
- Sami – guitars
- Luopio – bass, backing vocals
- Azhemin – synthesizer, vocals
- Agathon – drums
