= De Dodes Fjord =

Fjord in northwestern Greenland

- De Dødes Fjord
- Location in Greenland
- Location: Arctic
- Coordinates: 76°7′N 66°46′W
- Ocean/sea sources: Melville Bay
- Basin countries: Greenland
- Max. length: 28 km (17 mi)
- Max. width: 7.5 km (4.7 mi)

De Dodes Fjord (Danish: De Dødes Fjord, meaning "The Fjord of the Dead") is a fjord in northwestern Greenland. Administratively it belongs to the Avannaata municipality.

== Geography ==
De Dodes Fjord opens to the south, east of the Crimson Cliffs in the Cape York area, close to the cape itself. It runs roughly in a NW/SE direction for less than 30 km (19 mi) and has a few small coves or recesses along its shore. Salve Island is located to the east of its mouth. Sidebriksfjord is located next to it to the east, separated from it by a promontory. The fjord is bordered on both sides by glaciated plateaux.

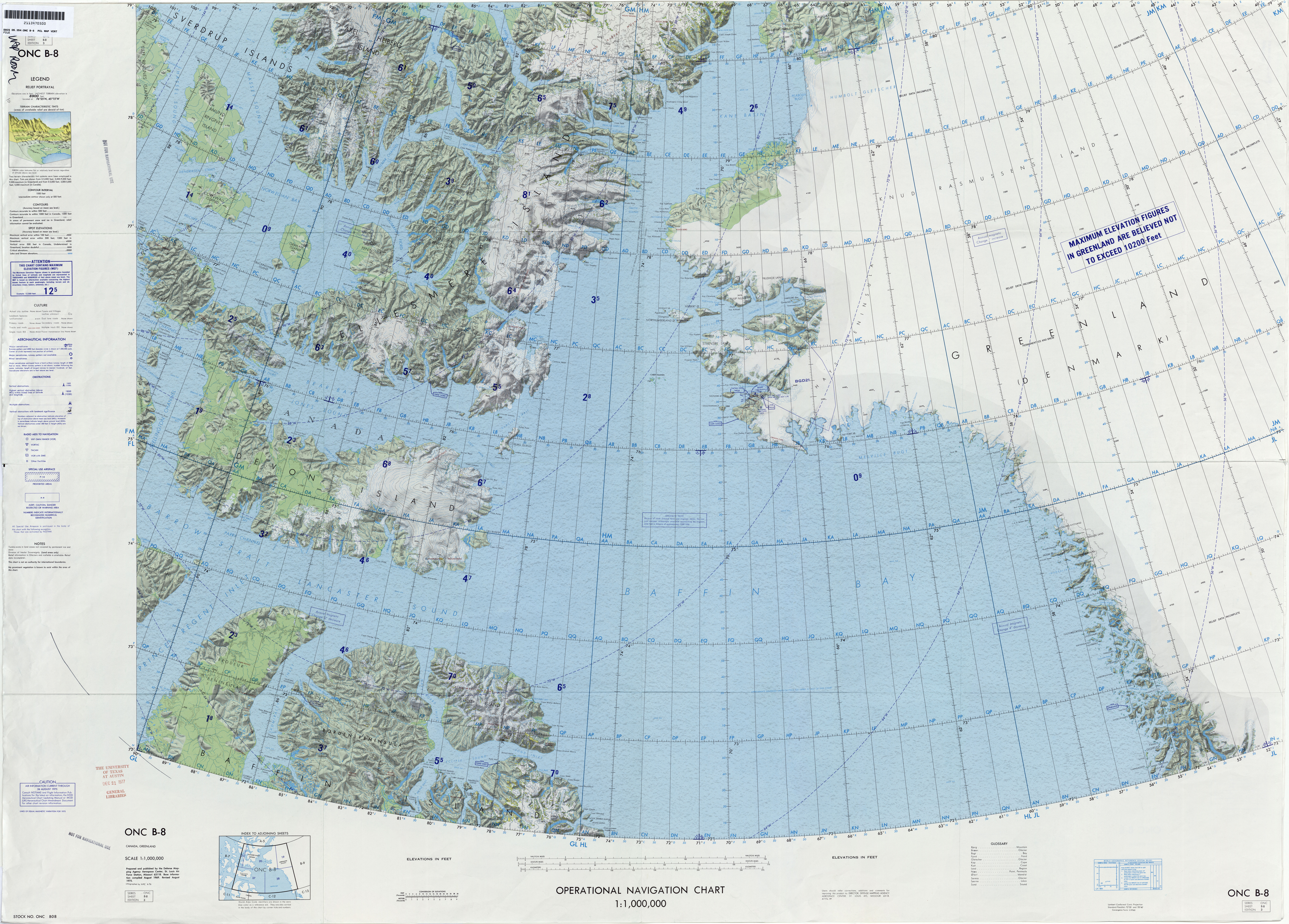
Map of Northwestern Greenland

== See also ==
- List of fjords of Greenland
