= The Carpenter (Nightwish song) =

1997 single by Nightwish

Single by Nightwish

from the album Angels Fall First
- Released: 29 September 1997
- Studio: Huvikeskus, Kitee, Finland
- Length: 5:55
- Label: Spinefarm
- Composer: Nightwish
- Lyricist: Tuomas Holopainen
- Producers: Tuomas Holopainen; Nightwish

Nightwish singles chronology
| "The Carpenter" (1997) | "Sacrament of Wilderness" (1998) |

Music video
- "The Carpenter" on YouTube

"The Carpenter" is the debut single by the Finnish symphonic metal band Nightwish, the only from their debut album, Angels Fall First. This is the only Nightwish single to feature lead vocals by both Tarja Turunen and Tuomas Holopainen. The single debuted at #8 in the Finnish single chart, but peaked at #3 in the end of 1997. It was performed live for the first time in over twenty years with Floor Jansen and Troy Donockley in 2018 during the Decades: World Tour.

== Christian symbolism ==
The eponymous "carpenter" referred to in the lyrics is Jesus of Nazareth, who is said to have "carved his anchor on the dying souls of mankind". The tomb of the unknown soldier refers to the centurion Saint Longinus who acknowledged the dying Jesus as the Son of God and converted to Christianity before dying a martyr's death at the hands of Tiberius. The song seems to be sung from the perspective of Saint Veronica, Mary Magdalene, or the Virgin Mary as she "lay on the grass and observed her saviour" in his final moments.

== Track listing ==
| No. | Title | Writer(s) | Length |
|---|---|---|---|
| 1. | "The Carpenter" | Tuomas Holopainen | 5:55 |
| 2. | "Red Light In My Eyes, Part II" (Children of Bodom) | Alexi Laiho | 3:50 |
| 3. | "Only Dust Moves..." (Thy Serpent) | Antti Litmanen | 7:09 |

== Personnel ==
Nightwish

- Tarja Turunen – vocals
- Tuomas Holopainen – keyboards, vocals
- Emppu Vuorinen – guitars, bass guitar
- Jukka Nevalainen – drums

Children of Bodom

- Alexi Laiho – lead guitar, vocals
- Alexander Kuoppala – rhythm guitar
- Henkka Seppälä – bass
- Janne Wirman – keyboards
- Jaska Raatikainen – drums

Thy Serpent

- Sami Tenetz – guitars
- Luopio – bass, backing vocals
- Azhemin – vocals, keyboards
- Agathon – drums

== Music video ==
The music video features vocalist Tarja Turunen in a red dress on a field while a carpenter (implied to be Leonardo da Vinci) designs a flying machine at his workshop. There are many references to the crucifixion including candles, an underground workshop representing the tomb and the sign of the cross. When the man fastens on the glider, he spreads out his arms in a similar way to the crucified Christ.

The video was filmed in Helsinki, Finland and in Henningsvær, Norway during spring 1998. There were shot scenes of the rest of the band playing (including Tuomas Holopainen singing, Emppu Vuorinen on acoustic and electric guitars, and Jukka Nevalainen on drums), but the director, Sami Käyhkö, and Holopainen did not like it, so they only included Turunen.

=== Cast ===
- The carpenter: Vilho Olavi Laine
- The cat: Ms Maila
