= The Wall of Death =

Public artwork in Seattle, Washington, U.S.

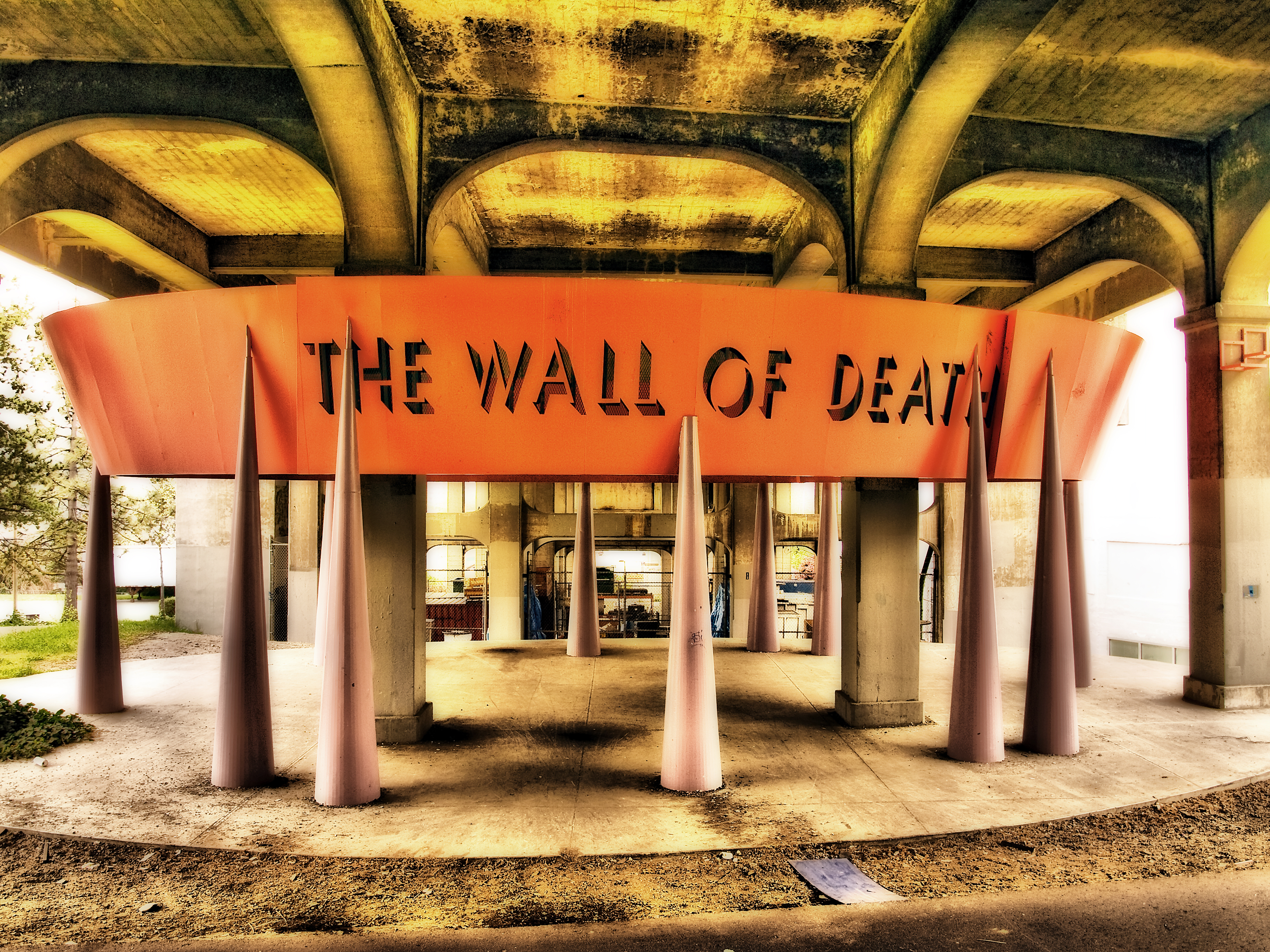
- Artist: Mowry Baden; Colin Baden
- Completion date: c. 1993
- Type: Sculpture
- Medium: Concrete, steel and aluminum
- Subject: Vehicles as recreation
- Dimensions: 490 cm × 2,000 cm × 910 cm (16 ft × 65 ft × 30 ft); 3,658 m^{2}
- Location: Seattle, Washington, United States; 47.6552°N 122.3185°W
- Owner: Seattle Department of Transportation

The Wall of Death is a permanently sited public art installation located under the University Bridge in Seattle, alongside the Burke-Gilman Trail and NE 40th Street in the University District. It was designed and built by Mowry Baden and his son, Colin, in 1993.

The installation is a representation of the structure used to perform the motorcycle and miniature automobile stunt, the wall of death. It includes the cylinder itself on the south side of the Burke-Gilman Trail, as well as a concrete ramp to the north of the trail, which includes a "series of stylized metal chairs mounted to the existing concrete bridge columns" and serves as the stands from which the stunts were viewed.

The ramp provided a spot for skateboarders to ride, but after seven complaints and a head-on collision between a skateboarder and a cyclist in 2008, The Seattle Department of Transportation installed a rock barrier to deter skateboarders from interacting with the art. Although Mowry Baden had intended the installation to be used by skateboarders, he agreed that public safety was more important and met with the city in December 2008, to discuss updating it. Twenty-five concrete parking stops were then added to the sculpture, making it impossible to skate on.

== Reception ==
The location was said by Seattle Weekly to tie with the Fremont Troll for the worst site for public art in Seattle.

Citizens have called the piece "sinister, whimsical, and tacky". The piece was listed by Portland's daily newspaper, The Oregonian, as a must-see Seattle landmark.

On Nov 15, 2020, a fire started by a grill from a homeless tent heavily damaged the artwork. About five tents caught fire causing multiple small explosions from propane tanks
