= Morituri =

Morituri—Latin for "those who are about to die"—can refer to:

- Morituri (1948 film), a German film, featuring Klaus Kinski's onscreen debut.
- Morituri (1965 film), starring Marlon Brando and Yul Brynner.
- Morituri (2007 film), a 2007 French-Algerian film by Okacha Touita, from the homonymous book by Yasmina Khadra
- Strikeforce: Morituri, a Marvel Comics comic book series
- Those About to Die, a 2024 TV series starring Anthony Hopkins and Dimitri Leonidas

== See also ==
- Morituris, a 2011 Italian horror film
- Ave Imperator, morituri te salutant, a latin phrase
