= Natural History Museum of Denmark =

- Statens Naturhistoriske Museum
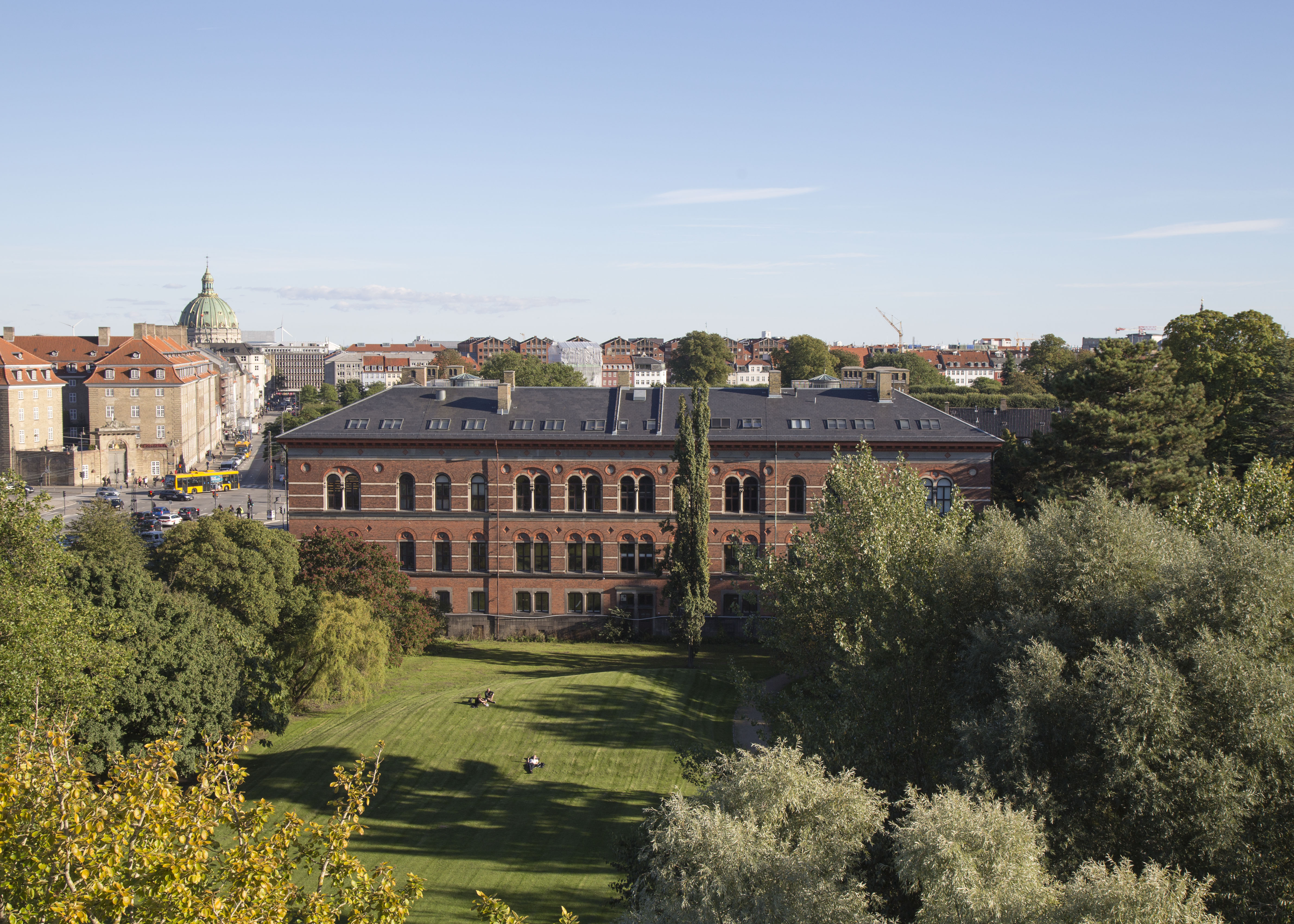
- Natural History Museum, Geological Museum Building
- Established: 2004
- Location: Gothersgade 130, 1123 Copenhagen, Denmark
- Coordinates: 55.685327°N 12.572781°E
- Type: Natural History Museum
- Director: Nina Rønsted
- Website: snm.ku.dk

The Natural History Museum of Denmark (Danish: Statens Naturhistoriske Museum) is a natural history museum located in Copenhagen, Denmark. It is affiliated with the University of Copenhagen.

The museum became an organizational entity in 2004 with the merger of Copenhagen's Zoological Museum, Geological Museum, Botanical Museum and Central Library, and Botanical Gardens (Zoological Museum, Geological Museum, Botanical Museum and Botanical Garden). The collections of the Natural History Museum Denmark belong to the Danish state and the museum has the responsibility, under the Museum Act, for managing the collections and associated research and dissemination.

The Natural History Museum Denmark has exhibitions at its main address on Øster Voldgade 5-7. In addition, the museum holds lectures, guided tours and events that focus on the collections, the Botanical Garden and the researchers' current research. The museum has a school service that offers teaching to students.

On March 6th 2027, the museum will open a new building in the Botanical Garden in Copenhagen. The new museum building is designed by Lundgaard & Tranberg Architects and architect Claus Pryds. The economy behind the project is based on a collaboration between the University of Copenhagen, the state and a number of private foundations; Villum Fonden, Aage og Johanne Louis-Hansens Fond, Novo Nordisk Fonden, Det Obelske Familie and A. P. Møller og Hustru Chastine Mc-Kinney Møllers Fond til almene Formaal.[4]

== History ==
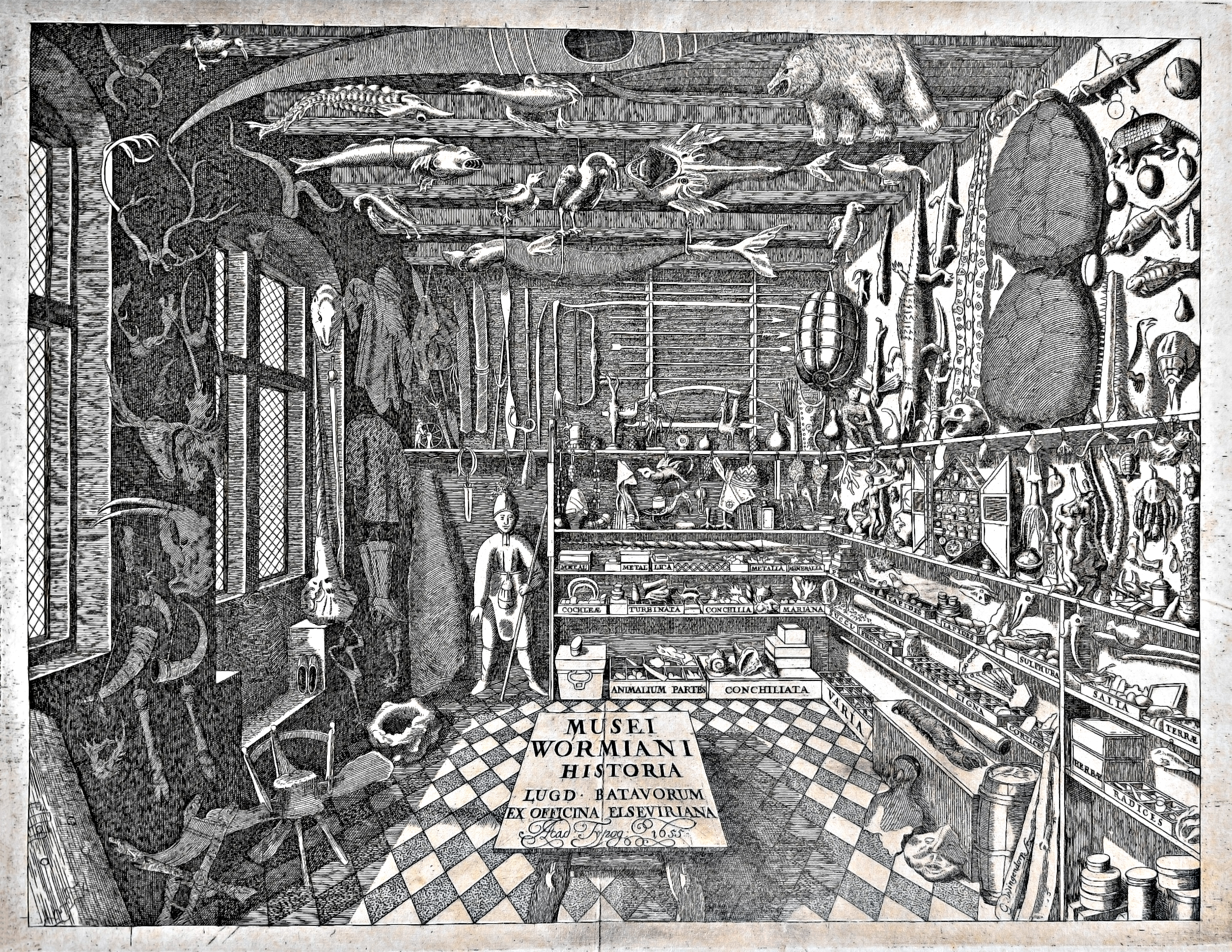
The famous frontispiece from Ole Worm's book Museum Wormianum from 1655

The Natural History Museum Denmark was established on 1 January 2004 by the merging of four long-standing institutions: the Botanical Garden, the Botanical Museum & Central Library, the Geological Museum, and the Zoological Museum. In 2020, the combined entity was officially renamed the Natural History Museum of Denmark, effectively becoming a single museum. Whereas the locations of the Botanical Gardens and the adjacent Geological Museum have been maintained, the Zoological Museum was located separately in the Universitetsparken. This museum location closed in 2022 and will be relocated to the new and larger Natural History Museum in the northeast corner of the Botanical Gardens. The complex is expected to open in the Fall of 2026. While the separate Zoological Museum has closed, its research and storage facilities at its old location have been maintained.

The history of the individual departments, which now are part of the united Natural History Museum of Denmark, can be traced back to the 17th century. One historical figure in particular played a crucial role in the creation of the Danish national heritage, namely Ole Worm (1588–1654). His cabinet of natural curiosities, the Museum Wormianum, formed together with the Royal Danish Cabinet of Curiosities the nucleus of what later would become the Geological Museum and the Zoological Museum. In 1621 Ole Worm also became the director of the Botanical Garden, which at that time had been quite neglected. Here he introduced a large variety of medicinal plants and rare species from abroad.

Today the Natural History Museum of Denmark is organized under the Faculty of Science at the University of Copenhagen.

== Collections ==
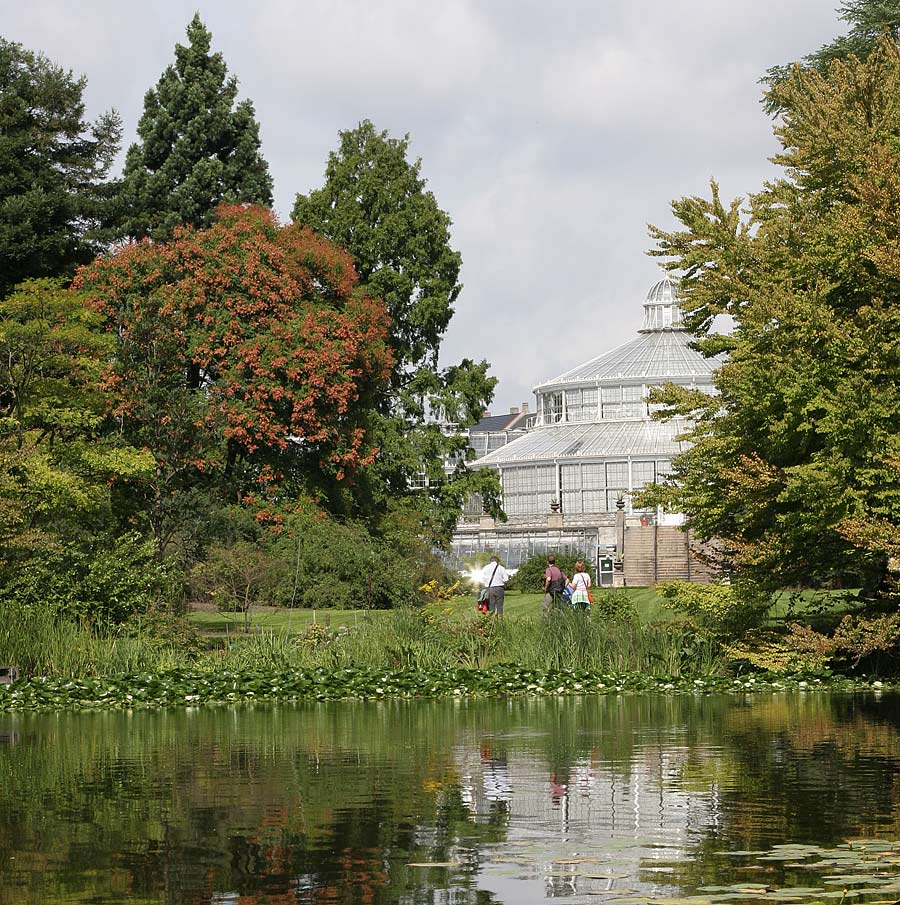
A view of the Palm House across the lake

The items in the Natural History Museum have been collected over four centuries. Although typically listed as containing about 14 million objects, also in some recent publications, this is based on decade old inventory. In 2023, a review of natural history museums of the world, also involving scientists from the Natural History Museum of Denmark, placed the number at about 17 million, making it the largest scientific natural history collection in the Nordic countries and one of the largest in the world. The collections include taxidermied specimens, skins and skeletons, specimens preserved in jars with ethanol, invertebrates on pins, eggs, DNA and tissue samples (a collection that has grown rapidly in recent decades as it contains Denmark's national natural history DNA and Tissue Repository), plants on herbarium sheets, fossils, minerals, meteorites and more, from all over the world. Among these are thousands of type specimens. Additionally, the living collections of the Botanical Garden number some 10,000 plant species such as orchids, cacti, carnivorous plants and trees.

Hundreds of scientists from all over the world visit the collection each year and many specimens are sent to scientists elsewhere as loans for use in research.

== Exhibitions ==
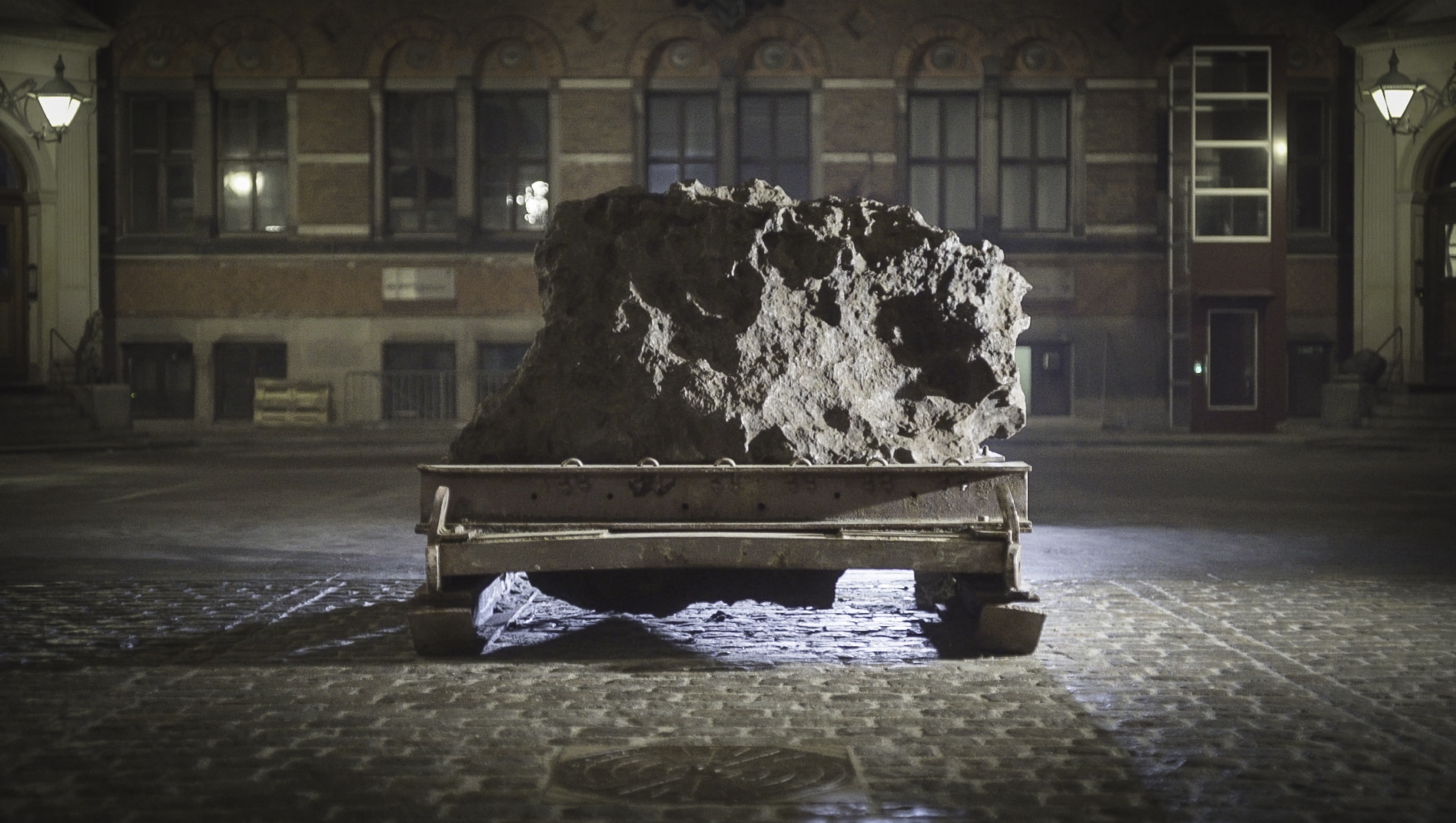
The Agpalilik meteorite outside the Geological Museum

Today, all exhibitions and public engagement programs are located at the Natural History Museum of Denmark (the former Geological Museum) and in the adjacent Botanical Gardens. Since the merger, the Botanical Gardens and its greenhouses/glasshouses have remained open, and the mineral collection, along with temporary exhibits, are still on display in the buildings of the former Geological Museum.

The Zoological Museum that was located separately was closed in October 2022 as a part of the preparations for a new and larger Natural History Museum building in the Botanical Garden. The new Natural History Museum building will open on March 6th 2027.

== Directors ==
- 2004–2007: Henrik Enghoff
- 2007–2014: Morten Meldgaard
- 2015: Kurt H. Kjær (interim)
- 2015-2024: Peter C. Kjærgaard
- 1. July 2024: Nina Rønsted
