= Death (EP) =

EP by Thy Serpent
- Released: 2000
- Genre: Blackened doom metal

Death an album by Finnish black metal band Thy Serpent released by Spinefarm Records in 2000. The lineup included guitarist and songwriter Tomi Ullgren, formerly of Rapture.

== Track listing ==
| No. | Title | Length |
|---|---|---|
| 1. | "Deathbearer" | 4:23 |
| 2. | "Wounds of Death" | 7:19 |
| 3. | "Sleep in Oblivion" | 5:33 |
| 4. | "Parasites" | 5:11 |

== Reception ==
A review in Teeth of the Divine called Death "the most emotive blackened metal I've heard in ages...moving, engaging, and inescapably impressive".

A review in MetalReviews.com noted that the four songs offer contrasting tempos and styles, stating, "A new page in the history of extreme metal has been written this year with wonderful records and this Death is one of them."

== Credits ==
- Azhemin - Vocals / bass guitar / keyboards
- Sami Tenetz - Rhythm guitar / Vocals
- Tomi Ullgren - Guitar
- Teemu Laitinen - Drums
