= De'Ath =

De'Ath, de'Ath, or d'Ath is a surname. Notable people with the surname include:

== People with the surname ==
- Charles De'Ath (born 1968), English actor
- David D'Ath (died 1990), member of The Skeptics
- Eric D'Ath (1897–1979), New Zealand pathologist
- Fran De'Ath, English peace activist in the 1980s
- Lawson D'Ath (born 1992), English footballer
- Nigel De'ath (born 1965), English speedway rider
- Rod de'Ath (1950–2014), Welsh drummer
- Yvette D'Ath (born 1970), Australian politician
- Wilfred De'Ath (1937–2020), British author, journalist and BBC radio producer

== Fictional characters with the surname ==
- Giles De'Ath, in the film Love and Death on Long Island
- Sydney De'Ath, original name of the Judge Dredd character Judge Death
- Theodore De'Ath, in Majella Cullinane's 2018 novel The Life of De'Ath
- Peter Death Bredon Wimsey, the aristocratic detective Lord Peter Wimsey in stories by Dorothy L. Sayers
- Sir Wilfred Death, in The Black Adder episode "The Black Seal"
- Ian and Angus De'ath in The Avengers episode "Castle De'ath"

== See also ==
- Dietmar Dath (born 1970), German author, journalist and translator
- Ducasse d'Ath, a traditional folk festival in Ath, Belgium
