= Sudden death =

Sudden Death or Sudden death may refer to:

== Medical ==
- Cardiac arrest, also known as sudden cardiac death, natural death from cardiac causes
- Sudden cardiac death of athletes
- Sudden infant death syndrome
- Sudden unexpected death in epilepsy
- Sudden arrhythmic death syndrome, a sudden unexpected death mainly during sleep

== Sports ==
- Sudden death (sport), a form of competition where play ends as soon as one competitor is ahead of the others
- 1958 NFL Championship Game, nicknamed "Sudden Death" for its dramatic ending

== Arts and entertainment ==
=== Film and television ===
- Sudden Death (1977 film), a Philippine action film
- Sudden Death (1995 film), an American action film starring Jean-Claude Van Damme
- "Sudden Death" (CSI: Miami), a 2010 television episode
- "Sudden Death" (Hit the Floor), a 2014 television episode
- "Sudden Death" (Murder, She Wrote), a 1985 television episode
- Sudden Death, the main antagonist of NFL Rush Zone seasons 1 and 3
- Died Suddenly (2022 film), an online anti-vaccination propaganda film

=== Music ===
- Svdden Death, American DJ and producer
- Sudden Death Records, a Canadian record label
- "Sudden Death" (song), by Megadeth, 2010
- "Sudden Death", a song by Bathory from Destroyer of Worlds, 2001

== Literature ==
- Sudden Death (novel), a 1932 novel by Freeman Wills Crofts

== Other ==
- Sudden death syndrome, a disease in soybean plants
- Blair's Sudden Death Sauce, a very hot sauce for food
