= Savissivik =

Savissivik Havighivik
- Location within Greenland
- Coordinates: 76°01′10″N 65°06′50″W
- State: Kingdom of Denmark
- Constituent country: Greenland
- Municipality: Avannaata

Population (2026)
  - Total: 40
- Time zone: UTC−02:00 (Western Greenland Time)
  - Summer (DST): UTC−01:00 (Western Greenland Summer Time)
- Postal code: 3970 Pituffik

Savissivik (West Greenlandic; old spelling: Savigsivik) or Havighivik (Inuktun) (IATA: SVR) is a settlement in the Avannaata municipality in northern Greenland. Located on Meteorite Island, off the northern shores of Melville Bay, the settlement had 40 inhabitants in 2026.

== History ==
In the Greenlandic language, the name Savissivik means "Place of Meteoric Iron" or "Knives", alluding to the numerous meteorite fragments that have been found in the area dating to about 10,000 years ago. The Cape York meteorite is estimated to have weighed 100 tonnes before it exploded. The iron from the meteorite is believed to have attracted migrating Inuit from Arctic Canada.

== Transport ==
Air Greenland operates settlement flights to Qaanaaq Airport via Pituffik Space Base. The twice-weekly flights are subsidized by the Government of Greenland. Transfers at the airbase are subject to access restrictions by the Danish Foreign Ministry.

== Population ==
The population of Savissivik decreased by over 40 percent relative to the 1990 levels, and by 10 percent relative to 2000 levels.

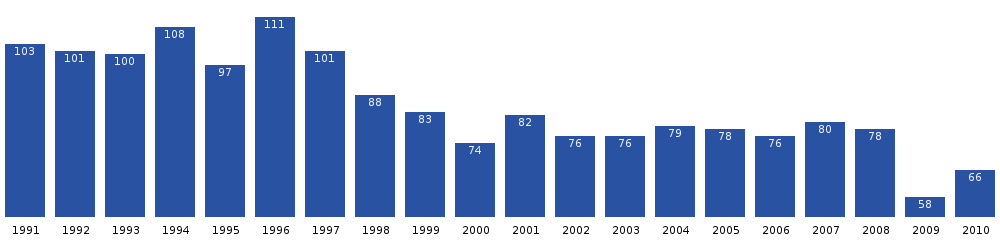
Savissivik population growth dynamics in the last two decades. Source: Statistics Greenland

== Film ==
Savissivik is depicted in the 2023 documentary film The Color of Ice. The film follows a local hunter, Olennguaq Kristensen, and highlights the climate and cultural change underway in Northwest Greenland. Savissivik itself is alternatively portrayed in the documentary as harsh outdoors and cozy indoors. The film, and Kristensen, appeared at the 2024 Nuuk International Film Festival.
