= Dead (disambiguation) =

Dead refers to that which has experienced death.

Dead may also refer to:

== Music ==
=== Artists ===
- Dead (musician), Per Yngve Ohlin, Swedish black metal vocalist
- Dead!, an English rock band
- Grateful Dead, an American rock band

=== Albums ===
- Dead (Obituary album)
- Dead (Young Fathers album)
- Dead (EP), by Blackbear

=== Songs ===
- "Dead" (Madison Beer song) (2018)
- "Dead!" (song) by My Chemical Romance (2006)
- "Dead", by Asking Alexandria from From Death to Destiny (2013)
- "Dead", by Atreyu from The End Is Not the End (2026)
- "Dead", by Beartooth from Disgusting (2014)
- "Dead", by Cardi B featuring Summer Walker from Am I the Drama? (2025)
- "Dead", by Converge from Petitioning the Empty Sky (1996)
- "Dead", by Jim Martin from Milk and Blood (1997)
- "Dead", by Korn from Issues (1999)
- "Dead", by Norther from Mirror of Madness (2002)
- "Dead", by the Pixies from Doolittle (1989)
- "Dead", by Red Harvest from Sick Transit Gloria Mundi (2002)
- "Dead", by They Might Be Giants from Flood (1990)
- "Dead", by Zoé from The Room (2005)
- "Dead", by ¥$ featuring Lil Durk and Future from Vultures 2 (2024)

== Film and television ==
- Dead (film), a 2020 New Zealand comedy horror film
- "Dead" (Law & Order: Criminal Intent), a 2002 television episode
- "Dead" (Shameless), a 2004 television episode

== Other uses ==
- Diethyl azodicarboxylate (DEAD), an organic compound
- Destruction of Enemy Air Defenses (DEAD); see Suppression of Enemy Air Defenses (SEAD)

== See also ==
- Dead River (disambiguation)
- Death (disambiguation)
- The Dead (disambiguation)
