= Omega (disambiguation) =

Omega (Ω or ω) is the last letter of the Greek alphabet. Omega may also refer to:

== Arts, entertainment and media ==
=== Fictional entities ===
==== Characters ====
- Omega (Doctor Who)
- Omega, a humanised Dalek from The Evil of the Daleks
- Omega, in Maximum Ride
- Omega, in the Mega Man Zero series
- E-123 Omega, a Sonic the Hedgehog character
- Omega, or Genra, a Dead or Alive character
- Omega Ranger, a Power Rangers S.P.D. character
- Omega Rugal, in The King of Fighters
- Omega, in the 2021 animated series Star Wars: The Bad Batch
- The Omega (Ninjago), in Ninjago
- Omega Flowey, a villain in the game Undertale
- Omega, a character of the "omega" sex in the subgenre Omegaverse

==== Other fictional entities ====
- Omega, a government agency in the film True Lies
- Omega 13, a device in the 1999 science fiction comedy Galaxy Quest
- The Omegas, in the 2006 film X-Men: The Last Stand
- Omega OS, an operating system in the 2018 game PC Building Simulator

=== Film and television ===
- "Omega" (Dollhouse), the 12th episode of the TV series Dollhouse
- "The Omega Directive", an episode of Star Trek: Voyager, involving a substance called "Omega"
- "Omega" (The Walking Dead), an episode of the television series The Walking Dead
- The Omega Man, 1971 American film

=== Literature ===
- Omega (Harris novel), by Christine Harris, 2000
- Omega (McDevitt novel), Jack McDevitt, 2003
- Omega (Leonard novel), by Raymond Leonard, 1986
- Omega: The Last Days of the World, an 1894 science fiction novel by Camille Flammarion
- Omega the Unknown, an American comic book by Marvel Comics

=== Music ===
==== Albums ====
- Omega (Asia album), 2010
- Omega (Epica album), 2021
- Omega (Jelena Karleuša album), 2023
- Juggernaut: Omega, by Periphery, 2015, and a song on that album
- Omega, by Hound Dog, 2005
- Omega, by Azaghal, 2008
- Omega, by Enrique Morente, 1995
- Omega, by Immanuel Wilkins, 2020

==== Songs ====
- "Omega" (song), by Rosalía featuring Ralphie Choo, 2024
- "Ω", by BT from _, 2003
- "Omega", by Bruce Dickinson from Accident of Birth, 1997
- "Omega", Crystal Lake from True North, 2016
- "Omega", Rebecca St. James from Pray, 1998
- "Omega", by SZA from Z, 2014

==== Other uses in music ====
- Omega (record label), a Dutch record label
- Omega (singer) (born 1979), a Dominican merengue singer
- Queen Omega (singer) (born 1981), a Trinidadian reggae singer
- Omega (band), a Hungarian rock band
- Omega and the Mechanical Animals, a moniker adopted by Marilyn Manson and his band

=== Other uses in arts, entertainment and media ===
- Omega (audio drama), based on Doctor Who
- Omega (video game), 1989
- Omega (journal), an academic journal dedicated to the study of death and dying
- Omega Mart, an interactive art installation by Meow Wolf
- Omega Blitz, a Final Smash in Super Smash Bros. for Nintendo 3DS / Wii U
- Omega TV Cyprus, a television channel in Cyprus

== Businesses and organisations ==
- OMEGA (counterterrorism unit), in Latvia
- Omega Aerial Refueling Services
- OMEGA Championship Wrestling, a wrestling promotion
- Omega Engineering, an American instrumentation company
- Omega Institute for Holistic Studies, in Rhinebeck, New York, U.S.
- Omega Pharma, a Belgian pharmaceutical company
- Omega SA, a Swiss luxury watchmaker
- Omega Special Task Force, in Georgia
- Joint Task Force OMEGA, of the Colombian military
- Omega Training Group, providing support for defense-oriented programs
- Omega Trust, a fraudulent American investment scheme
- Omega (prison gang), Singapore prison gang

== People ==
- Kenny Omega, ring name of Canadian wrestler Tyson Smith (born 1983)
- Omega man, the producer of the Omega counterfeit coins

== Places ==
- Omega, California, U.S.
  - Omega Hydraulic Diggings, historical gold mining site
- Omega, Georgia, U.S.
- Omega, Indiana, U.S.
- Omega, Oklahoma, U.S.
- Omega Development Site, in Warrington, Cheshire, England

== Science and technology ==
=== Astronomy and astrodynamics ===
- Ω, the density parameter in Friedmann equations
- Omega Centauri, a globular cluster in the constellation of Centaurus
- Omega Nebula, a star cluster
- Argument of periapsis, abbreviated ω
- Longitude of the ascending node, abbreviated Ω

=== Computing ===
- Omega (T_{e}X), an extension of the typesetting system
- Omega Drivers, third-party drivers for ATI and nVidia graphics cards
- Ωmega, a strict pure functional programming language
- Omega language, in formal language theory

=== Mathematics ===
- Chaitin's constant, or halting probability, written as Ω
- Lambert W function, or omega function
  - Omega constant, a specific value derived from the Lambert W function
  - Wright omega function
- ω, the first infinite ordinal number, also understood as the set of all natural numbers
  - ω_{1} or Ω, the smallest uncountable ordinal number
- The absolute infinite, a putative largest ordinal number; sometimes denoted Ω.
- ω, Ω, Ω_{-}, Ω_{+} and Ω_{±} in big O notation
- Omega and agemo subgroup, in group theory
- Ω, an element in a subsumption lattice
- Prime omega function, in number theory
- The solid angle symbol, Ω

=== Other uses in science and technology ===
- OMEGA, an instrument on Mars Express Mars orbiter
- Omega (rocket), a cancelled space launch vehicle
- Omega (navigation system), the first worldwide radio navigation system
- OMEGA laser, at the Laboratory for Laser Energetics, University of Rochester, New York, U.S.
- Angular frequency, ω, in physics
- Angular velocity, ω, in physics
- K_{a}/K_{s} ratio, or ω, in genetics
- Ohm, symbol Ω, the unit of electrical resistance
- Omega equation, in meteorology
- Omega loop, a protein motif
- Omega baryon, a sub-atomic particle
- OMEGA process, an industrial chemical process to produce ethylene glycol from ethylene

== Transportation ==
- Chevrolet Omega, a car model by General Motors for Brazil
- Oldsmobile Omega, a car, 1973–1984
- Opel Omega, a car, 1986–2004
- Omega (barque), a sailing ship, 1887–1958

== Other uses ==
- Omega (Cyrillic) (Ѡ, ѡ), the Cyrillic counterpart of the Greek omega
- Omega (grape), another name for the Catawba grape
- Omega (photographic brand), a brand of cameras and enlargers
- Omega chain, a type of collier
- Omega Chess, a chess variant
- OMEGA Memorandum, a 1956 U.S. memorandum designed to marginalize Gamal Abdel Nasser
- Omega counterfeit, a series of counterfeit coins

== See also ==
- Alpha and Omega (disambiguation)
- Omega Point (disambiguation)
- Iomega, a brand of storage media
- Death (disambiguation)
- Ending (disambiguation)
- Demolition (disambiguation)
