= Back end =

Back end, back-end or backend may refer to:

== Electronics ==
=== Computing ===
- Back end (computing), the data access layer in software architecture
- Back-end CASE
- Back-end database, a database accessed indirectly through an external application
- Back-end processor, hardware that stores and retrieves data from a database

=== Integrated circuits ===
- Back-end design, in electronic circuit design flow
- Back end of line, in integrated circuit fabrication

== Other uses ==
- Archaic northern English dialect word for autumn
- Back end load, a mutual fund fee
- "Back End" (song), by Finesse2tymes
- "Backend" (song), a song on DaBaby's album Baby on Baby
- Slang for buttocks, an anatomical feature

== See also ==
- Back (disambiguation)
- End (disambiguation)
- Front end (disambiguation)
