= Front end =

Front end may refer to:

== Computing ==
- Front-end (computing), an interface between the user and the back end
- Front-end processor (computer), a small-sized computer
- Front-end processor (program)
- Front-end web development, the practice of producing HTML, CSS and JavaScript for a website or web application
- Front-end API, a type of application program interface
- Compiler front-end
- Debugger front-end

== Other ==
- Front-end bra, a stretchy type of vinyl that attaches to the front of a car
- Front-end, the foremost of a vehicle body
- Front-end engineering
- Front-end load, a charge in investing
- Front-end loader, construction equipment
- Front-end loading, in project management
- Front End Loader, a band
- RF front end, in electronics

== See also ==
- Front (disambiguation)
- End (disambiguation)
- Back end (disambiguation)
