= Front =

Front may refer to:

== Arts, entertainment, and media ==
=== Films ===
- The Front (1943 film), a 1943 Soviet drama film
- The Front, 1976 film

=== Music ===
- The Front (band), an American rock band signed to Columbia Records and active in the 1980s and early 1990s
- The Front (Canadian band), a Canadian studio band from the 1980s

=== Periodicals ===
- Front (magazine), a British men's magazine

=== Television ===
- Front TV, a Toronto broadcast design and branding firm
- "The Front" (The Blacklist), a 2014 episode of the TV series The Blacklist
- "The Front" (The Simpsons), a 1993 episode of the TV series The Simpsons

== Military ==
- Front (military), a geographical area where armies are engaged in conflict
- Front (military formation), roughly, an army group, especially in eastern Europe

== Places ==
- Front, Piedmont, an Italian municipality
- The Front, now part of the Delaware Park-Front Park System, in Buffalo, New York, United States
- The transition area between a mountain and a plain, possibly related to the notion of a frontslope; for example:
  - Rocky Mountain Front
  - Wasatch Front

== Science and technology ==
- Front (oceanography), a place where two water masses come together in the ocean
- Front (physics), a solution connecting two steady states
- Front (sociology), or mask, in dramaturgy
- Front and back, descriptors of phonemes in linguistics
- Front vowel, a class of vowel sounds, in linguistics
- Ice front of a glacier
- Weather front, a boundary separating air masses, and the cause of most weather phenomena

== Other uses ==
- Front organization, any entity set up by and controlled by another organization
- Front (Polish party), Polish political party
- Rebecca Front (born 1964), English comedy actress
- Grill (jewelry), also known as "front", jewelry for teeth

== See also ==
- Front end (disambiguation)
- Fronting (disambiguation)
- National Front (disambiguation)
- Full Frontal (disambiguation)
