= The End of the End =

The End of the End may refer to:

- "The End of the End", a song by Paul McCartney from his 2007 album Memory Almost Full
- "The End of the End", a song by the Orb from their 2018 album No Sounds Are Out of Bounds
- Black Sabbath: The End of the End, a 2017 film documenting Black Sabbath's final concert performance

== See also ==
- The End (disambiguation)
- The End of the Beginning (disambiguation)
