= Ethylene glycol (data page) =

Chemical data page

This page provides supplementary chemical data on ethylene glycol.

== Material Safety Data Sheet ==
The handling of this chemical may incur notable safety precautions. It is highly recommended that you seek the Material Safety Datasheet (MSDS) for this chemical from a reliable source and follow its directions.

- Science Stuff
- Mallinckrodt Baker.

== Structure and properties ==
Structure and properties
Index of refraction, n_{D}	1.4318 at 20°C
Abbe number	?
Dielectric constant, ε_{r}	41.4 ε_{0} at 20 °C
Bond strength	?
Bond length	?
Bond angle	?
Magnetic susceptibility	?
Surface tension	47.99 dyn/cm at 25°C
Viscosity	16.1 mPa·s at 25°C

== Thermodynamic properties ==
Phase behavior
Triple point	256 K (−17 °C), ? Pa
Critical point	720 K (447 °C), 8.2 MPa
Standard enthalpy change of fusion, Δ_{fus}H^{~~o~~}	9.9 kJ/mol
Standard entropy change of fusion, Δ_{fus}S^{~~o~~}	38.2 J/(mol·K)
Standard enthalpy change of vaporization, Δ_{vap}H^{~~o~~}	65.6 kJ/mol
Standard entropy change of vaporization, Δ_{vap}S^{~~o~~}	? J/(mol·K)
Solid properties
Standard enthalpy change of formation, Δ_{f}H^{~~o~~}_{solid}	? kJ/mol
Standard molar entropy, S^{~~o~~}_{solid}	? J/(mol K)
Heat capacity, c_{p}	? J/(mol K)
Liquid properties
Standard enthalpy change of formation, Δ_{f}H^{~~o~~}_{liquid}	−460 kJ/mol
Standard molar entropy, S^{~~o~~}_{liquid}	166.9 J/(mol·K)
Heat capacity, c_{p}	149.5 J/(mol·K)
Gas properties
Standard enthalpy change of formation, Δ_{f}H^{~~o~~}_{gas}	−3955.4 kJ/mol
Standard molar entropy, S^{~~o~~}_{gas}	311.8 J/(mol·K)
Heat capacity, c_{p}	78 J/(mol·K) at 25 °C

== Vapor pressure of liquid ==
P in mm Hg	1	10	40	100	400	760
T in °C	53.0	92.1	120.0	141.8	178.5	197.3

Table data obtained from CRC Handbook of Chemistry and Physics, 44th ed.

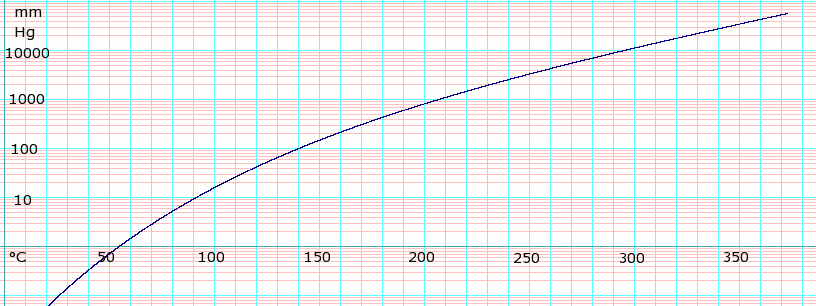
Temperature dependence of ethylene glycol vapor pressure. Uses formula $\log_e P[\text{kPa}] = -25.99771 \log_e T[\text{K}] - \frac{14768.57}{T[\text{K}]} + 191.4250 + 2.062331 \times 10^{-05}\,(T[\text{K}])^2$ obtained from CHERIC

== Freezing point of aqueous solutions ==
% ethylene glycol by volume	5	10	15	20	25	30	35	40	45	50
Freezing point (°F)	−1.1	−2.2	−3.9	−6.7	−8.9	−12.8	−16.1	−20.6	−26.7	−33.2
Specific gravity d^{90°}	1.004	1.006	1.012	1.017	1.020	1.024	1.028	1.032	1.037	1.040

Table obtained from Lange's Handbook of Chemistry, 10th ed. Specific gravity is referenced to water at 15.6 °C.

See also "Typical Freezing and Boiling Points of Aqueous Solutions of DOWTHERM SR-1 and DOWTHERM-SR4000" (PDF). Dow Chemical. Archived from the original (PDF) on 27 September 2007.

== Distillation data ==
Vapor–liquid equilibrium for ethylene glycol/water P = 760 mmHg
BP temp. °C	% by mole water
BP temp. °C	liquid	vapor
110.00	79.8	99.3
116.40	61.3	98.5
124.30	55.9	97.7
124.50	55.3	97.6
126.00	48.2	97.1
128.10	42.6	96.3
129.50	41.1	96.2
130.50	38.8	95.5
131.20	36.5	95.2
135.20	28.9	92.6
136.00	28.3	92.4
138.00	24.1	90.9
142.50	21.6	88.7
149.00	17.8	85.2
158.10	12.9	77.6
167.40	10.2	70.6
178.60	6.5	56.3
184.20	3.4	37.9

Vapor–liquid equilibrium for ethylene glycol/methanol P = 760 mmHg
BP temp. °C	% by mole methanol
BP temp. °C	liquid	vapor
66.70	93.0	99.9
73.20	82.1	99.8
79.60	66.4	99.7
84.70	53.0	99.3
90.20	45.7	99.0
93.80	40.6	98.5
101.40	36.3	97.9
102.70	35.6	97.5
104.90	32.2	96.7
105.10	22.7	94.6
109.90	21.2	93.3
113.00	19.5	92.3
121.50	13.7	86.4
149.60	10.3	74.6
157.50	4.6	51.5
166.30	3.6	42.0
175.20	2.5	30.4
183.50	1.4	18.1
189.10	0.5	6.8

== Spectral data ==
UV-Vis
λ_{max}	? nm
Extinction coefficient, ε	?
IR
Major absorption bands	? cm^{−1}
NMR
Proton NMR	3.3-3.7 ppm
Carbon-13 NMR	62-65 ppm
Other NMR data
MS
Masses of main fragments

This box:
- Except where noted otherwise, data relate to Standard temperature and pressure.
- Reliability of data general note.
