= Demolition (disambiguation) =

Demolition is the tearing-down of buildings and other structures.

Demolition may also refer to:

== Film and television ==
- Demolition (1978 film), an Australian TV film
- Demolition (2015 film), an American film starring Jake Gyllenhaal
- Demolition (TV series), a 2005 UK programme
- "Demolition" (The Young Ones), an episode of The Young Ones

== Music ==
=== Albums ===
- Demolition (Dungeon album), 1996
- Demolition (Girlschool album), 1980
- Demolition (Judas Priest album), 2001
- Demolition (Ryan Adams album), 2002
- Demolition (Vektor album), 2005
- Demolition, a 2024 album by Aaron Pritchett

=== Songs ===
- "Demolition", from the album Preservation Act 1 by the Kinks

== Other uses ==
- Demolition!, or The Demolished Man, a 1953 novel by Alfred Bester
- Demolition (professional wrestling), a former WWF tag team
- Star Wars: Demolition, a 2000 vehicular combat video game

== See also ==
- "Demolición", a 1965 song by Los Saicos
- Death (disambiguation)
- Ending (disambiguation)
- Omega (disambiguation)
