= Front-end bra =

Protective cover for automobiles

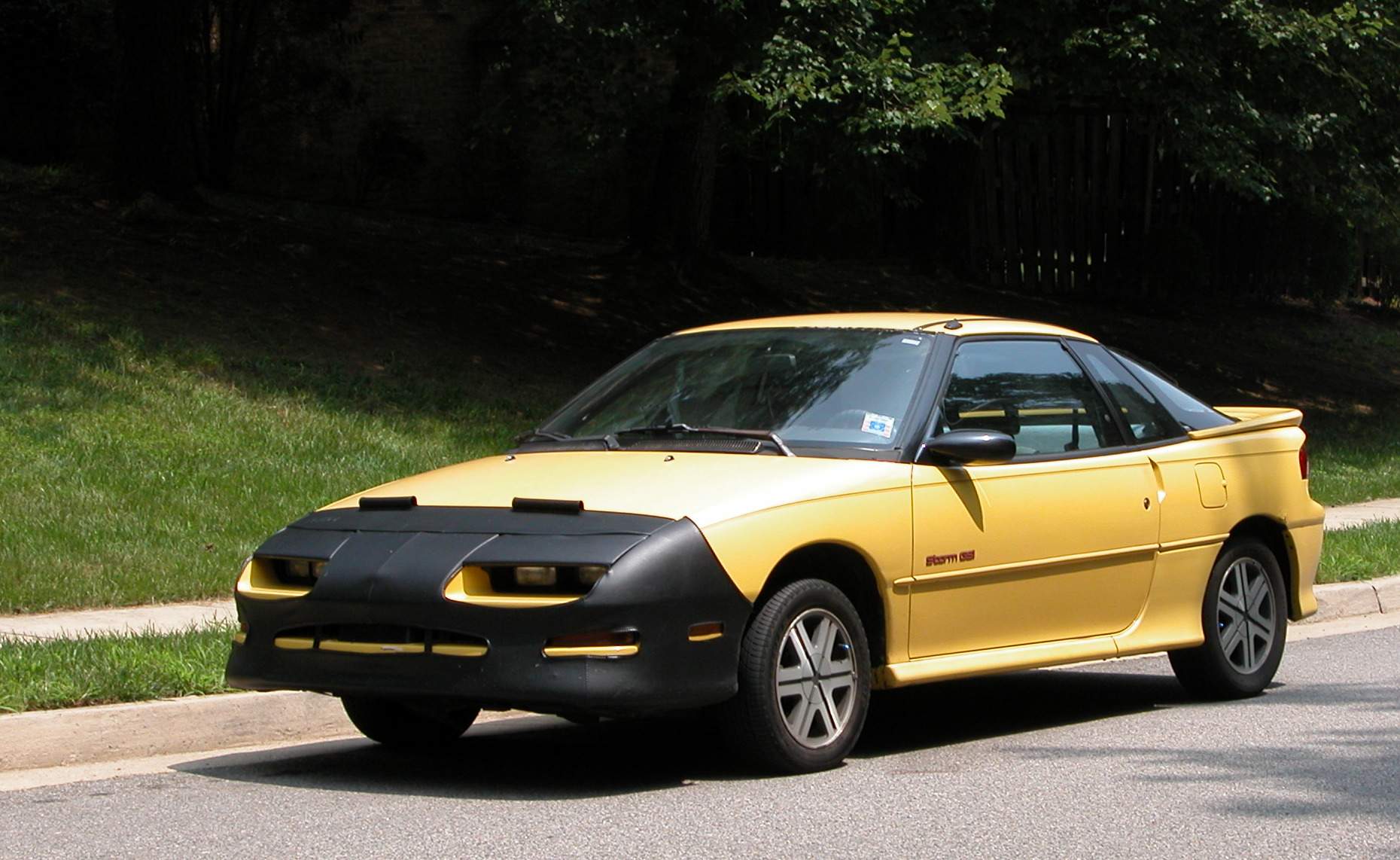
- A Geo Storm with a front-end bra
- Inventor: Bill Colgan
- Inception: 1961
- Manufacturer: Colgan Custom Manufacturing; Covercraft

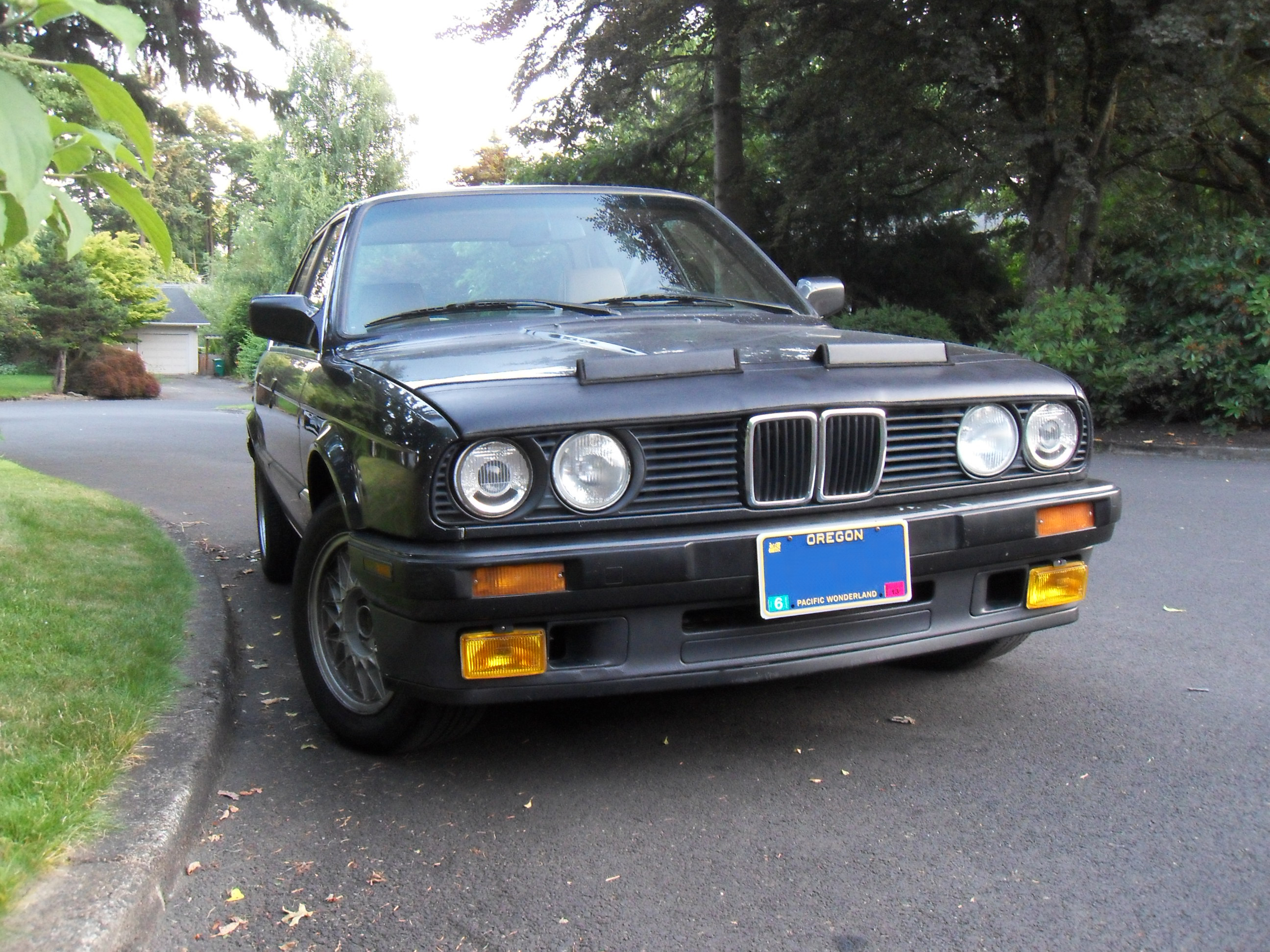
1991 BMW 318i (E30) with a hood bra

A front-end bra (also known as a car bra, bonnet bra, front-end cover, hood bra, auto bra, hood mask, car mask, etc.) is a (usually black) vinyl cover that attaches to the front of a car or other vehicle to protect the bumper, hood, and sides of the fenders from scratches. The inside of the bra is lined with a felt-like material.

== History ==
Bill Colgan, founder of Colgan Custom Manufacturing, Inc. successfully operated a trim and upholstery business in Burbank, California, for fifteen years prior to creating the car bra. The front-end bra was invented in 1961 when three German engineers from Lockheed commissioned Colgan for protective covers for their Porsches. The very first pattern was for the Porsche 356, the first order for which was for 12 units. Following a subsequent order of 150 covers, Colgan paused car cover production in order to concentrate on his main business.

By the mid-1970s, Colgan's comfortable position in the upholstery business allowed him to resume car cover production, having given a name to his invention: the "Original Car Bra." The popularity of the front-end bra peaked in the 1980s and 1990s in the United States.

Oklahoma-based Covercraft acquired Colgan Custom Manufacturing in 2009.

== Design ==
There are several types of front-end bras, including "full", "sport", and "T-style". "Sport" car bras cover less of the front of the vehicle than "full" bras. The "T-style" bra is generally intended for trucks and SUVs. Front-end bras can also be carbon-based, ostensibly to absorb the microwaves used in police radar equipment and thus minimize the risk of detection when speeding. Front-end bras are most commonly black, but may be available in other colors to match the color of the vehicle. "Clear" front-end bras exist in the form of a transparent protective film that can extend from the front end over the entire car body.

Along with dazzle camouflage, automakers may use larger bras together with cloth covers to conceal the design of an entire vehicle (or certain parts of it) during development and road testing.

== See also ==
- Paint protection film
- Window deflector
