= Fronting =

Fronting may refer to:

- Fronting (sound change), pronunciation of a sound further forward in the mouth
- Acting as the most prominent member of a group, as in the case of a lead singer
- Fronting, in the slang of Multiplicity (subculture), when one personality of a multiple/plural system (person with dissociative identity disorder or other condition associated with multiple personalities) controls the body
- Movement of a grammatical component to the start of a clause; see:
  - wh-fronting
  - English clause syntax § Fronting and zeroing
- Domain fronting, a censorship circumvention technique
- Fronting, a form of insurance fraud

== See also ==
- "Frontin'", a 2003 song by Pharrell Williams
- Front (disambiguation)
