= Ethylene glycol =

Organic compound ethane-1,2-diol

- Wireframe model of ethylene glycol

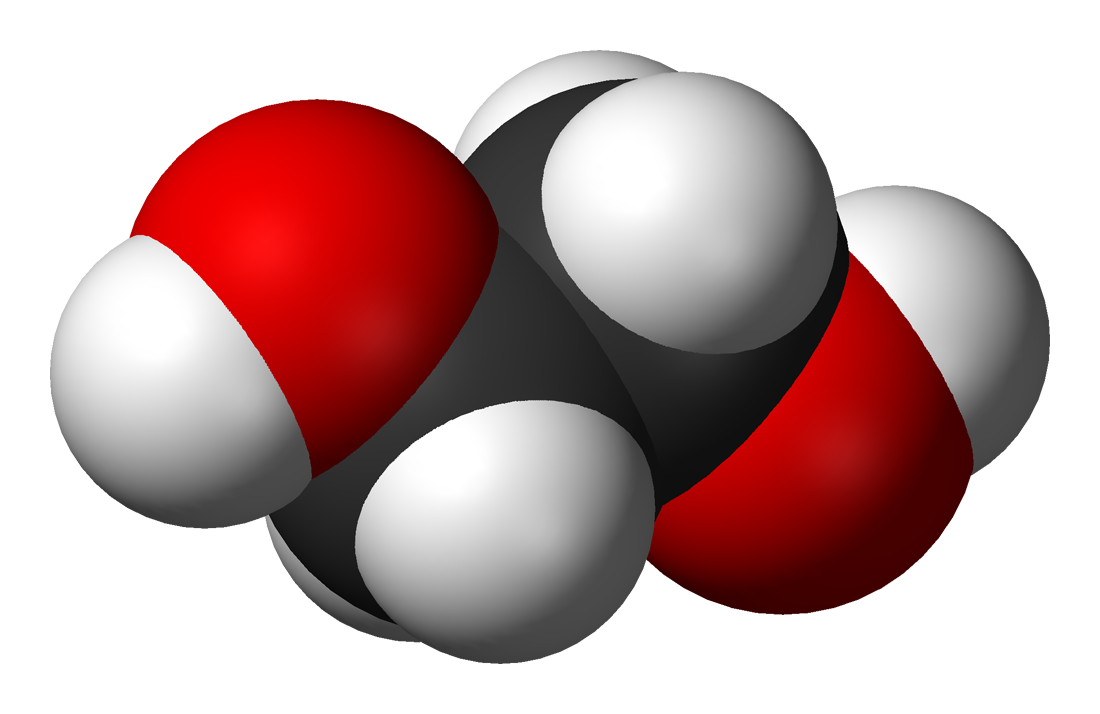
Spacefill model of ethylene glycol
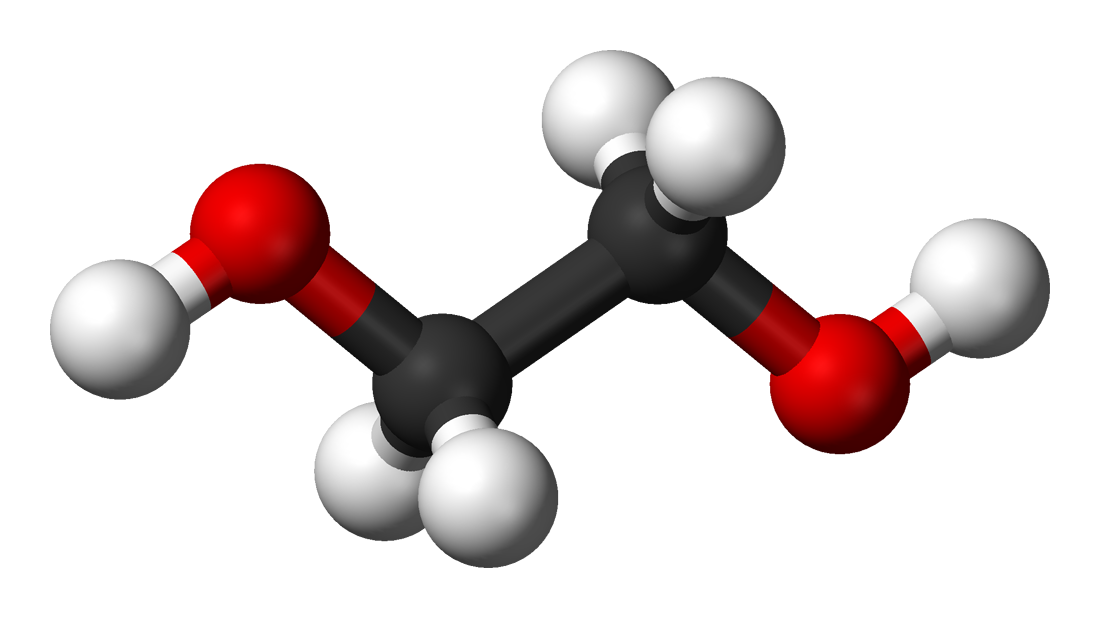
Ball and stick model of ethylene glycol
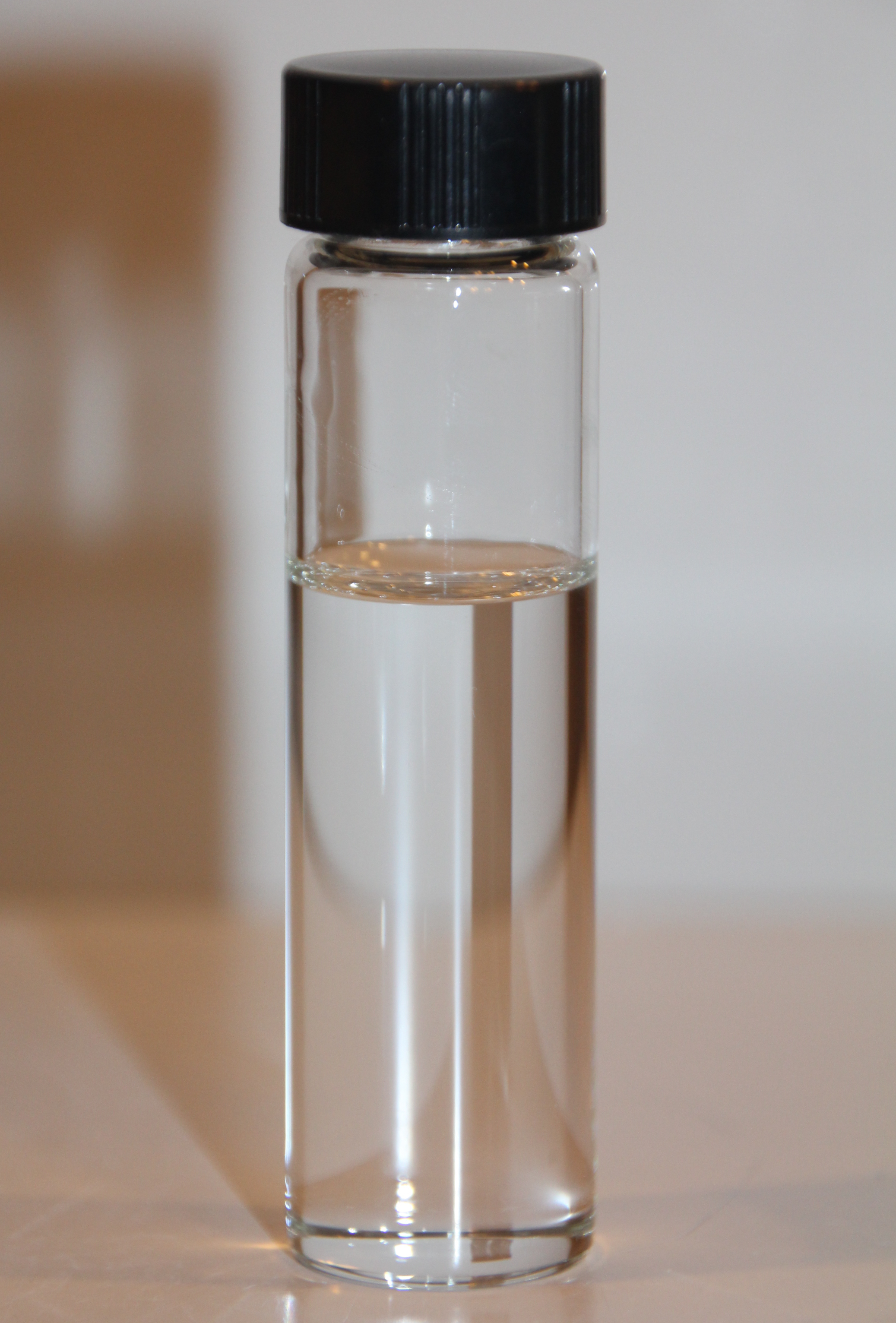
- Sample of ethylene glycol

Names
- IUPAC names Ethylene glycol Ethane-1,2-diol
- Preferred IUPAC name Ethane-1,2-diol
- Other names: Ethylene glycol; 1,2-Ethanediol; Ethandiol; Ethylene alcohol; Hypodicarbonous acid; Monoethylene glycol; 1,2-Dihydroxyethane; Glycol solvent

Identifiers
CAS Number	107-21-1
3D model (JSmol)	Interactive image
Abbreviations	MEG
Beilstein Reference	505945
ChEBI	CHEBI:30742
ChEMBL	ChEMBL457299
ChemSpider	13835235
ECHA InfoCard	100.003.159
EC Number	203-473-3
Gmelin Reference	943
KEGG	C01380
MeSH	Ethylene+glycol
PubChem CID	174
RTECS number	KW2975000
UNII	FC72KVT52F
UN number	3082
CompTox Dashboard (EPA)	DTXSID4027862 DTXSID8020597, DTXSID4027862
- InChI: InChI=1S/C2H6O2/c3-1-2-4/h3-4H,1-2H2 Key: LYCAIKOWRPUZTN-UHFFFAOYSA-N; InChI=1/C2H6O2/c3-1-2-4/h3-4H,1-2H2 Key: LYCAIKOWRPUZTN-UHFFFAOYAD
- SMILES: OCCO

Properties
Chemical formula	C_{2}H_{6}O_{2}
Molar mass	62.068 g·mol^{−1}
Appearance	colorless liquid
Odor	Odorless
Density	1.1132 g/cm^{3} (0.04022 lb/cu in)
Melting point	−12.9 °C (8.8 °F; 260.2 K)
Boiling point	197.3 °C (387.1 °F; 470.4 K)
Solubility in water	Miscible
Solubility	Soluble in alcohols, ethyl acetate, THF, and dioxane. Miscible with DCM and slightly miscible with diethyl ether. Not miscible with toluene or hexanes.
log P	−1.69
Vapor pressure	7.99 Pa (20 °C)
Viscosity	1.61×10^{−2} Pa·s

Thermochemistry
Heat capacity (C)	149.5 J/(mol·K)
Std molar entropy (S^{⦵}_{298})	166.9 J/(mol·K)
Std enthalpy of formation (Δ_{f}H^{⦵}_{298})	−460 kJ/mol

Hazards
- Occupational safety and health (OHS/OSH)
Main hazards	Harmful, produces poisonous oxalic acid when ingested, flammable
- GHS labelling
Pictograms	(GHS07: Exclamation mark) (GHS08: Health hazard)
Signal word	Warning
Hazard statements	H302, H373
Precautionary statements	P260, P264, P270, P301+P312, P302, P314, P330, P501
NFPA 704 (fire diamond)	2 1 0
Flash point	111 °C (232 °F; 384 K) closed cup
Autoignition temperature	410 °C (770 °F; 683 K)
Explosive limits	3.2–15.2%
- NIOSH (US health exposure limits)
PEL (Permissible)	None
REL (Recommended)	None established
IDLH (Immediate danger)	None
Safety data sheet (SDS)	External SDS 1 External SDS 2

Related compounds
Related diols	Propylene glycol; Diethylene glycol; Triethylene glycol; Polyethylene glycol

Supplementary data page
- Ethylene glycol (data page)
- Except where otherwise noted, data are given for materials in their standard state (at 25 °C [77 °F], 100 kPa). verify (what is ?) Infobox references

Ethylene glycol (IUPAC name: ethane-1,2-diol) is an organic compound with the formula (CH_{2}OH)_{2}. It is the simplest vicinal diol. It is mainly used for two purposes: as a raw material in the manufacture of polyester fibers and for antifreeze formulations. It is an odorless, colorless, flammable, viscous liquid. It has a sweet taste but is toxic in high concentrations.

== Production ==
=== Industrial routes ===
Ethylene glycol is produced from ethylene (ethene), via the intermediate ethylene oxide. Ethylene oxide reacts with water to produce ethylene glycol according to the chemical equation

C_{2}H_{4}O + H_{2}O → HO−CH_{2}CH_{2}−OH

This reaction can be catalyzed by either acids or bases or can occur at neutral pH under elevated temperatures. The highest yields of ethylene glycol occur at acidic or neutral pH with a large excess of water. Under these conditions, ethylene glycol yields of 90% can be achieved. The major byproducts are the oligomers diethylene glycol, triethylene glycol, and tetraethylene glycol. The separation of these oligomers and water is energy-intensive. World production of ethylene glycol was ~20 Mt in 2010.

A higher selectivity is achieved by the use of Shell's OMEGA process. In the OMEGA process, the ethylene oxide is first converted with carbon dioxide (CO_{2}) to ethylene carbonate. This ring is then hydrolyzed with a base catalyst in a second step to produce mono-ethylene glycol in 98% selectivity. The carbon dioxide is released in this step again and can be fed back into the process circuit. The carbon dioxide comes in part from ethylene oxide production, where a part of the ethylene is completely oxidized.

Ethylene glycol is produced from carbon monoxide in countries with large coal reserves and less stringent environmental regulations. The oxidative carbonylation of methanol to dimethyl oxalate provides a promising approach to the production of C_{1}-based ethylene glycol. Dimethyl oxalate can be converted into ethylene glycol in high yields (94.7%) by hydrogenation with a copper catalyst:

Because the methanol is recycled, only carbon monoxide, hydrogen, and oxygen are consumed. One plant with a production capacity of 200000 tons of ethylene glycol per year is in Inner Mongolia, and a second plant in the Chinese province of Henan with a capacity of 250000 tons per year was scheduled for 2012. As of 2015, four plants in China with a capacity of 200000 t/a each were operating, with at least 17 more to follow.

=== Biological routes ===
In E. coli, ethylene glycol can be produced reduction of glyceraldehyde catalyzed by aldehyde reductase. The glyceraldehyde is derived from sugar.

=== Historical routes ===
According to most sources, French chemist Charles-Adolphe Wurtz (1817–1884) first prepared ethylene glycol in 1856. He first treated "ethylene iodide" (1,2-Diiodoethane) with silver acetate and then hydrolyzed the resultant "ethylene diacetate" with potassium hydroxide. Wurtz named his new compound "glycol" because it shared qualities with both ethyl alcohol (with one hydroxyl group) and glycerin (with three hydroxyl groups). In 1859, Wurtz prepared ethylene glycol via the hydration of ethylene oxide. There appears to have been no commercial manufacture or application of ethylene glycol before World War I when it was synthesized from ethylene dichloride in Germany and used as a substitute for glycerol in the explosives industry.

In the United States, semicommercial production of ethylene glycol via ethylene chlorohydrin started in 1917. The first large-scale commercial glycol plant was erected in 1925 at South Charleston, West Virginia, by Carbide and Carbon Chemicals Co. (now Union Carbide Corp.). By 1929, ethylene glycol was being used by almost all dynamite manufacturers. In 1937, Carbide started up the first plant based on Lefort's process for vapor-phase oxidation of ethylene to ethylene oxide. Carbide maintained a monopoly on the direct oxidation process until 1953 when the Scientific Design process was commercialized and offered for licensing.

== Uses ==
=== Coolant and heat-transfer agent ===
Ethylene glycol is used as an antifreeze agent in coolants. It has useful applications in automobiles and air-conditioning systems that either have external chillers or air handlers or must cool below the freezing temperature of water. In geothermal heating/cooling systems, ethylene glycol is the fluid that transports heat through the use of a geothermal heat pump. The ethylene glycol either gains energy from the source (lake, ocean, water well) or dissipates heat to the sink, depending on whether the system is being used for heating or cooling.

Pure ethylene glycol has a specific heat capacity about one-half that of water. So, while providing freeze protection and an increased boiling point, ethylene glycol lowers the specific heat capacity of water mixtures relative to pure water. A 1:1 mix by mass has a specific heat capacity of about 3140 J/(kg·°C) (0.75 BTU/(lb·°F)), three-quarters that of pure water, thus requiring increased flow rates in same-system comparisons with water.

The mixture of ethylene glycol with water provides additional benefits to coolant and antifreeze solutions, such as preventing corrosion and acid degradation, as well as inhibiting the growth of most microbes and fungi. Mixtures of ethylene glycol and water are sometimes informally referred to in the industry as glycol concentrates, compounds, mixtures, or solutions.

Table of thermal and physical properties of saturated liquid ethylene glycol:

Temperature (°C)	Density (kg/m^{3})	Specific heat (kJ/(kg·K))	Kinematic viscosity (m^{2}/s)	Conductivity (W/(m⋅K))	Thermal diffusivity (m^{2}/s)	Prandtl number	Thermal expansivity (K^{−1})
0	1130.75	2.294	7.53×10^{−5}	0.242	9.34×10^{−8}	615	6.50×10^{−4}
20	1116.65	2.382	1.92×10^{−5}	0.249	9.39×10^{−8}	204	6.50×10^{−4}
40	1101.43	2.474	8.69×10^{−6}	0.256	9.39×10^{−8}	93	6.50×10^{−4}
60	1087.66	2.562	4.75×10^{−6}	0.26	9.32×10^{−8}	51	6.50×10^{−4}
80	1077.56	2.65	2.98×10^{−6}	0.261	9.21×10^{−8}	32.4	6.50×10^{−4}
100	1058.5	2.742	2.03×10^{−6}	0.263	9.08×10^{−8}	22.4	6.50×10^{−4}

=== Anti-freeze ===
Pure ethylene glycol freezes at about −12 °C (10.4 °F) but, when mixed with water, the mixture freezes at a lower temperature. For example, a mixture of 60% ethylene glycol and 40% water freezes at −45 °C (−49 °F). These mixtures are used as antifreeze solutions due to their greatly reduced freezing point compared to water alone. There is a difference in the mixing ratio depending on the specific glycol chosen; for ethylene glycol, the mixing ratios are typically 30/70 and 35/65, whereas the propylene glycol mixing ratios are typically 35/65 and 40/60. The mixture that is selected is typically based on the ratio that achieves the lowest freezing point. Freezing and boiling points are colligative properties of a solution, which depend on the concentration of dissolved substances. Salts, for example, lower the melting points of aqueous solutions and as such are commonly used for de-icing due to their low cost. However, salt solutions typically cannot be used in cooling systems because they induce corrosion of metals.

Because of its low freezing point, ethylene glycol is also used as a de-icing fluid for windshields and aircraft, as an antifreeze in automobile engines, and as a component of vitrification (anticrystallization) mixtures for low-temperature preservation of biological tissues and organs. Depending on the desired application, commercially available antifreeze formulations may contain additives such as corrosion inhibitors, buffers (for pH stabilisation), lubricants, and anti-foaming agents, in addition to the water-glycol mixture.

=== Precursor to polymers ===
Ethylene glycol is one precursor to polyethyleneterephthalate, which is produced on the multimillion ton scale annually.

In the plastic industry, ethylene glycol is an important precursor to polyester fibers and resins. Polyethylene terephthalate, used to make plastic bottles for soft drinks, is prepared from ethylene glycol. These polymers can be recycled as a source of ethylene glycol.

=== Other attributes ===
==== Dehydrating agent ====
Ethylene glycol is used in the natural gas industry to remove water vapor from natural gas before further processing, in much the same manner as triethylene glycol (TEG).

==== Hydrate inhibition ====
Because of its high boiling point and affinity for water, ethylene glycol is a useful desiccant. Ethylene glycol is widely used to inhibit the formation of natural gas clathrates (hydrates) in long multiphase pipelines that convey natural gas from remote gas fields to a gas processing facility. Ethylene glycol can be recovered from natural gas and reused as an inhibitor after purification treatment that removes water and inorganic salts.

Natural gas is dehydrated by ethylene glycol. In this application, ethylene glycol flows down from the top of a tower and meets a rising mixture of water vapor and hydrocarbon gases. Dry gas exits from the top of the tower. The glycol and water are separated, and the glycol is recycled. Instead of removing water, ethylene glycol can also be used to depress the temperature at which hydrates are formed. The purity of glycol used for hydrate suppression (monoethylene glycol) is typically around 80%, whereas the purity of glycol used for dehydration (triethylene glycol) is typically 95 to more than 99%. Moreover, the injection rate for hydrate suppression is much lower than the circulation rate in a glycol dehydration tower.

==== Precursor to other chemicals ====
Ethylene glycol is also used to manufacture the explosive ethylene glycol dinitrate by reaction with a mixture of nitric acid and concentrated sulfuric acid.

=== Organic building block ===
Although dwarfed by its use as a precursor to polyesters, ethylene glycol is useful in more specialized areas of organic chemistry.

It serves as a protecting group in organic synthesis for the manipulation of ketones and aldehydes. By reacting with the carbonyl to form an acetal product, it reduces the likelihood of nucleophilic attack at that carbonyl carbon. After the desired reaction is completed, the carbonyl can be regenerated using acid-catalyzed hydrolysis. In one example, isophorone was protected using ethylene glycol:

The glycol-derived dioxolane of ethyl acetoacetate is a commercial fragrance fructone.

== Miscellaneous chemical reactions ==
Silicon dioxide dissolves slowly in hot ethylene glycol in the presence of alkali metal base to produce silicates.

== Occurrence ==
Ethylene glycol exists naturally. It has also been observed in outer space.

== Toxicity ==
Ethylene glycol has relatively high mammalian toxicity when ingested, roughly on par with methanol, with an oral LD_{Lo} = 786 mg/kg for humans. The major danger is due to its sweet taste, which can attract children and animals. Upon ingestion, ethylene glycol is oxidized to glycolic acid, which is, in turn, oxidized to oxalic acid, which is toxic. It and its toxic byproducts first affect the central nervous system, then the heart, and finally the kidneys. Ingestion of sufficient amounts is fatal if untreated. Several deaths are recorded annually in the U.S. alone.

Antifreeze products for automotive use containing propylene glycol in place of ethylene glycol are available. They are generally considered safer to use, as propylene glycol is not as palatable (Note: Pure propylene glycol does not taste bitter, and pure propylene glycol is often used as a food additive, for instance in cake icing and shelf-stable whipped cream. Industrial-grade propylene glycol usually has a slightly bitter or acrid taste due to impurities. See the article on propylene glycol for more information. The relative sweetness of ethylene glycol and propylene glycol is discussed in the Merck Index, and neither compound is described as bitter.) and is converted in the body to lactic acid, a normal product of metabolism and exercise.

Australia, the UK, and seventeen US states (as of 2012) require the addition of a bitter flavoring (denatonium benzoate) to antifreeze. In December 2012, US antifreeze manufacturers agreed voluntarily to add a bitter flavoring to all antifreeze that is sold in the consumer market of the US.

In 2022, several hundred children died of acute kidney failure in Indonesia and The Gambia because the paracetamol syrup made by New Delhi-based Maiden Pharmaceuticals contained ethylene glycol and diethylene glycol, ingredients that have been linked to child deaths from acute kidney injury in The Gambia. In December 2022, Uzbekistan's health ministry said children died as a result of ethylene glycol in cough syrup made by Marion Biotech, which is based at Noida, near New Delhi.

== Environmental and health effects ==
Ethylene glycol is a high-production-volume chemical. It breaks down in air in about 10 days and in water or soil in a few weeks. It enters the environment through the dispersal of ethylene glycol-containing products, especially at airports, where it is used in de-icing agents for runways and airplanes. Ethylene glycol is a pollutant that impacts water quality, by exerting high levels of biochemical oxygen demand during degradation in water bodies. The pollution can harm fish, insects and other aquatic life by consuming oxygen needed by these organisms.

While prolonged low doses of ethylene glycol show no toxicity, at near-lethal doses (≥ 1000 mg/kg per day) ethylene glycol acts as a teratogen. "Based on a rather extensive database, it induces skeletal variations and malformations in rats and mice by all routes of exposure."
