= In the End (disambiguation) =

"In the End" is a 2001 song by Linkin Park.

In the End may also refer to:

== Music ==
=== Albums ===
- In the End (album), by the Cranberries, 2019
- In the End: Live & Rare, an EP by Linkin Park, 2002

=== Songs ===
- "In the End" (Black Veil Brides song), 2012
- "In the End" (Depeche Mode song), 2025
- "In the End" (Kat DeLuna song), 2008
- "In the End" (Snow Patrol song), 2012
- "In the End" (Stefanie Heinzmann song), 2015
- "In the End", by Anthrax from Worship Music, 2011
- "In the End", by Drake Bell from Telegraph, 2005
- "In the End", by Green Day from Dookie, 1994
- "In the End", by Nick Jonas & the Administration from Who I Am, 2010
- "In the End", by Passenger from The Boy Who Cried Wolf, 2017
- "In the End", by Rush from Fly by Night, 1975
- "In the End", by Shane Filan from You and Me, 2013
- "In the End", by Vanessa Carlton from Rabbits on the Run, 2011
- "In the End", by Yusuf Islam from An Other Cup, 2006

== Other uses ==
- In the End (radio series), a 1999 sequel to In the Red, a radio adaptation of the novel by Mark Tavener
- "In the End", a short story by Neil Gaiman from the 1998 collection Smoke and Mirrors

== See also ==
- "And in the End...", the final episode of the TV series ER
- The End (disambiguation)
