= Raymond Leonard =

Raymond Leonard (born 1941) is Emeritus Professor of Industrial Technology at Manchester University, known for both his scientific and literary work.

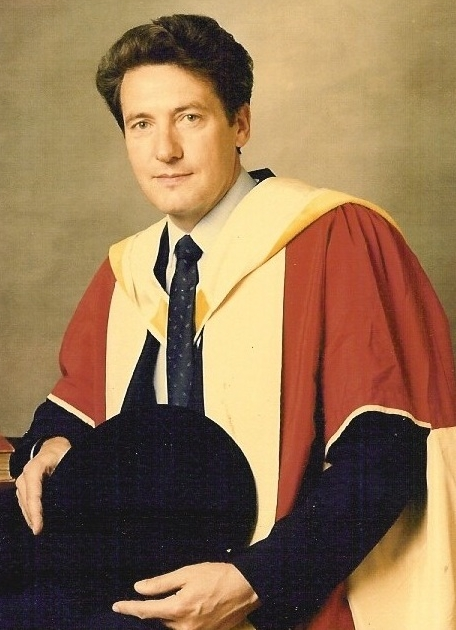
Professor Raymond Leonard

== Early life ==
Raymond Leonard was born in 1941 when the Manchester Blitz was at its height. His father, William was a railway worker and his mother, Florence, was a hospital cleaner. Having attended Saint Phillip's Junior School he moved to the Cavendish School in the heart of Manchester, where he finished top of the class. While at school, to supplement the family income, he delivered newspapers both night and morning around central Manchester including Sundays. He also had a stall on spare land selling fruit and vegetables on Saturdays. Having left school before his fifteenth birthday he began an apprenticeship at Crossley engines in Manchester. Here he won a state scholarship in 1961 to take a degree in Mechanical Engineering. His father died when he was 14, and his mother died when he was 19. He had no brothers or sisters. It was during these early years that Leonard developed his lifelong interest in science, religion and their complementary interactions.

== Scientific career ==
Having graduated with B.Sc and Ph.D degrees from Salford University, Leonard enjoyed a career in marine diesel industry before joining the University of Manchester (UMIST) in 1971. Here his initial research concerned manufacturing systems, particularly with reference to cellular manufacturing. This work was extended to include computer aided manufacturing, computer aided design, and manufacturing control. This later evolved into computer integrated manufacturing. The resulting publications were contained in a successful submission for the degree of Doctor of Science, D.Sc, in 1987. Later research related to an approach for diminishing Halon gas emissions into the atmosphere, which became widely used to safe ground the ozone layer. The department that Leonard established helped UMIST to gain the Queen's Anniversary Prize (1998), and he was the Senior Academic in the presentation party. Over the past 40 years he has given keynote lectures around the world, published in excess of 200 research papers, supervised over 150 research degrees in engineering, science and industrial management and co-authored two academic books.

=== Publications ===
Non-fiction

- How to Avoid the British Disease (with J.A Chatterton, Northgate Publishing, 1979, ISBN 0-85298-432-4)
- Technology and Production (with G Clews, Philip Allan, 1985, ISBN 0-86003-527-1)

Fiction

- The Nostradamus Inheritance (1985). London: Poplar, 1985. ISBN 978-0-907657-08-8
- OMEGA (1986). London: Poplar, 1986. ISBN 978-0-907657-12-5
- Legacy of the Shroud (1988). W.H. Allen, 1988. ISBN 978-0-352-32198-5

Poetry

- Pearls Along The Path, a collection of Professor Leonard's published poetry. 2011 ISBN 978-1-4538-3946-1

== Awards ==
- Queen's Anniversary Prize, 1999. The Royal Anniversary Trust, www.royalanniversarytrust.org.uk
