= Hood (car) =

Hinged cover over the engine of motor vehicles

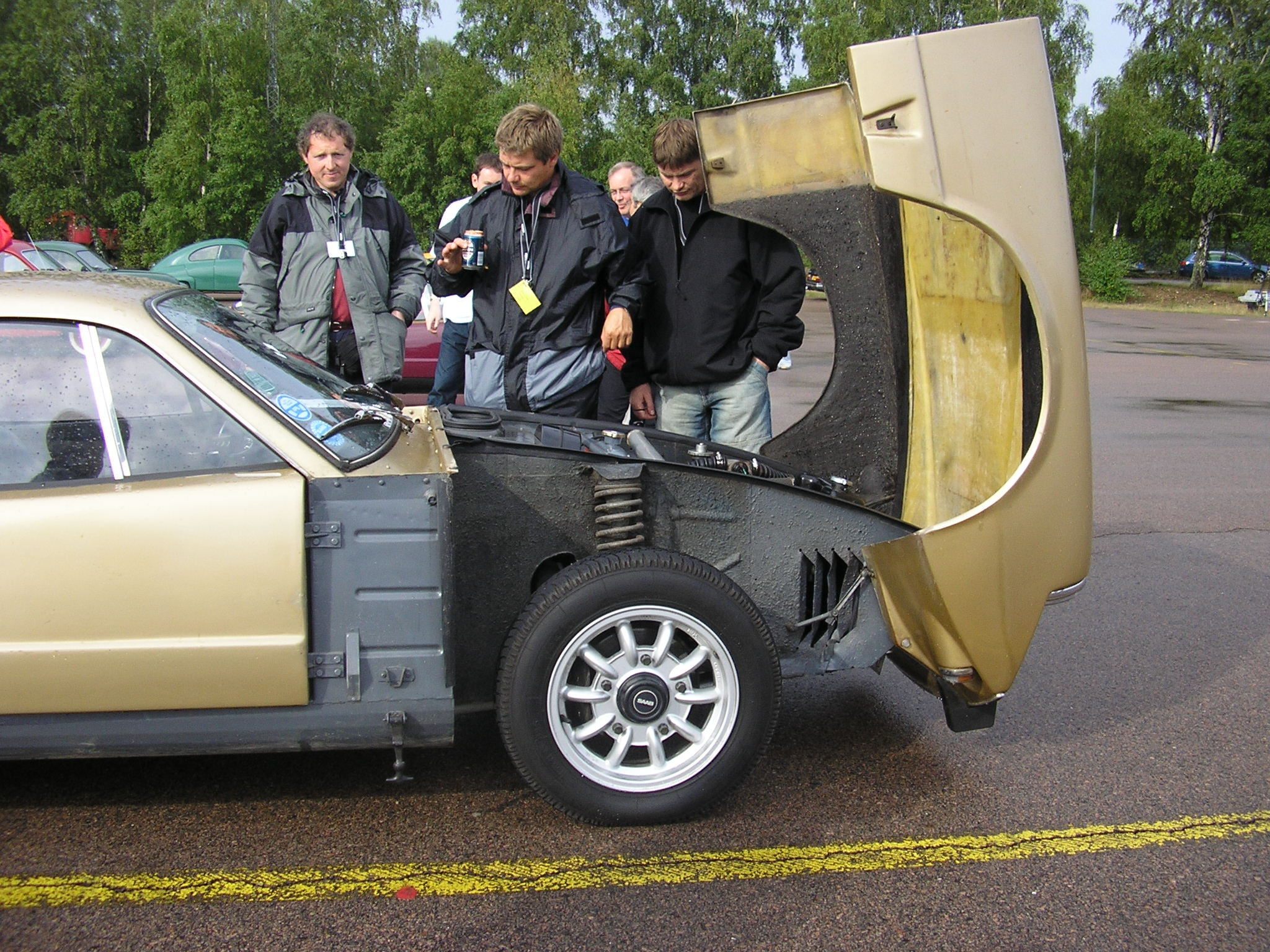
A flipfront provides easy access to the engine bay (Saab Sonett)

The hood (American English) or bonnet (Commonwealth English) is the hinged cover over the front of motor vehicles. This can open to allow access to the engine compartment (for front-engined vehicles) or luggage compartment (for rear-engined/mid-engined vehicles).

== Terminology ==
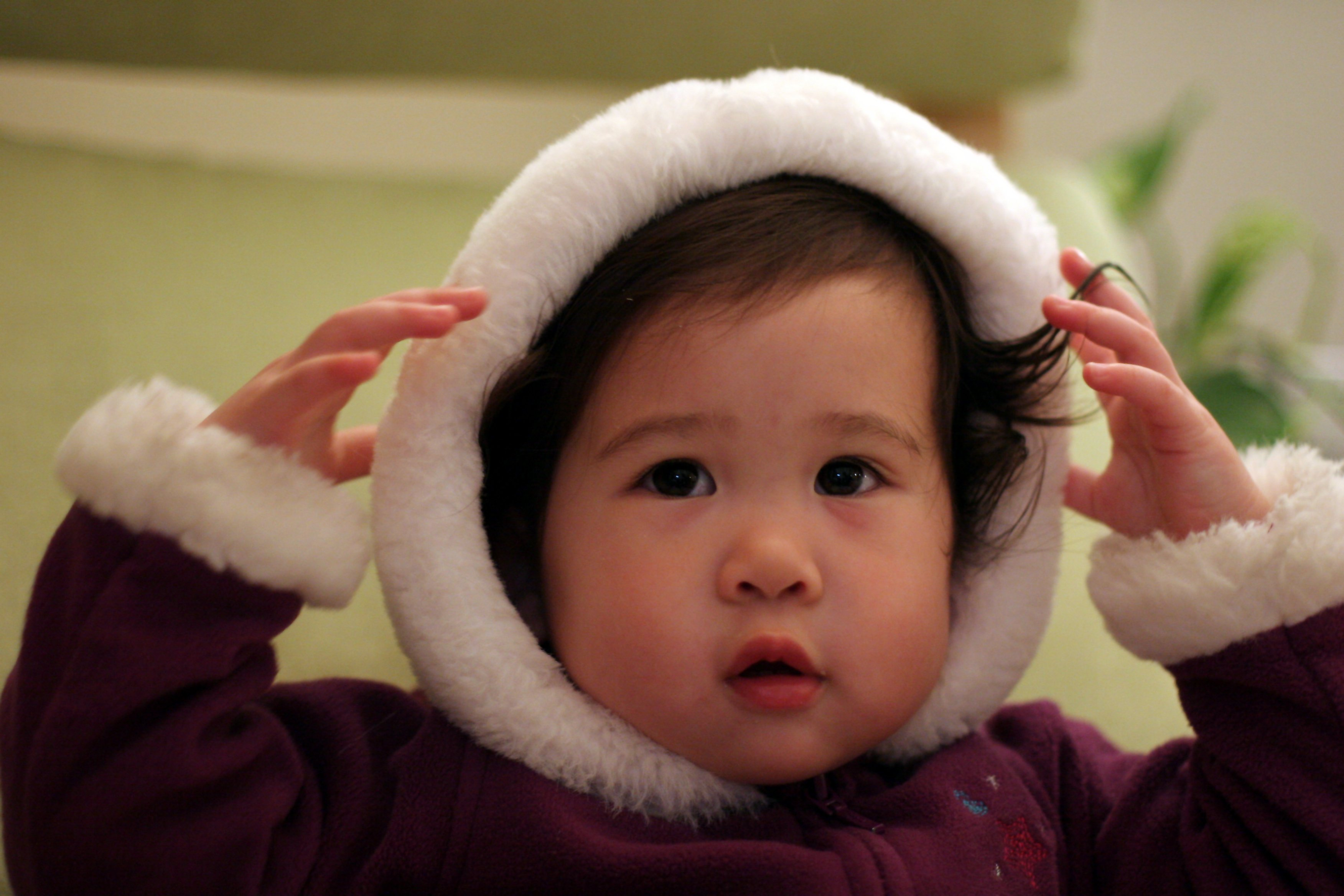
An infant wearing a hood.

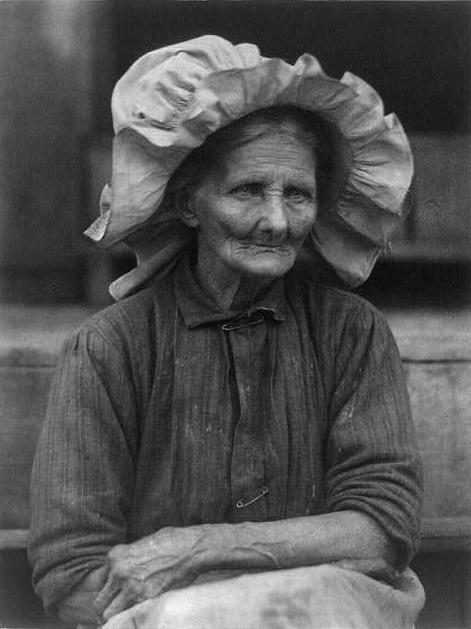
Elderly woman in sunbonnet

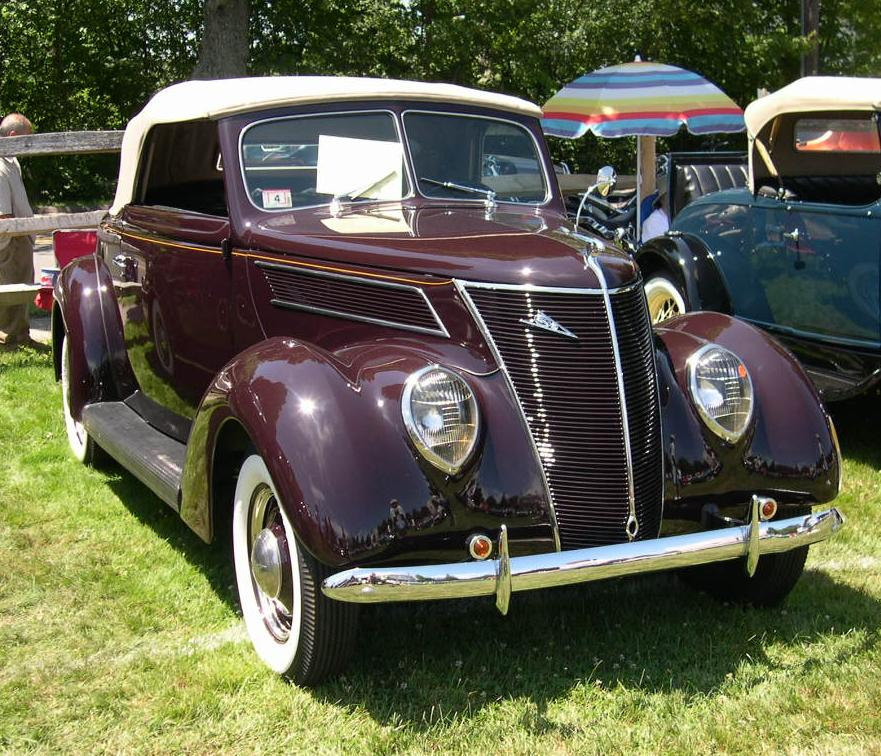
The hood on a 1937 Ford V8 Convertible

In British terminology, hood refers to a fabric cover over the passenger compartment of the car (known as the 'roof' or 'top' in the US). In many motor vehicles built in the 1930s and 1940s, the resemblance to an actual hood or bonnet is clear when open and viewed head-on. In modern vehicles it continues to serve the same purpose but no longer resembles a head covering.

== Styles and materials ==
On front-engined cars, the hood may be hinged at either the front or the rear edge, or in earlier models (e.g. the Ford Model T) it may be split into two sections, one each side, each hinged along the centre line. Another variant combines the bonnet and wheelarches into one section which allows the entire front bodywork to tilt forwards around a pivot near the front of the vehicle (e.g. that of the Triumph Herald).

Hoods are typically made of the same material as the rest of the body work. This may include steel, aluminium, fiberglass or carbon fiber. Some aftermarket companies produce replacements for steel hoods in fiberglass or carbon fiber to reduce vehicle weight.

== Release/ safety and security mechanisms ==
The hood release system is common on most vehicles and usually consists of an interior hood latch handle, hood release cable and hood latch assembly. The hood latch handle is usually located below the steering wheel, beside the driver's seat or set into the door frame. On race cars or cars with aftermarket hoods (that do not use the factory latch system) the hood may be held down by hood pins. Some aftermarket hoods that have a latch system are still equipped with hood pins to hold the hood buttoned down if the latch fails.

== Features ==
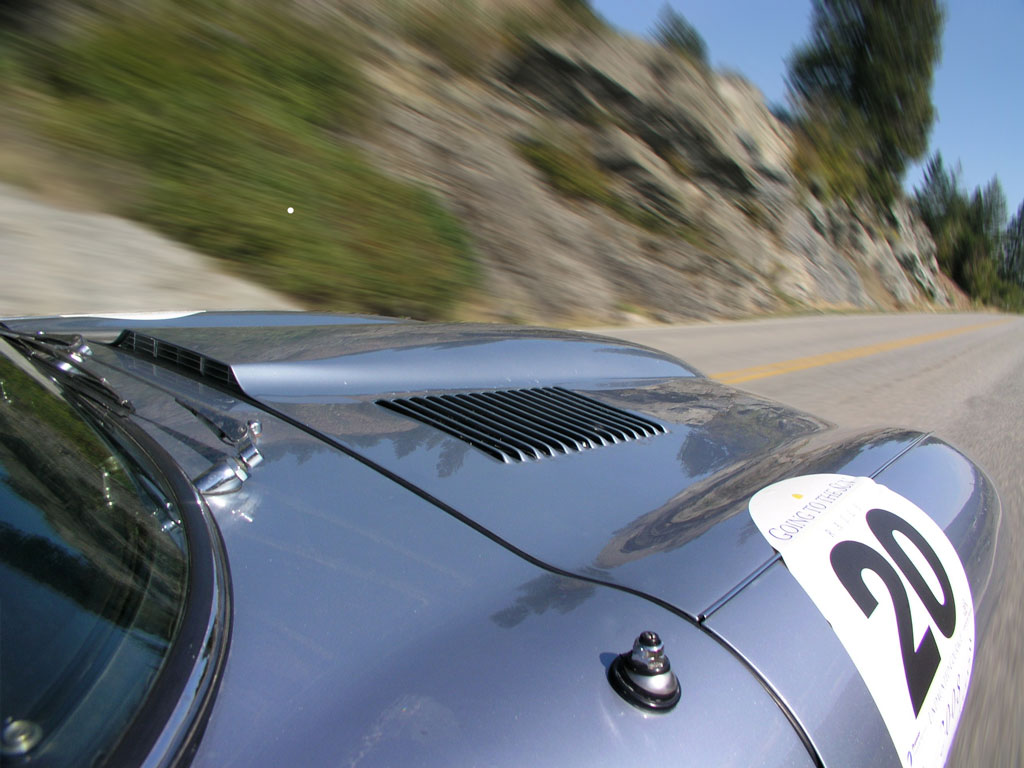
The distinctive power bulge of an E-type Jaguar

A hood may contain a hood ornament, hood scoop, and/or wiper jets. A portion of the hood may be raised in a power bulge, to fit a large engine or air filters.

== Pedestrian safety ==
In Japan and Europe, regulations have come into effect that place a limit on the severity of pedestrian head injury when struck by a motor vehicle. This is leading to more advanced hood designs, as evidenced by multicone hood inner panel designs as found on the Mazda RX-8 and other vehicles. Other changes are being made to use the hood as an active structure and push its surface several centimeters away from the hard motor components during a pedestrian crash. This may be achieved by mechanical (spring force) or pyrotechnic devices.

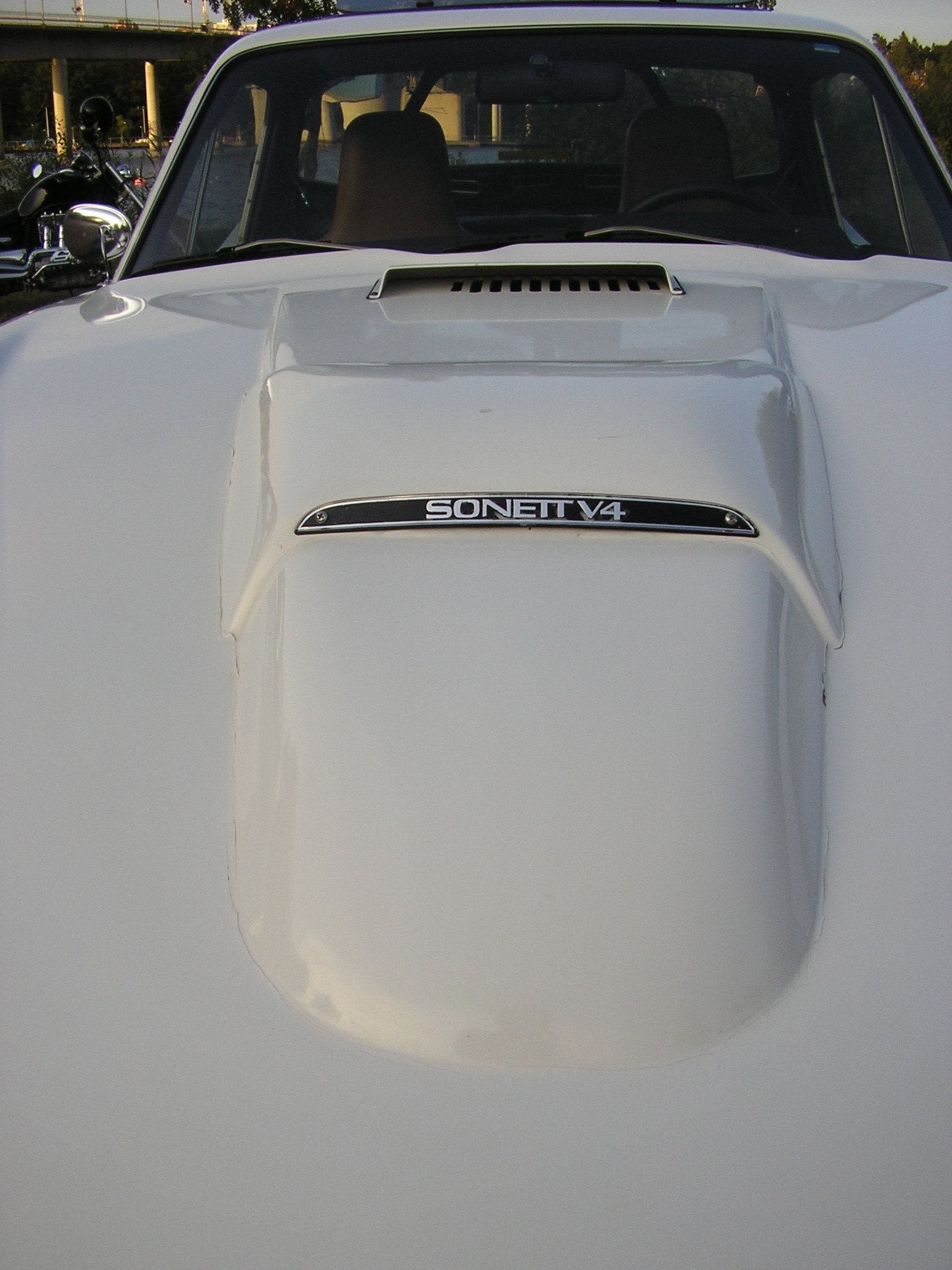
Some hoods may need a power bulge to fit over the engine and air filters, or enhance the aesthetic appearance of the hood

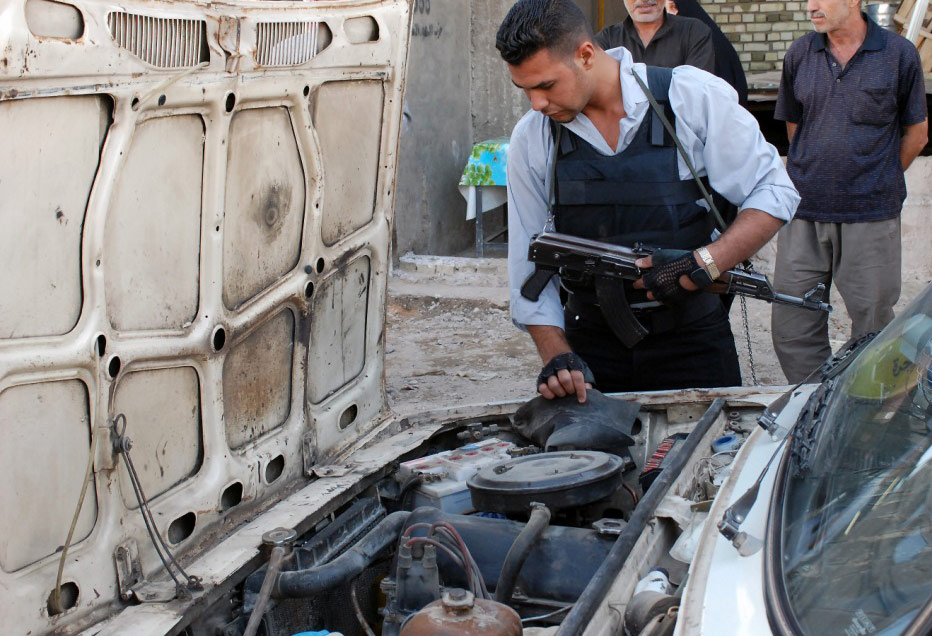
A flipfront hood

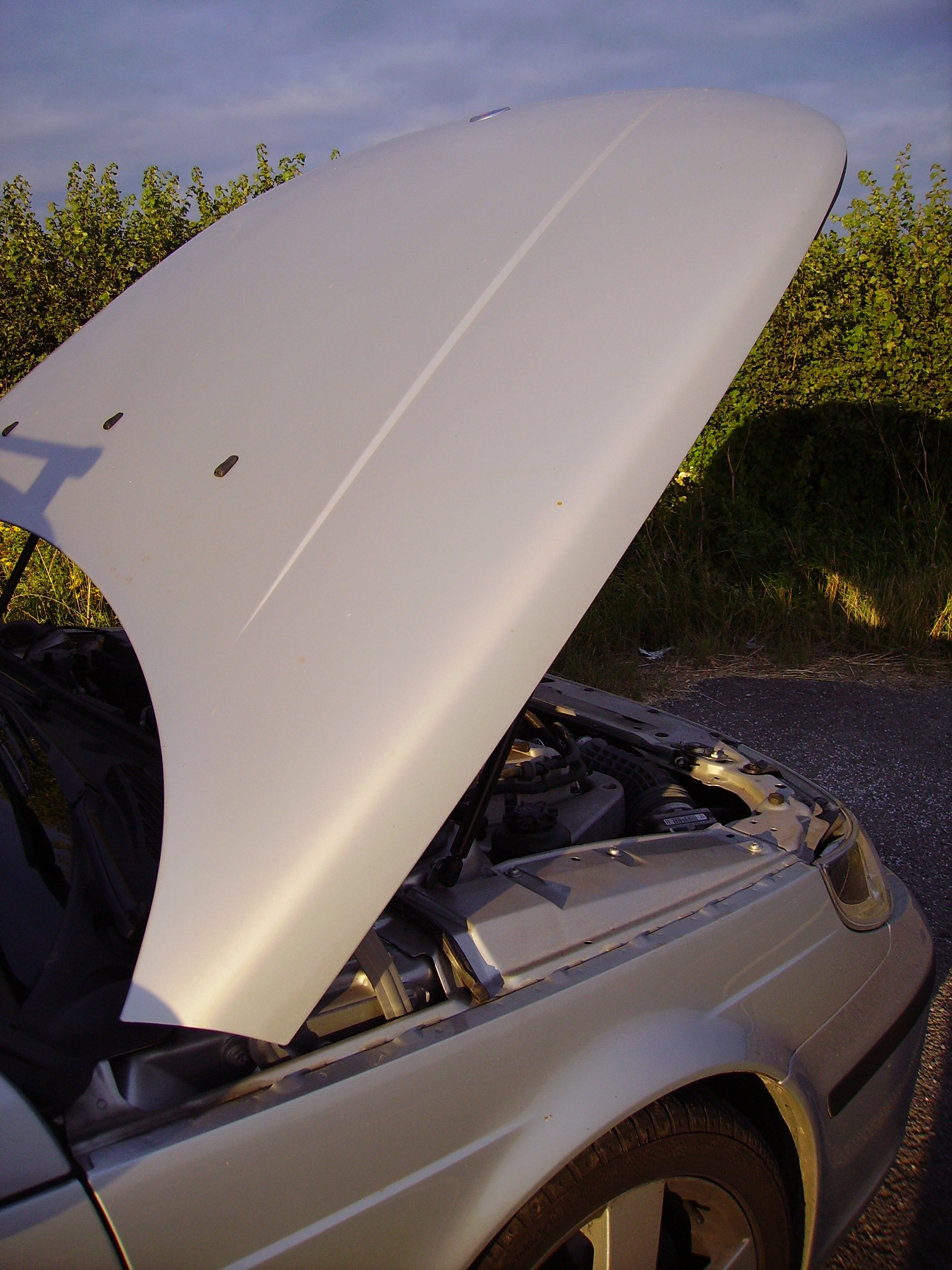
A rear-hinged clamshell hood on a Saab 9-5

== See also ==
- Front-end bra
- List of auto parts
- Trunk (automobile)
