= The End =

The End may refer to:

== Film ==
- The End (1953 film), an American short film by Christopher Maclaine
- The End (1978 film), an American comedy by Burt Reynolds
- The End, a Canadian film of 1995
- The End (1998 film), an American skateboarding documentary
- The End, a 1998 short by Joe Wright
- The End, a 2004 American film by Kirby Dick
- The End, a 2004 Indian Telugu-language film that received the Sarojini Devi Award for a Film on National Integration
- The End (2007 Canadian film), a dark comedy horror film
- The End (2007 Hungarian film), a comedy
- The End, a 2008 Spanish short starring Samuel Roukin
- The End (2012 film), a Spanish thriller
- The End, a 2013 film starring Sivan Levy
- The End (2016 film), a French mystery film
- The End?, a 2017 Italian horror film
- The End (2024 film), an apocalyptic musical

== Games ==
- The End (video game), 1980
- The End (role-playing game), a 1995 post-Armageddon role-playing game
- The End (Metal Gear), a character from Metal Gear Solid 3: Snake Eater
- The End, a levitating, endgame alternate dimension in Minecraft
- The End, two live events in Fortnite: Battle Royale
- The End, the main antagonist in Sonic Frontiers

== Literature ==
- The End (comics), a series published by Marvel Comics
- The End (novel), a A Series of Unfortunate Events novel by Lemony Snicket
- The End: Hitler's Germany 1944–45, a 2011 book by Ian Kershaw
- "The End" (poem), a poem by Wilfred Owen
- "The End" (story), a 1953 short story by Jorge Luis Borges in Ficciones
- The End, a novel in the series My Struggle by Karl Ove Knausgård

== Music ==
=== Bands ===
- The End (UK band), a 1965–1970 British psychedelic-pop band
- The End (Canadian band), a 1999–2007 mathcore band
- The End Band, an Austrian pop band formed in 2009

=== Albums ===
- The E.N.D., by Black Eyed Peas, 2009
- The End (Cody Fry album) or the title song, 2023
- The End (Crack the Sky album), 1984
- The End (Forever in Terror album), 2009
- The End (Mammoth album) or the title song, 2025
- The End (Mika Nakashima album), 2006
- The End..., by Nico, 1974
- The End (EP), by Black Sabbath, 2016
- The End: Live in Birmingham, by Black Sabbath, 2017
- Chapter 1: The End, by Three 6 Mafia, or the title song, 1996
- The End, by Aina the End, 2021
- The End, by Gallhammer, 2011
- The End, by Melvins, 2008
- The End, by Shlohmo, 2019
- The End, by Spectre, 2000

=== Songs ===
- "The End" (Beatles song), 1969
- "The End" (The Doors song), 1967
- "The End" (Earl Grant song), 1958
- "The End" (Five Finger Death Punch song), 2022, re-recording with Babymetal, 2025
- "The End" (Groove Coverage song), 2003
- "The End" (Halsey song), 2024
- "The End" (Mammoth song), 2025
- "The End", by Alesso, 2021
- "The End", by Andrew F from Reckless Abandon, 2008
- "The End", by AP2 from Suspension of Disbelief, 2000
- "The End", by Attila from Rage, 2010
- "The End", by Behemoth from Thelema.6, 2000
- "The End", by Best Coast from Crazy for You, 2010
- "The End", by Bullet for My Valentine from The Poison, 2005
- "The End", by C418 from Minecraft - Volume Beta, 2013
- "The End", by Cane Hill from Too Far Gone, 2018
- "The End", by Celldweller from Soundtrack for the Voices in My Head Vol. 02, 2012
- "The End", by the Classic Crime from The Silver Cord, 2008
- "The End", by Cryptopsy from Once Was Not, 2005
- "The End", by Danny Brown from Stardust, 2025
- "The End", by Demon Hunter from Outlive, 2017
- "The End", by Derek Webb from The Ringing Bell, 2007
- "The End", by Dirty South, 2008
- "The End", by Discharge from Hear Nothing See Nothing Say Nothing, 1982
- "The End", by DMA's from For Now, 2018
- "The End", by Ellie Goulding from Bright Lights, 2010
- "The End", by Feeder from Renegades, 2010
- "The End", by Fitz and the Tantrums from More Than Just a Dream, 2013
- "The End", by Got7 from Spinning Top, 2019
- "The End?", by Iced Earth from Plagues of Babylon, 2014
- "The End", by In Fear and Faith from Your World on Fire, 2009
- "The End", by Justice from Hyperdrama, 2024
- "The End", by Ken Carson from X, 2022
- "The End", by Kid Cudi from Man on the Moon II: The Legend of Mr. Rager, 2010
- "The End", by Kings of Leon from Come Around Sundown, 2010
- "The End", by Laleh from Me and Simon, 2009
- "The End", by Lil Uzi Vert from Pink Tape, 2023
- "The End", by Little Mix from Get Weird, 2015
- "The End", by Magdalena Bay from Mercurial World, 2021
- "The End", by Mayday Parade from Anywhere but Here, 2009
- "The End", by McFly from Radio:Active, 2008
- "The End", by MisterWives from Superbloom, 2020
- "The End", by Mr. Oizo from Moustache (Half a Scissor), 2005
- "The End", by Mutiny Within from God of War: Blood & Metal, 2010
- "The End.", by My Chemical Romance from The Black Parade, 2006
- "The End", by Neil Cicierega from Mouth Moods, 2017
- "The End", by Pearl Jam from Backspacer, 2009
- "The End", by Ryan Adams from Jacksonville City Nights, 2005
- "The End", by Saves the Day from Sound the Alarm, 2006
- "The End", by Shakespears Sister from Hormonally Yours, 2022 re-release
- "The End", by Silverstein from A Shipwreck in the Sand, 2009
- "The End", by Simple Plan from Simple Plan, 2008
- "The End", by Symposium, 1998
- "The End", by Tom Odell from Black Friday, 2024
- "The End", by While She Sleeps from Sleeps Society, 2021
- "The End", by White Lies from As I Try Not to Fall Apart, 2022
- "The End (Music for Cars)", by the 1975 from Notes on a Conditional Form, 2020
- "The Ends", by Travis Scott from Birds in the Trap Sing McKnight, 2016

=== Other uses in music ===
- The End Records, an American record label
- The End Tour, a 2016 Black Sabbath tour

== Radio stations ==
- KZND-FM (94.7 The End), Anchorage, Alaska
- KUDL (106.5 The End), Sacramento, California
  - KDND, a former radio station in Sacramento, California at 107.9 that also carried "The End" branding from 1998 to 2017
- WEND (106.5 The End), Charlotte, North Carolina
- KHTB (formerly KENZ, 101.9 The End), Salt Lake City, Utah
- KNDD (107.7 The End), Seattle, Washington

== Television ==
=== Episodes ===
- "The End" (12 Monkeys), 2018
- "The End" (Absolutely Fabulous), 1995
- "The End" (Agents of S.H.I.E.L.D.), 2018
- "The End" (The Amazing World of Gumball), 2011
- "The End" (American Horror Story), 2018
- "The End?" (Baywatch), 1990
- "The End" (Curb Your Enthusiasm), 2005
- "The End" (Entourage), 2011
- "The End" (Fallout), 2024
- "The End" (The Ghost and Molly McGee), 2024
- "The End" (The Goodies), 1975
- "The End" (Grimm), 2017
- "The End" (Lost), 2010
- "The End" (Meta Runner), 2022
- "The End" (Power Rangers), 2023
- "The End" (Red Dwarf), 1988
- "The End" (Supernatural), 2009
- "The End" (Teen Titans), 2005
- "The End" (The X-Files), 1998

=== Other uses in television ===
- The End (Australian TV series), a 2020 drama series
- The End (Brazilian TV series), a 2023 drama series
- The End (Egyptian TV series), a 2020 science fiction series
- The End (Irish TV programme), a 1993–1996 comedy programme
- NXT TakeOver: The End, a 2016 professional wrestling show and WWE Network event

== Other uses ==
- The End (club), a former nightclub in the West End of London
- The End (sculpture), a sculpture by Heather Phillipson
- The End, a Ty Beanie Baby bear believed to signal the retirement of all Beanies

== See also ==
- End (disambiguation)
- End of the world (disambiguation)
- In the End (disambiguation)
- This Is the End, a 2013 American comedy film
