= Omega Point (disambiguation) =

Omega Point is an idea in philosophy (eschatology) advanced by Pierre Teilhard de Chardin.

Omega Point may also refer to:

- Omega Point (album), an album by Spear of Destiny
- An idea in cosmology advanced by mathematical physicist Frank J. Tipler
- Omega point (geometry), a boundary point in hyperbolic geometry
- Point Omega, a 2010 novel by Don DeLillo
- The Omega Point, a series of space opera novellas by George Zebrowski
- The Omega Point: Beyond 2012, a novel by Whitley Strieber
- "Omega Point", a track by Apollo 440 from their album Millennium Fever
- Omega Point, a fictional brand of detergent sold at Omega Mart
