= Full Frontal =

Full Frontal may refer to:

- Full Frontal (play), a 1979 play by Michael Hastings
- Full Frontal (Australian TV series), an Australian sketch comedy series which debuted in 1993
- Full Frontal (film), a 2002 film by Steven Soderbergh
- Full frontal nudity as a state of nudity in general
- Full Frontal with Samantha Bee, an American news satire series on TBS
- Full Frontal, a 2001 film by Kyle Schickner
- Full Frontal, a character from Mobile Suit Gundam Unicorn
- "Full Frontal Nudity", the eighth episode of the first series of Monty Python's Flying Circus
