= Omega (Leonard novel) =

1986 novel by Raymond Leonard

Omega is a novel by Raymond Leonard published in 1986.

== Plot summary ==
Omega is a novel in which the human race builds a super-computer of the same name to fix all of their problems.

== Reception ==
Dave Langford reviewed Omega for White Dwarf #83, and stated that "It takes endless pages of dreadful portentiousness and worse dialogue to reach the timeworn punchline of Fredric Brown's one-pager, which (as every fan knows) goes 'Yes, now there is a God!'"

== Reviews ==
- Review by Keith Freeman (1987) in Vector 136
