= The End (role-playing game) =

Tabletop horror role-playing game

The End is a role-playing game published by Scapegoat Games in 1995.

Cover art, 1995

== Gameplay ==
The End, designed by Joseph Donka, Dan Woodward and Reid San Filippo is a self-described "theological horror" role-playing game that uses traditional Christian apocalyptic symbology in an irreverent setting based on the biblical apocalypse. Players take on the roles of characters who have either ended up in Heaven or in Hell following Armageddon.

For character generation, the game employs rules for character abilities and skills similar to Dungeons & Dragons.

== Controversy ==
The irreverent use of Christian symbols and terminology resulted in some controversy. In the 2014 book Designers & Dragons: The '90s, Shannon Appelcine recalled that the game was banned at Gencon — then owned by TSR, Inc. — which "resulted in Scapegoat staff marching outside Gen Con with placards saying 'The End Is HERE!,' offering another example of censorship being the best marketing."

== Reception ==
In the September 1997 edition of Dragon (Issue #239), Rick Swan noted that "If we gave points here at Review Central for irreverence, this over-the-top RPG of 'theological horror' would score a perfect 10." But Swan had some reservations. "Is it fun? Let me put it this way: after an afternoon of End-inspired fun, it took an evening of Barney reruns to restore my spiritual balance." Swan concluded that there might be an audience for the game, saying, "Recommended for the courageous, the broad-minded, and those comfortable with sentences like: 'Q: Is there any kind of afterlife for the Meek? A: No. After life, you rot.'"

== Reviews ==
- Review in Shadis #23
- Alarums & Excursions (Issue 258 - Feb 1997)
