= OMEGA process =

Ethylene glycol production method

The OMEGA process ("Only MEG Advantage") is a chemical process discovered by the Shell Global Solutions company that is used to produce ethylene glycol from ethylene. This process comprises two steps, the controlled oxidation of ethylene to ethylene oxide, and the net hydrolysis of ethylene oxide to monoethylene glycol (MEG), mediated by catalytic carbon dioxide. The first chemical plant using the OMEGA process was started in South Korea. Subsequent OMEGA plants have been started in Saudi Arabia and Singapore. Shell claims that this process, compared to conventional ones, does not produce higher glycols, uses less steam and water, and generates less waste.

== Ethylene oxidation ==
To produce ethylene oxide, ethylene is oxidized with dioxygen in the presence of a silver catalyst. Some ethylene is over-oxidized to carbon dioxide and water, which is wasteful; early processes only gave ~ 65% selectivity for ethylene oxide as a result. In the OMEGA process, over-oxidation is reduced by including ethyl chloride as a moderator.

== Ethylene oxide hydrolysis ==
Conventionally, monoethylene glycol (HOC_{2}H_{4}OH) is produced by the controlled hydrolysis of ethylene oxide (C_{2}H_{4}O). The monoethylene glycol product is also able to react with ethylene oxide to give diethylene glycol, and so on; sequential reaction with ethylene oxide is how poly(ethylene glycol) is produced. Due to monoethylene glycol's high boiling point, purification by distillation is energy intensive.

C_{2}H_{4}O + H_{2}O → HOC_{2}H_{4}OH

In the OMEGA process, the ethylene oxide reacts with carbon dioxide (CO_{2}) to yield ethylene carbonate (C_{3}H_{4}O_{3}). Ethylene carbonate is subsequently hydrolyzed to monoethylene glycol and carbon dioxide. The carbon dioxide is released in this step again and can be fed back into the process circuit. This process is 99.5% selective for monoethylene glycol.

C_{2}H_{4}O + CO_{2} → C_{3}H_{4}O_{3}
C_{3}H_{4}O_{3} + H_{2}O → HOC_{2}H_{4}OH + CO_{2}

This part of the OMEGA process was originally developed by Mitsubishi Chemicals, and it has been exclusively licensed to Shell.

== See also ==
- Carbonate ester
