= Window deflector =

Automobile component protecting from rain

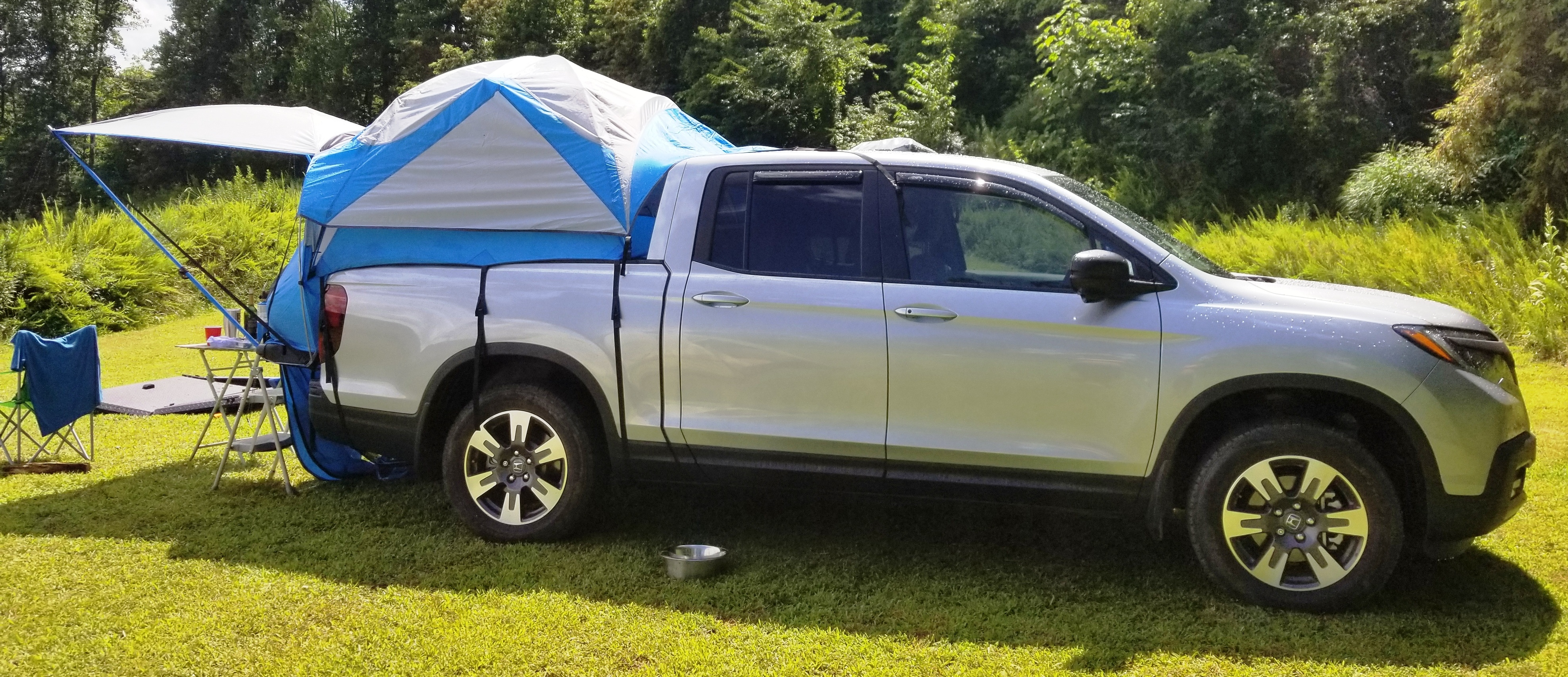
2017 Honda Ridgeline with AVS In-Channel Low Profile Ventvisors

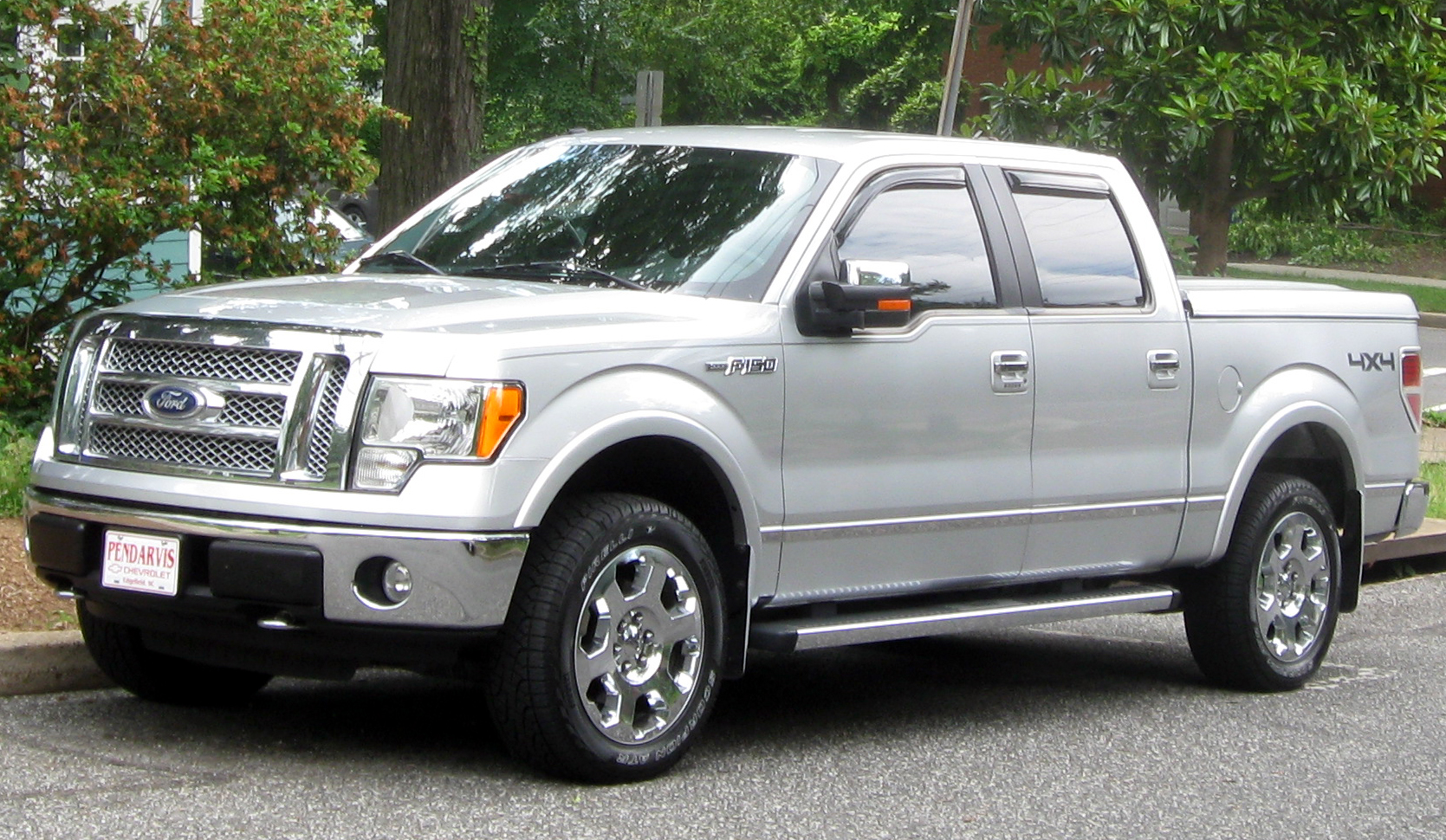
A pickup truck with deflectors on all door windows

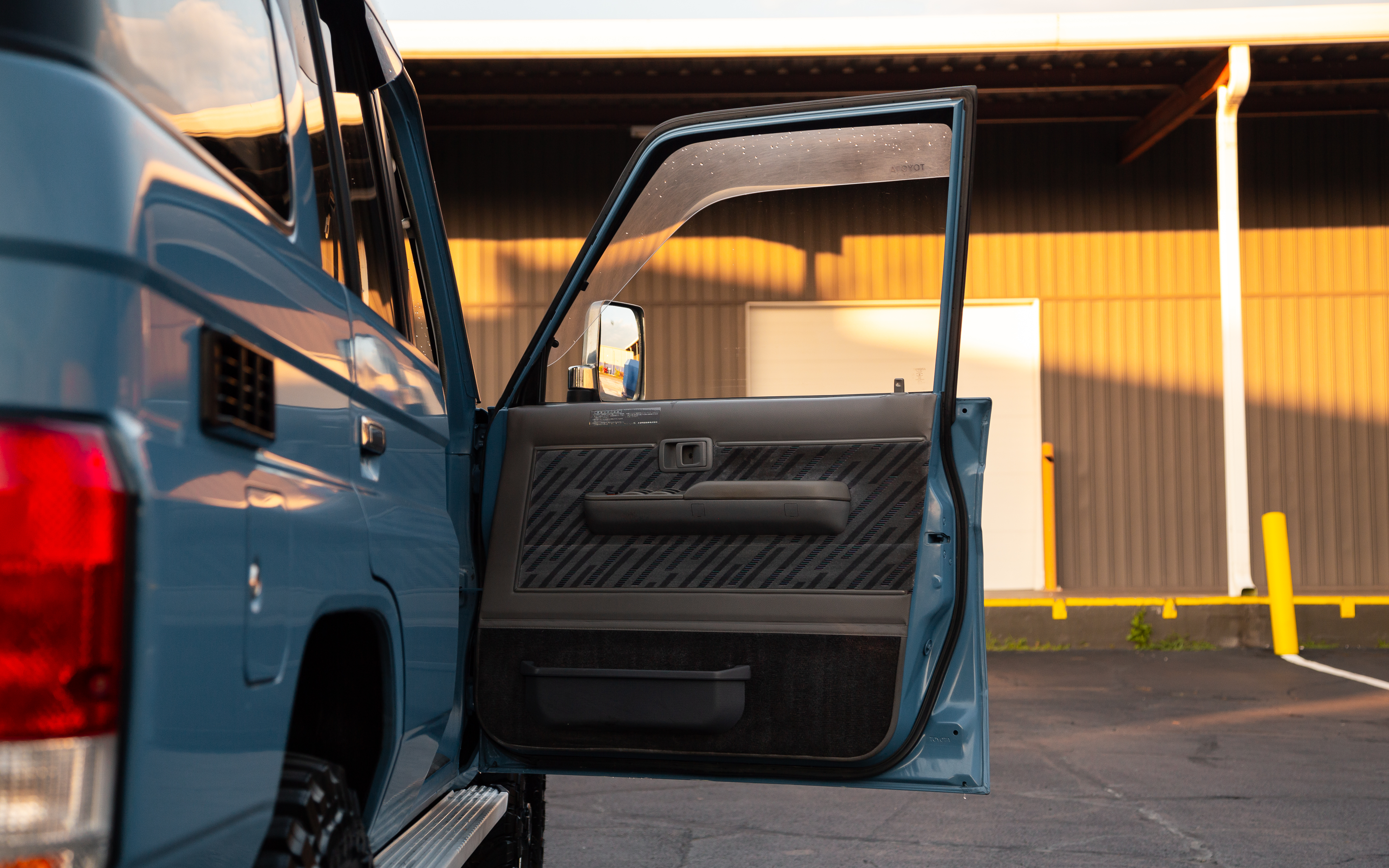
The original and branded deflector of the Toyota Land Cruiser KZJ78 that remains outside the passenger compartment

A window deflector (also known as anti-turbulence air deflector, anti-turbo, air deflector or simply deflector) is a transparent plastic fitting, fairing, or accessory, which can be mounted above the doors of vehicles, such as cars or trucks, to protect the interior from rain or other precipitation in case of slightly opened windows.

Deflectors may also be fitted to sunroofs to change the flow of air and reduce turbulence generated by the vehicle, in order to obtain specific advantages depending on the type of application. If applied to openings of the cabin, it allows improved driving comfort and reduced noise.

== Description and function ==
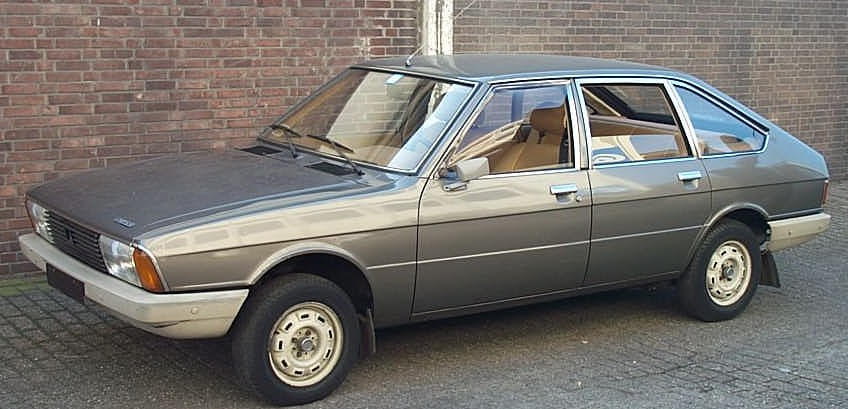
Simca 1307 with very large anti-turbulence air deflectors

Deflectors can be supplied as official accessories, generally branded, or as third-party components.

Openings of passenger compartments, such as windows, sunroofs and some convertible roof systems, when fitted with air deflectors provide improved comfort thanks to noise reduction of up to 11–12 decibels with windows open and 5 decibels with windows closed. Moreover, according to experimental tests performed on scaled models, lateral deflectors such as those applied to the window frame allow a reduction of the aerodynamic drag coefficient by 4–6%.

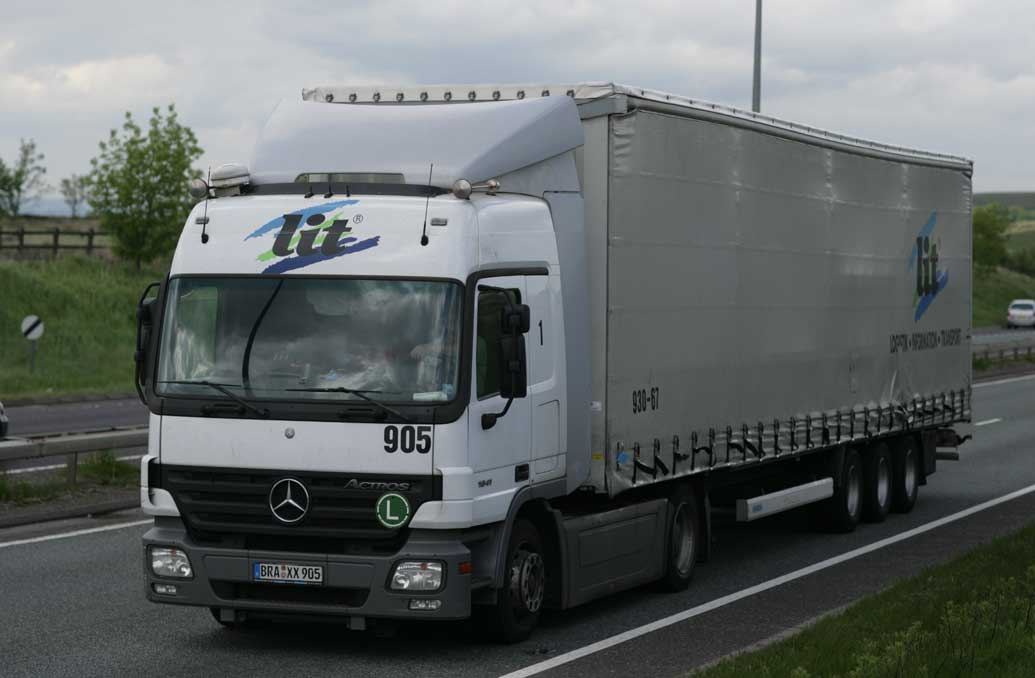
The adjustable air deflector located at the top of the cab of an articulated truck and fixed deflectors on the sides of the cab

In vehicles with overhangs, such as some articulated trucks or trucks with tall cargo bodies, the air deflector may be present on the top of the cab (possibly of the collapsible type to adapt to different overhangs, but also for driving without a semi-trailer) or also on the sides; it improves the shape factor and reduces aerodynamic drag (impact with air), especially at high speed, making it possible to reduce fuel consumption.

== Applications ==
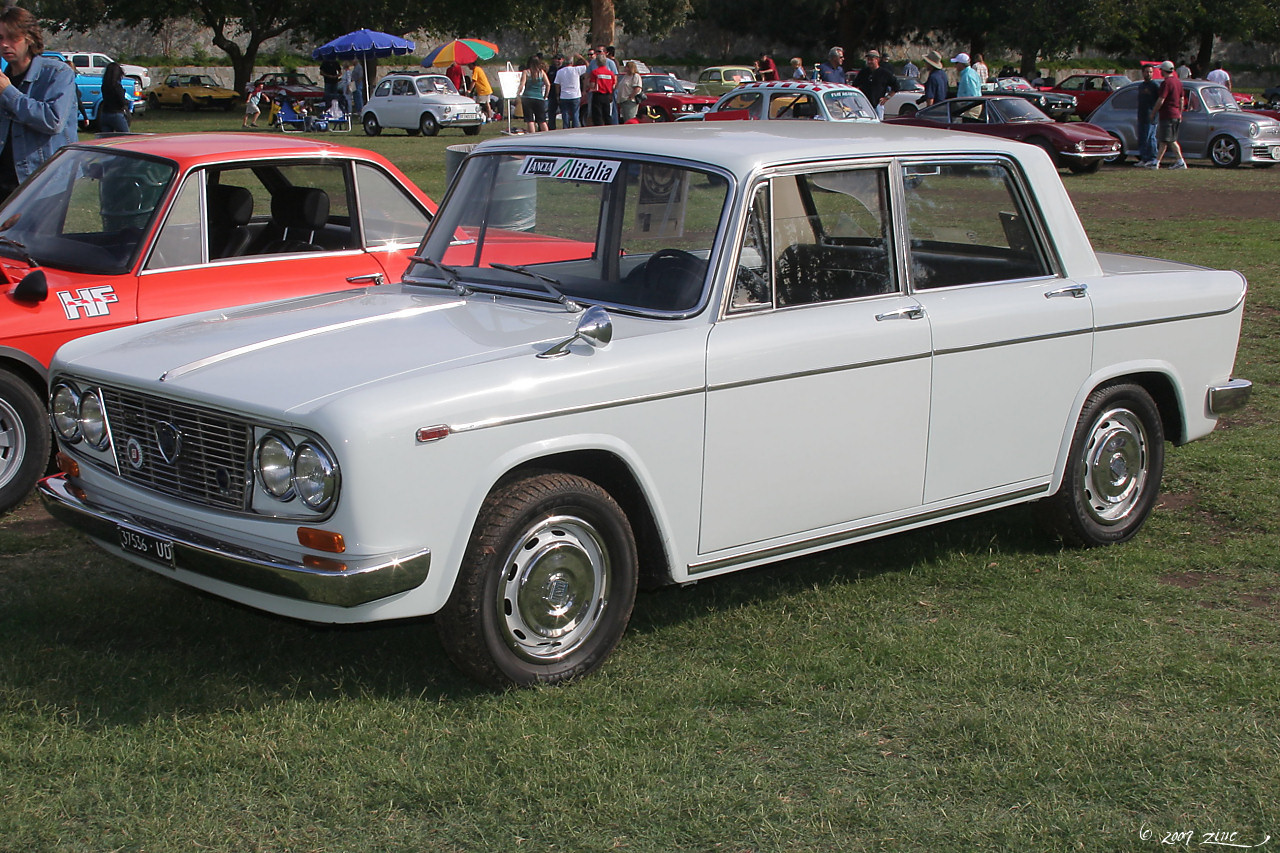
The deflector of the Lancia Fulvia that remains inside the passenger compartment

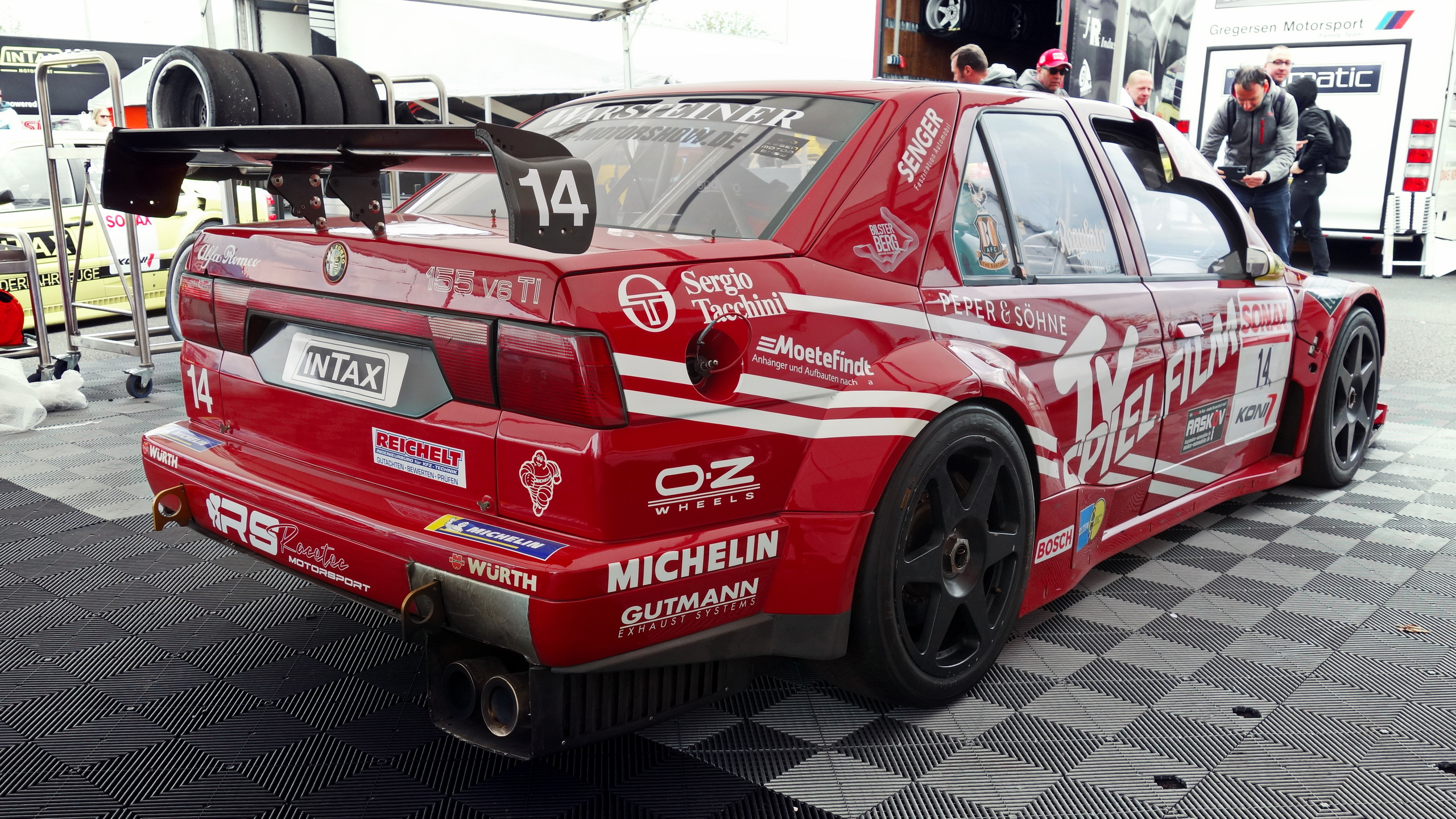
The purely aerodynamic deflector of the Alfa Romeo 155 V6 TI

The air deflector was used in competitive motorsport, as in the case of the Alfa Romeo 155 V6 TI, which introduced the solution disguising it as an accessory rear-view mirror.

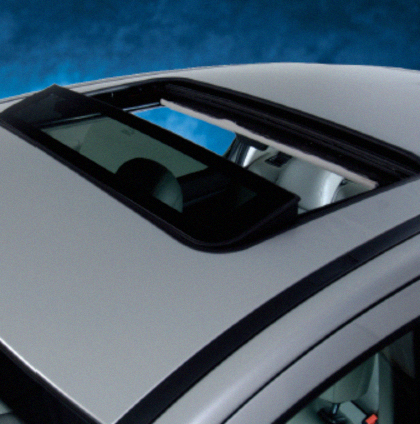
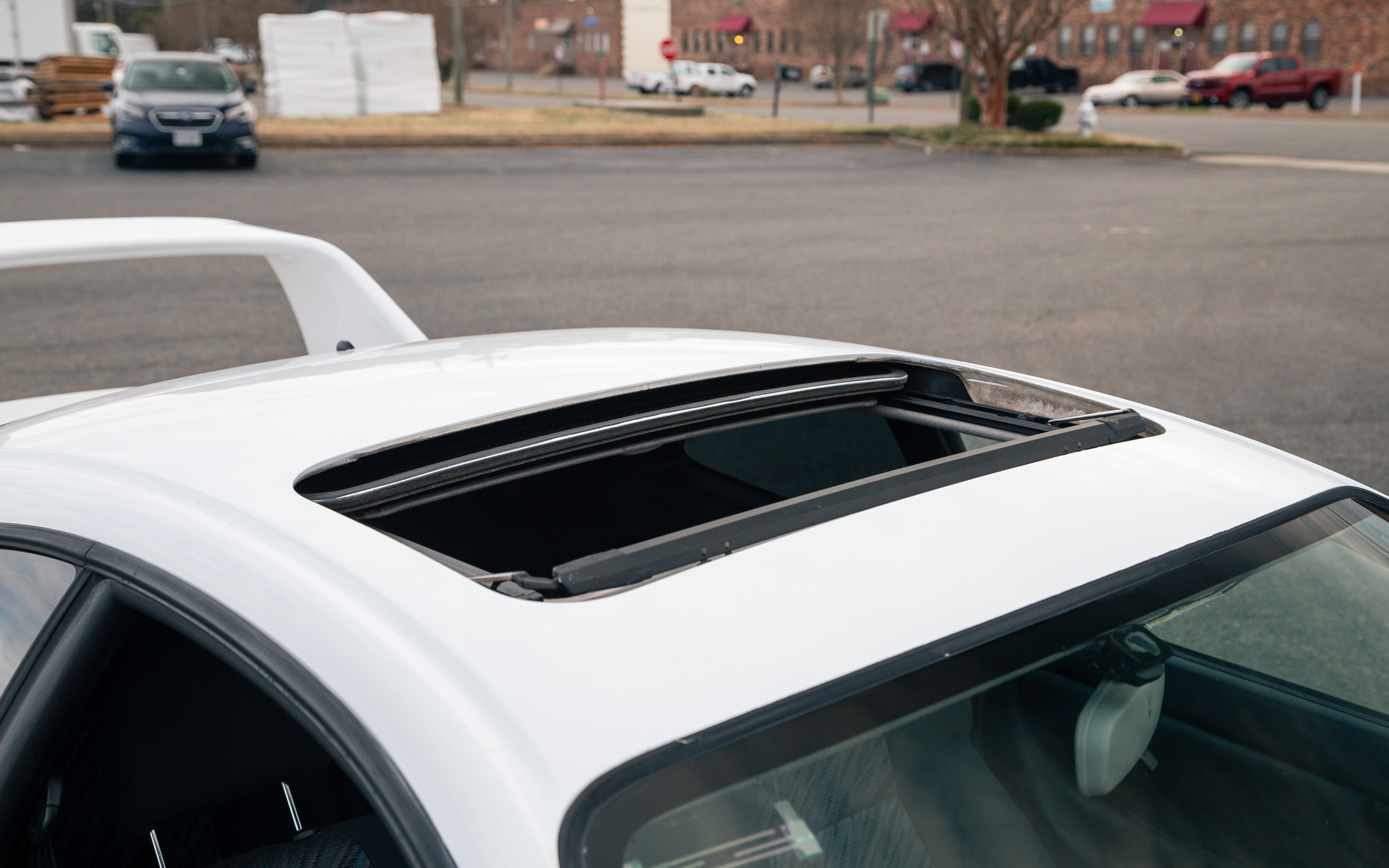
Sunroofs with different air deflector solutions

With regard to vehicles with convertible roofs, a wind blocker is generally used, which consists of a vertical mesh element (similar to coarse fabric mesh) positioned behind the headrests of the driver and front passenger seats. This element may be combined with or composed of a second horizontal element covering the rear part of the passenger compartment. However, there are also solutions based on deflectors (which may assume various shapes and designs), as in the case of the Ferrari Roma Spider, where the deflector partially closes the rear part of the passenger compartment (losing the possibility of using the rear seats) and prevents air from entering the lower part of the compartment.

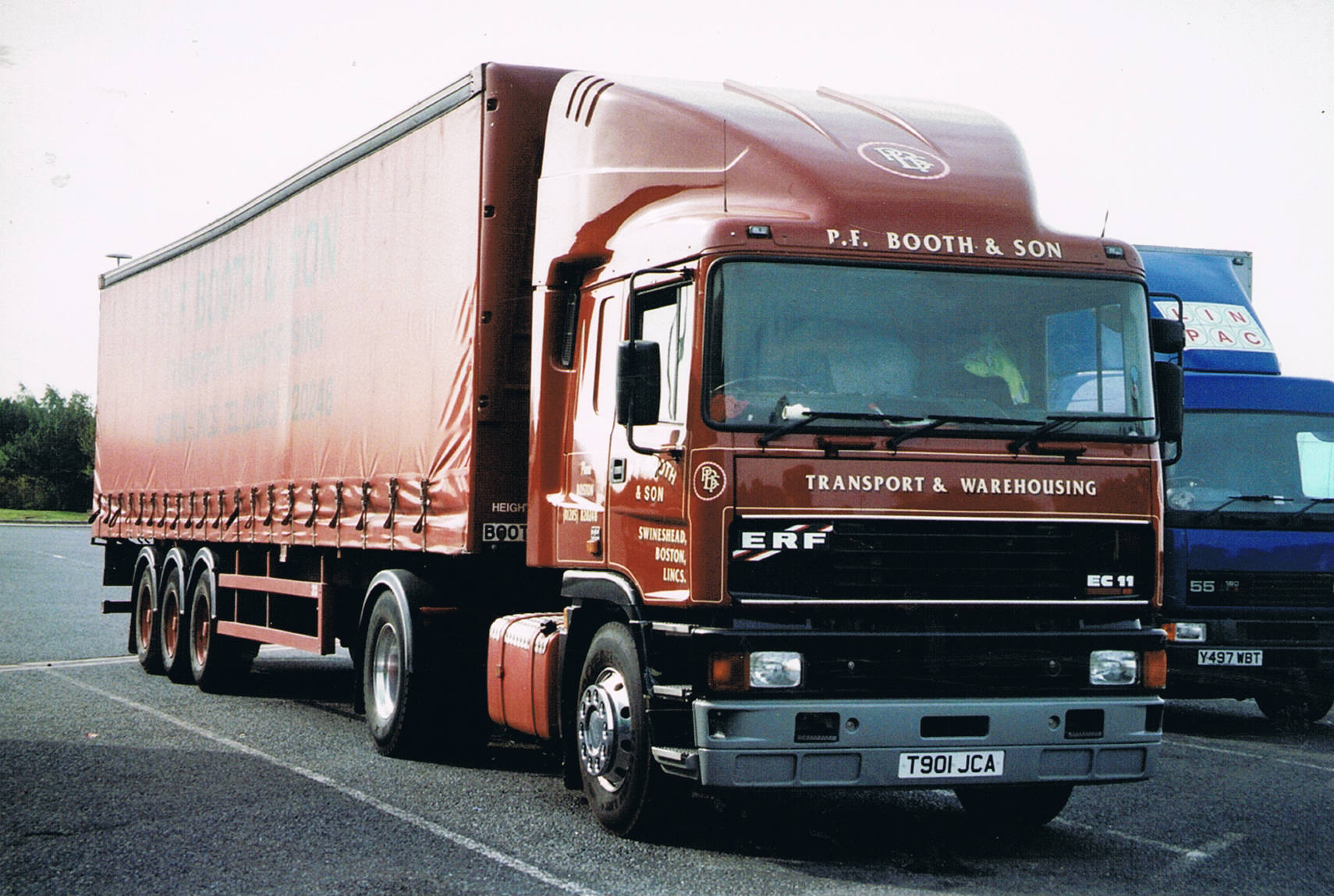
The deflector on the upper part and sides of the cab of an articulated truck

The use of air deflectors is widely employed in commercial vehicles, particularly on tractors, especially when fitted with semi-trailers. Their use is also present on trucks equipped with cargo compartments higher than the cab. The use of an air deflector allows reduction of aerodynamic drag, particularly at high speed, enabling lower transport costs because fuel consumption is reduced, which also allows a reduction in pollutant emissions.
In some cases their use is also extended to the rear part of the trailer or cargo compartment, allowing further improvement in aerodynamic performance.

== Types ==
Based on the way wind deflectors are installed, they may be classified as follows:

=== In-Channel ===
Installed into the upper window channel and kept in place due to tension; sometimes an additional thin strip of adhesive tape is used.

=== Stick-on ===
The deflector has a strip of self-adhesive tape for mounting. This allows mounting a deflector above the window, to either the window frames, or the roof if the windows are frameless.

== Similar equipment ==
=== Hood protector ===
A hood protector or bug guard is a similar product for protecting the paintwork on the front of the vehicle against insects.

=== Rear window louvers ===
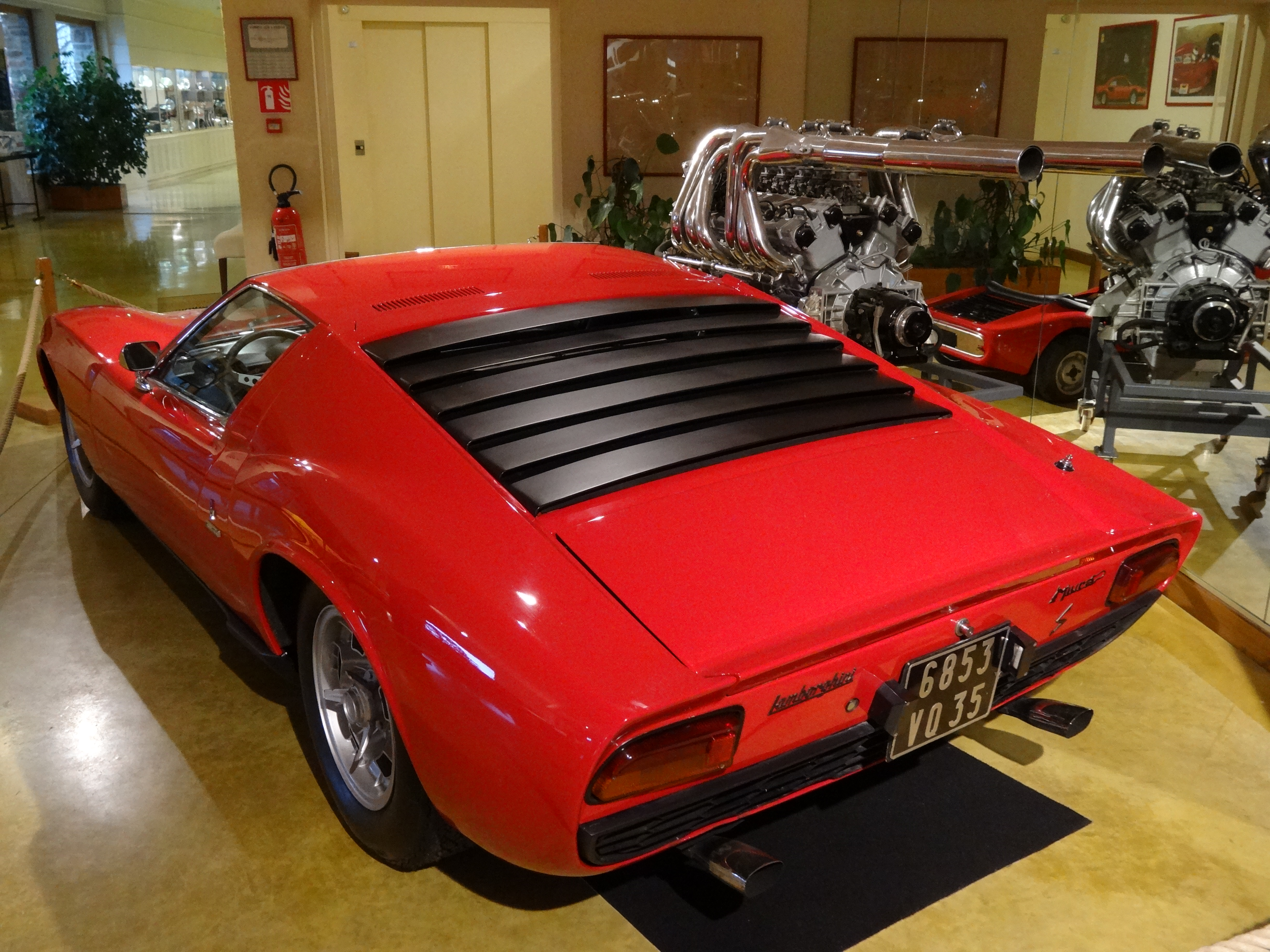
Rear window louvers on a 1970 Lamborghini Miura

A Rear window louver or rear window blind (German: Heckjalousie or Heckscheibenjalousie) is a type of window blind mounted to the rear window of a car. It is intended to protect the window from dirt and restrict sunlight from entering through the rear window to reduce heat. Rear window louvers have been criticized by some reviewers as a fashion phenomena, with little practical use.

== See also ==
- Vehicle window
- Side skirt
- Recreational vehicle
