= End =

End, END, Ending, or ENDS may refer to:

== End ==
=== Mathematics ===
- End (category theory), a transformation
- End (topology), a part of a topological space
- End (graph theory), a direction of an infinite graph; can be applied to group theory
- End (endomorphism), the set of all endomorphisms of something

=== Sports and games ===
- End (gridiron football), a player position
- End, a division of play in the sports of curling, target archery and pétanque
- End (dominoes), one of the halves of the face of a domino

=== Arts and entertainment ===
==== Music ====
- End (band), an American hardcore punk supergroup
- End Records, a record label
- "End", a song by The Cure from Wish
- "Ends" (song) a 1998 song by Everlast, off the album Whitey Ford Sings the Blues
- End (album), by Explosions in the Sky

==== Other arts and media ====
- End, in weaving, a single thread of the warp
- Ends (short story collection), a 1988 anthology book of Gordon R. Dickson stories
- End Poem, a narrative written by Julian Gough for Minecraft
- "Ends" (Ballers), a 2015 television episode
- "Ends" (Spaced), a 1999 television episode

=== Other uses ===
- End key, a cursor key on many computer keyboards

== END ==
- European Nuclear Disarmament
- Endoglin, a glycoprotein
- Equivalent narcotic depth, a concept used in underwater diving
- Environmental noise directive

== Ending ==
- Ending (linguistics), a linguistic morpheme
- End of a part of a baseball game
- Chess endgame
- Ending credits
  - Post-credits scene
- False ending
- Happy ending
- Twist ending
- Ending, a 1974 novel by Hilma Wolitzer
- Endings (film), a 2012 film
- The Ending (Song), a song by Ellie Goulding off the 2012 album Halcyon
- "Ending", a song by Jay Chou from the 2007 album Secret
- "The Ending", a song by Bill Wurtz
- This Ending (band) Swedish extreme metal band
- A repeat sign, in music theory
- "Endings", a Series E episode of the television series QI (2007)

== ENDS ==
- ENDS, electronic nicotine delivery system

== See also ==
- The End (disambiguation)
- Telos (philosophy), a goal or final state
- Conclude (disambiguation)
- End of the world (disambiguation)
- Finale (disambiguation)
- Front end (disambiguation)
- Terminate (disambiguation)
- Death (disambiguation)
- Demolition (disambiguation)
- Omega (disambiguation)
