= List of possible impact structures on Earth =

This list includes potential but unconfirmed structures that are not listed on the Earth Impact Database list of confirmed impact structures. For confirmed impact structures, see List of impact structures on Earth.

== List of confirmed and possible impact structures ==
The following tables list geological features on Earth that are possible impact events, but for which there is currently no confirming scientific evidence in the peer-reviewed literature. In order for a structure to be confirmed as an impact crater, it must meet a stringent set of well-established criteria. Some proposed impact structures are likely to eventually be confirmed, whereas others are likely to be shown to have been misidentified (see below). Recent extensive surveys have been done for Australian (2005), African (2014), and South American (2015) craters, as well as those in the Arab world (2016). A book review by A. Crósta and U. Reimold disputes some of the evidence presented for several of the South American structures.

Name	Location	Country	Diameter (km)	Age (Ma)	Confirmed	Notes	Image	Coordinates
38th Parallel structures	Missouri, etc.	United States	2-17	320 ± 10	2/7 confirmed			37.5°N 88.3°W; 37.8°N 90.2°W; 37.8°N 91.4°W; 37.9°N 92.7°W; 37.7°N 92.4°W; 38.0°N 93.6°W; 37.7°N 95.7°W
Ak-Bura (Murgab)	Tajikistan	Tajikistan	0.080	0.0003 (1700 AD)				38°5′38.5″N 74°16′58″E
Al Madafi	Tabuk	Saudi Arabia	6	6-66				28.67°N 37.18°E
Alamo bolide impact	Nevada	United States	100 ± 40	367		(Note: Shown as "proven" by Mikheeva (2017), not "confirmed" by EID (2018).)		37.31°N 116.18°W
Anféfis	Kidal	Mali	3.9	23?				18.072°N 0.048°W
Arganaty	Almaty Region	Kazakhstan	300	250				46.5°N 79.8°E
Arlit	Niger	Niger	10	?				21.353°N 9.145°E
Azuara	Aragon	Spain	35-40	30-40				41°07′N 0°13′W
Bajada del Diablo	Argentina	Argentina	40	0.45 ± 0.3				42°49′S 67°28′W
Bajo Hondo	Argentina	Argentina	3.9	<10				42.295454°S 67.924133°W
Bangui magnetic anomaly	Bangui	Central African Republic	600-800?	>542				6°N 18.3°E
Bateke Plateau	Gabon	Gabon	7.1	<2.6				0°38′45″S 14°27′29″E
Bedout	Australia (offshore)	Australia	250	250				18°S 119°E
Bee Bluff	Texas	United States	2.4	40?				29.03°N 99.85°W
Björkö	Björkö, Ekerö	Sweden	10	1200				59.30°N 17.60°E
Bloody Creek	Nova Scotia	Canada	40	?				44°45′N 65°14′W
Bohemian	Czech Republic	Czech Republic	260-300	>700?				50.0°N 14.7°E
Bow City	Alberta	Canada	8	70				50°25′N 112°16′W
Bowers	Antarctic Ocean (Ross Sea)		100	3-5				71.2°S 176°E
Brushy Creek Feature	Louisiana	United States	2.0	0.011–0.030				30.76°N 90.73°W
Bukit Bunuh	Perak	Malaysia	5–6	1.34–1.84				5.075°N 100.975°E
Burckle	Indian Ocean		30?	3000 BC				30.86°S 61.36°E
Catalina structures (Navy, Catalina, Emery Knoll)	Pacific Ocean (NE)		12, 32, 37	16-18				32.91°N 118.09°W
Cerro do Jarau	Paraná	Brazil	10	117				30°12′S 56°32′W
Charity Shoal	Ontario	Canada	1.2	<470				44°2′15″N 76°29′37″W
Corossol	Quebec	Canada	4	<470				50°03′N 66°23′W
Darwin Crater	Tasmania	Australia	1.2	0.816				42°19′S 145°40′E
Decorah	Iowa	United States	5.6	470				43°18′50″N 91°46′20″W
Deniliquin	New South Wales	Australia	520	400–500	No			35°32′0″S 144°58′0″E
Diamantina River ring feature	Queensland	Australia	120	300				22°09′S 141°54′E
Dumas magnetic anomaly	Saskatchewan	Canada	3.2	70 ± 5				49.92°N 102.12°W
Duolun	Inner Mongolia	China	120 ± 50	129 ± 3				42°3′N 116°15′E
El-Baz	Egypt	Egypt	4	?				24°12′N 26°24′E
Eltanin	Pacific Ocean (SE)		35?	2.5				57°47′S 90°47′W
Faya Basin	Chad	Chad	2	385 ± 15				18°10′N 19°34′E
Falkland Plateau anomaly	Atlantic Ocean (near Falkland Islands)		250-300	250				51°S 62°W
Fried Egg structure	Atlantic Ocean (near Azores)		6	17				36°N 27°W
Garet El Lefet	Libya	Libya	3	?				25.0°N 16.5°E
Gatun	Panama	Panama	3	20				09°05′58″N 79°47′22″W
General San Martín	Argentina	Argentina	11	1.2				38°0′S 63°18′W
Gnargoo	Western Australia	Australia	75	<300				24°48′24″S 115°13′29″E
Guarda Structure	Guarda	Portugal	30	200				40°38′N 07°06′W
Hartney anomaly	Manitoba	Canada	8	120 ± 20				49.4°N 100.67°W
Hico	Texas	United States	9	<60				32.01°N 98.03°W
Hotchkiss	Alberta	Canada	4	220 ± 100				57.539°N 118.878°W
Howell	Tennessee	United States	2.5	380 ± 10				35.23°N 86.61°W
Ibn-Batutah	Libya	Libya	2.5	120 ± 20				21°34′10″N 20°50′15″E
Ilumetsa	Põlva County	Estonia	0.08	0.0066 (<4600 BC)				57°57′N 27°24′E
Ishim	Akmola region	Kazakhstan	300	430-460				52°0′N 69°0′E
Iturralde	Bolivia	Bolivia	8.0	0.011–0.030				12°35′S 67°40′W
Jackpine Creek magnetic anomaly	British Columbia	Canada	25	120 ± 20				55.6°N 120.1°W
Jalapasquillo	Puebla	Mexico	1.2	<10				19.2231°N 97.429°W
Jebel Hadid	Libya	Libya	4.7	<66				20°52′12″N 22°42′18″E
Jeptha Knob	Kentucky	United States	4.3	425				38°11′N 85°07′W
Johnsonville	South Carolina	United States	11	300?				33°49′N 79°22′W
Jwaneng South	Botswana	Botswana	1.3	<66				24°42′S 24°46′E
Kebira	Gilf Kebir	Egypt	31	100				24°40′N 24°58′E
Kilmichael	Mississippi	United States	13	45				33.5°N 89.55°W
Krk	Croatia	Croatia	12	40				45.06°N 14.62°E
Kurai Basin	Altai Region	Russia	20	<200				50°12′N 87°54′E
La Dulce	Argentina	Argentina	2.8	0.445?				38.21°S 59.21°W
Labynkyr	Russia	Russia	67	150?				62.325°N 143.090°E
Lac Iro	Moyen-Chari	Chad	13	?				10°10′N 19°40′E
Lairg Gravity Low	Scotland	United Kingdom	40	1200				58°1′12″N 4°24′0″W
Lake Cheko	Siberia	Russia	0.5	0.0001 (1908 AD)				60.964°N 101.86°E
Lake Tai (Tai Hu)	Jiangsu	China	70 ± 5	365 ± 5				31°14′N 120°8′E
Loch Leven	Scotland	United Kingdom	18x8	290				56°12′N 3°23′W
Lorne Basin	New South Wales	Australia	30	250 ± 2				31.60°S 152.62°E
Lycksele 2	Sweden	Sweden	130	1500 ± 300				64.92°N 18.78°E
Madagascar 3	Madagascar	Madagascar	12	?				18.839°S 46.221°E
Magyarmecske anomaly	Hungary	Hungary	7	299				45.95°N 17.97°E
Mahuika	New Zealand (offshore)	New Zealand	20?	0.0006 (1400 AD)				48.3°S 166.4°E
Maniitsoq	Greenland	Greenland	100	3000				65°15′N 51°50′W
Mejaouda (El Mrayer)	Mauritania	Mauritania	3	<542?				22.722°N 7.312°W
Merewether	Newfoundland	Canada	0.192	0.0009 (1100 AD)				58.04°N 64.05°W
Meseta de la Barda Negra	Argentina	Argentina	1.5	4 ± 1				39°10′S 69°53′W
Middle-Urals Ring	Russia	Russia	400–550	>542				56°N 56°E
Mistassini-Otish	Quebec	Canada	600	2200				50.57°N 73.42°W
Mount Ashmore dome	Indian Ocean (in Timor Sea)		>50	35				12.55°S 123.2°E
Mousso	Borkou-Ennedi-Tibesti	Chad	3.8	<542				17°58′N 19°53′E
Mt. Oikeyama	Japan	Japan	90	0.030?				35.405°N 138.013°E
Mulkarra	South Australia	Australia	17	105				27.85°S 138.92°E
Nastapoka (Hudson Bay) arc	Quebec	Canada	450	1800?				57°00′N 78°50′W
Nadir	Atlantic Ocean (Guinea Plateau, West Africa)		≥8.5	66 ± 0.8				9.4°N 17.1°W
North Pole Crater	Pilbara Craton, Western Australia	Australia	100	3,470				21°02′54″S 119°23′35″E
Ouro Ndia	Mali	Mali	3	<2.6				14°59.8′N 4°30.0′W
Pantasma	Nicaragua	Nicaragua	10	?				13.37°N 85.95°W
Panther Mountain	New York	United States	10	375				42°03′N 74°24′W
Peerless	Montana	United States	6	470 ± 10				48.8°N 105.8°W
Piratininga	Paraná	Brazil	12	117				22°28′S 49°09′W
Praia Grande	Santos Basin, offshore	Brazil	20	84				25°39′S 45°37′W
Ramgarh	Rajasthan	India	3	?				25°20′16″N 76°37′29″E
Rochechouart impact structure	Rochechouart	France	23	206.9				45°49′27″N 0°46′54″E
Ross	Antarctic Ocean (Ross Sea)		600?	<38				77.5°S 178.5°E
Rubielos de la Cérida	Spain	Spain	80x40	30-40				40.783°N 1.25°W
Sakhalinka	Pacific Ocean (NW)		12	70				30°15′N 170°03′E
São Miguel do Tapuio	Piauí	Brazil	22	120				5°37.6′S 41°23.3′W
Shanghewan	Jilin	China	30	?				44°29′N 126°11′E
Shiva	Indian Ocean		500	66				18°40′N 70°14′E
Shiyli	Kazakhstan	Kazakhstan	5.5	46 ± 7				49°10′N 57°51′E
Silverpit	Atlantic Ocean (North Sea)		20	60 ± 15				54°14′N 1°51′E
Sirente	Abruzzo	Italy	10	0.0017 (320 ± 90 AD)				42°10′38″N 13°35′45″E
Sithylemenkat Lake	Alaska	United States	12	0.033?				66°07′34″N 151°23′20″W
Smerdyacheye Lake	Moscow Oblast	Russia	20	0.01–0.03?				55.735°N 39.823°E
Sudan 1 (Red Sea Hills)	Sudan	Sudan	6	?				17°57.1′N 37°56.1′E
Sudan 2 (Bayuda)	Sudan	Sudan	10	?			A map of Sudan showing three craters	18°03.5′N 33°30.2′E
Sudan 3 (Mahas)	Sudan	Sudan	2.8	?				20°01.9′N 30°13.7′E
Svetloyar Lake	Nizhy Novgorod	Russia	0.4	0.0026 (600 BC)				56.819°N 45.093°E
Takamatsu	Shikoku	Japan	4-8	15				34.3°N 134.05°E
Tarek	Gilf Kebir	Egypt	2.1	112?				24.601°N 27.205°E
Tatarsky North	Pacific Ocean (NW)		14	?				49°57′35″N 141°23′40″E
Tatarsky South	Pacific Ocean (NW)		20	?				48°17′38″N 141°23′40″E
Tefé River	Amazonas	Brazil	15	65 ± 20				4°57′S 66°03′W
Temimichat	Tiris Zemmour	Mauritania	0.7	2?				24°15′N 9°39′W
Tsenkher	Mongolia	Mongolia	3.6	5				43°38′41″N 98°22′09″E
Toms Canyon	New Jersey	United States	22	35				39°08′N 72°51′W
Velingara crater	Senegal	Senegal	48	23-40				13°02′N 14°08′W
Versailles	Kentucky	United States	1.5	<400				38.09°N 84.67°W
Vichada	Vichada	Colombia	50	30?				4°30′N 69°15′W
Victoria Island	California	United States	5.5	37-49				37.89°N 121.53°W
Warburton East	South Australia	Australia	200	300-360				28°S 140.5°E
Warburton West	South Australia	Australia	200	300-360				
Weaubleau (Weaubleau-Osceola)	Missouri	United States	19	330 ± 10				38.0°N 93.6°W
Wembo-Nyama Ring Structure	Eastern Kasai	DR Congo	36-46	60?				3°37′52″S 24°31′07″E
Wilkes Land 2	Antarctica		480	250-500				70°S 140°E
Woodbury	Georgia	United States	7	500 ± 100				32.92°N 84.55°W
Yallalie	Western Australia	Australia	12	99?				30°26′40″S 115°46′16″E
Zerelia West	Magnesia	Greece	20	0.0070 (5000 BC)				39°09′48″N 22°42′32″E
Zerelia East	Magnesia	Greece	10	0.0070 (5000 BC)				39°09′43″N 22°42′51″E

== Overview ==
Russia's Lake Cheko is thought by one research group to be the result of the famous Tunguska event, although sediments in the lake have been dated back more than 5,000 years. There is highly speculative conjecture about the supposed Sirente impact (c. 320 ± 90 AD) having caused the Roman emperor Constantine's vision at Milvian Bridge.

The Burckle crater and Umm al Binni structure are proposed to be behind the floods that affected Sumerian civilization. The Kachchh impact may have been witnessed by the Harappan civilization and mentioned as a fireball in Sanskrit texts.

Shortly after the Hiawatha Crater was discovered, researchers suggested that the impact could have occurred as late as ~12,800 years ago, leading some to associate it with the controversial Younger Dryas impact hypothesis (YDIH). James Kennett, a leading advocate of the YDIH said, "I'd unequivocally predict that this crater is the same age as the Younger Dryas."

These claims were criticised by other scholars. According to impact physicist Mark Boslough writing for Skeptical Inquirer the first reports of the impact released by science journalist Paul Voosen focused on this being a young crater which according to Boslough "set the tone for virtually all the media reporting to follow". Boslough argued, based on evidence and statistical probability, that once the crater has been drilled and researched "it will turn out to be much older." He complained that this important discovery "was tainted by connections to a widely discredited hypothesis and speculations that did not make it through peer review". The YDIH has since been refuted comprehensively by a team of earth scientists and impact experts.

A 2022 study using Argon–Argon dating of shocked zircon crystals in impact melt rocks found outwash less than 10 km downstream of the glacier pushed the estimate back to around 57.99 ± 0.54 million years ago, during the late Paleocene. Confirmation would require drilling almost one km (3,300 ft) through the ice sheet above the crater to obtain a sample of dateable, solidified impact melt from the crater.

The age of the Bloody Creek crater is uncertain.

As the trend in the Earth Impact Database for about 26 confirmed craters younger than a million years old shows that almost all are less than two km (1.2 mi) in diameter (except the three km (1.9 mi) Agoudal and four km (2.5 mi) Rio Cuarto), the suggestion that two large craters, Mahuika (20 km (12 mi)) and Burckle (30 km (19 mi)), formed only within the last few millennia has been met with skepticism. However, the source of the young (less than a million years old) and enormous Australasian strewnfield (c. 790 ka) is suggested to be a crater about 100 km (62 mi) across somewhere in Indochina, with Hartung and Koeberl (1994) proposing the elongated 100 km × 35 km (62 mi × 22 mi) Tonlé Sap lake in Cambodia (visible in the map at the side) as a suspect structure.

The Decorah crater has been conjectured as being part of the Ordovician meteor event.

Several twin impacts have been proposed, such as the Rubielos de la Cérida and Azuara (30–40 Ma), Cerro Jarau and Piratininga (c. 117 Ma), and Warburton East and West (300–360 Ma). However, adjacent craters may not necessarily have formed at the same time, as demonstrated by the case of the confirmed Clearwater East and West lakes.

Some confirmed impacts like Sudbury or Chicxulub are also sources of magnetic anomalies and/or gravity anomalies. The magnetic anomalies Bangui and Jackpine Creek, the gravity anomalies Wilkes Land crater and Falkland Islands, and others have been considered as being of impact origin. Bangui apparently has been discredited, but appears again in a 2014 table of unconfirmed structures in Africa by Reimold and Koeberl.

Several anomalies in Williston Basin were identified by Swatzky in the 1970s as astroblemes including Viewfield, Red Wing Creek, Eagle Butte, Dumas, and Hartney, of which only the last two are unconfirmed.

The Eltanin impact has been confirmed (via an iridium anomaly and meteoritic material from ocean cores) but, as it fell into the Pacific Ocean, apparently no crater was formed. The age of Silverpit and the confirmed Boltysh crater (65.17 ± 0.64 Ma), as well as their latitude, has led to the speculative hypothesis that there may have been several impacts during the KT boundary. Of the five oceans in descending order by area, namely the Pacific, Atlantic, Indian, Antarctic, and Arctic, only the smallest (the Arctic) does not yet have a proposed unconfirmed impact crater.

Craters larger than 100 kilometres (62 mi) in the Phanerozoic (after 541 Ma) are notable for their size as well as for the possible coeval events associated with them especially the major extinction events.

For example, the Ishim impact structure is conjectured to be bounded by the late Ordovician-early Silurian (c. 445 ± 5 Ma), the two Warburton basins have been linked to the Late Devonian extinction (c. 360 Ma), both Bedout and the Wilkes Land crater have been associated with the severe Permian–Triassic extinction event (c. 252 Ma), Manicouagan (c. 215 Ma) was once thought to be connected to the Triassic–Jurassic extinction event (c. 201 Ma) but more recent dating has made it unlikely, while the consensus is the Chicxulub impact caused the one for Cretaceous–Paleogene (c. 66 Ma).

However, other extinction theories employ coeval periods of massive volcanism such as the Siberian Traps (Permian-Triassic) and Deccan Traps (Cretaceous-Paleogene).

== Undiscovered but inferred ==
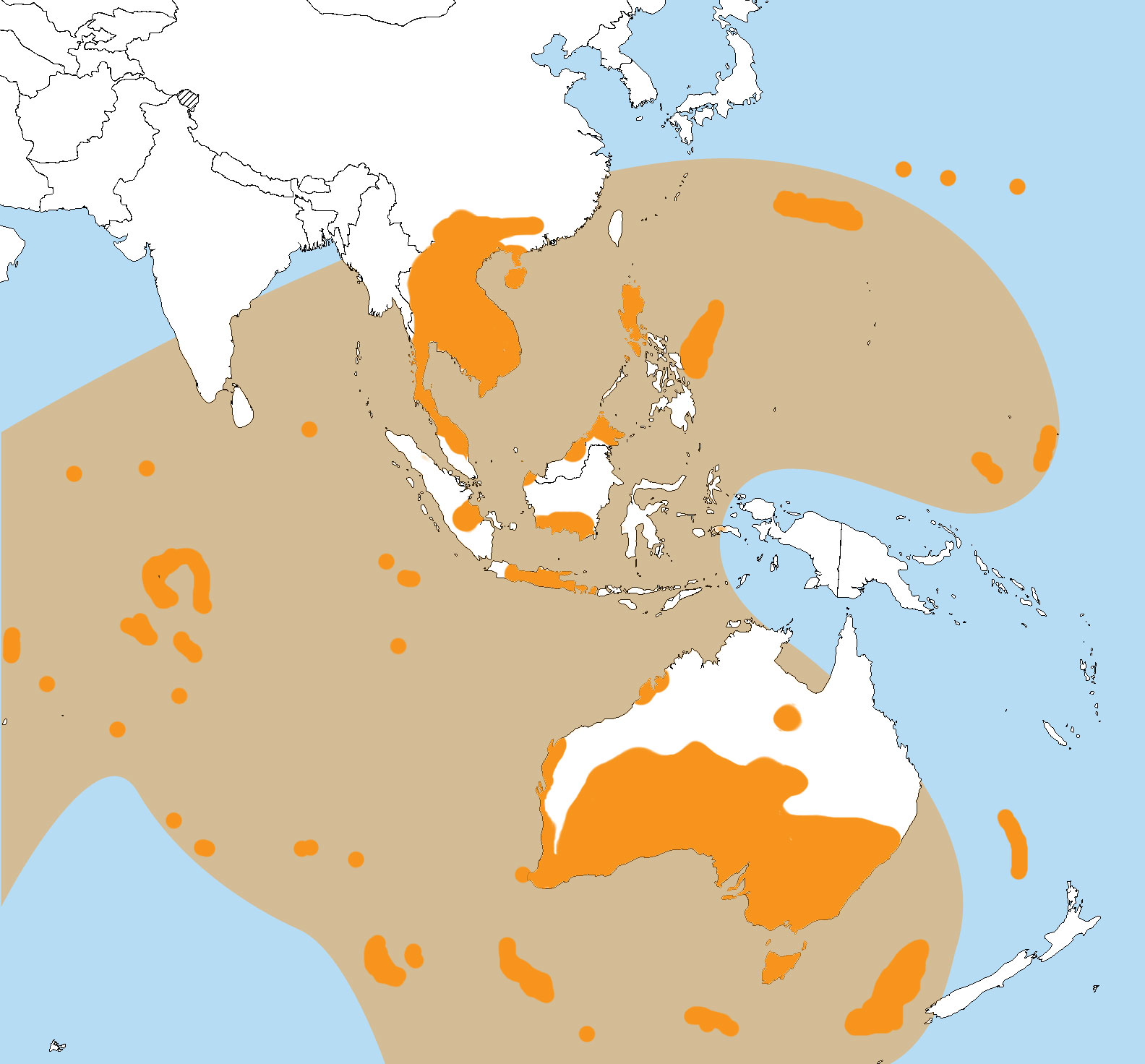
Australasian strewnfield. Shaded areas represent tektite finds.

There is geological evidence for impact events having taken place on Earth on certain specific occasions, which should have formed craters, but for which no impact craters have been found. In some cases this is because of erosion and Earth's crust having been recycled through plate tectonics, in others likely because exploration of the Earth's surface is incomplete, or because no actual crater was formed because the impacting object exploded as a cosmic air burst. Typically the ages are already known and the diameters can be estimated.

Parent crater of	Expected crater diameter	Age	Notes
Pica glass	Unknown	12 ka	
Libyan desert glass	Unknown	29 Ma	
Dakhleh glass	0.4 km	150 ka	
Argentinian impact glasses	Unknown	6, 114, and 445 ka; 5.3 and 9.2 Ma	
Australasian tektites	32–114 km	780 ka	
Central American tektites	14 km	820 ka	
Skye ejecta deposits	Unknown	60 Ma	
Stac Fada Member	40 km	1.2 Ga	
Barberton Greenstone Belt spherules	500 km	3.2 Ga	
Marble Bar impact spherules	"hundreds of kilometers"	3.4 Ga	
Kaveri Crater	120 km	800 to 550 Ma	

== Mistaken identity ==
Some geological processes can result in circular or near-circular features that may be mistaken for impact craters. Some examples are calderas, maars, sinkholes, glacial cirques, igneous intrusions, ring dikes, salt domes, geologic domes, ventifacts, tuff rings, forest rings, and others. Conversely, an impact crater may originally be thought as one of these geological features, like Meteor Crater (as a maar) or Upheaval Dome (as a salt dome).

The presence of shock metamorphism and shatter cones are important criteria in favor of an impact interpretation, though massive landslides (such as the Köfels landslide of 7800 BC which was once thought to be impact-related) may produce shock-like fused rocks called "frictionite".

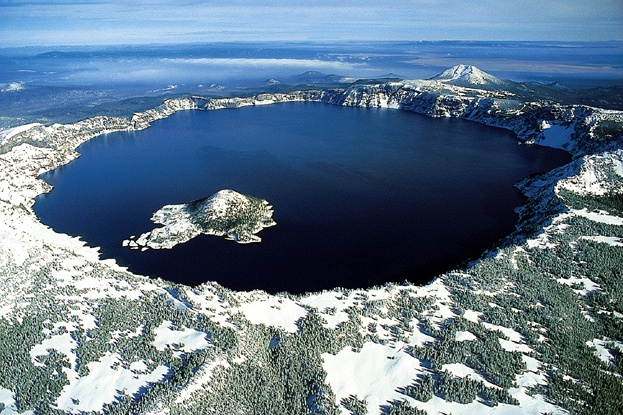
Crater Lake, Oregon (a caldera)

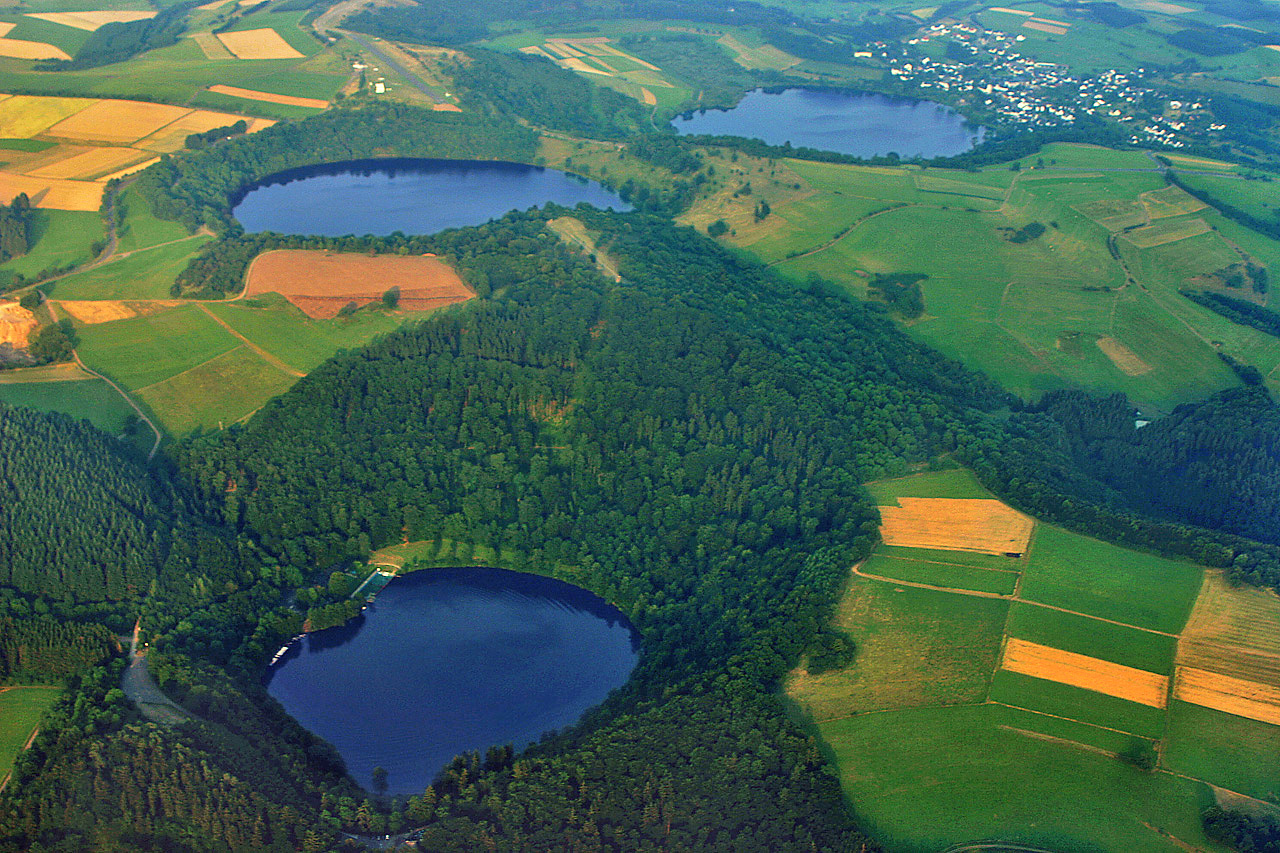
Three maars in Germany

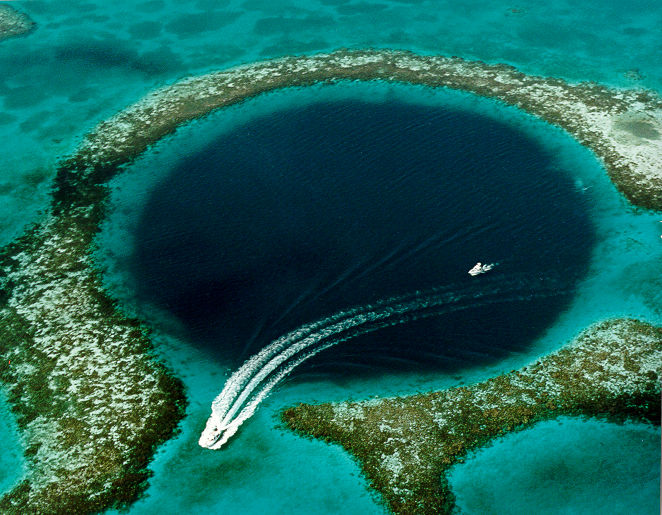
Great Blue Hole, Belize (a sinkhole)

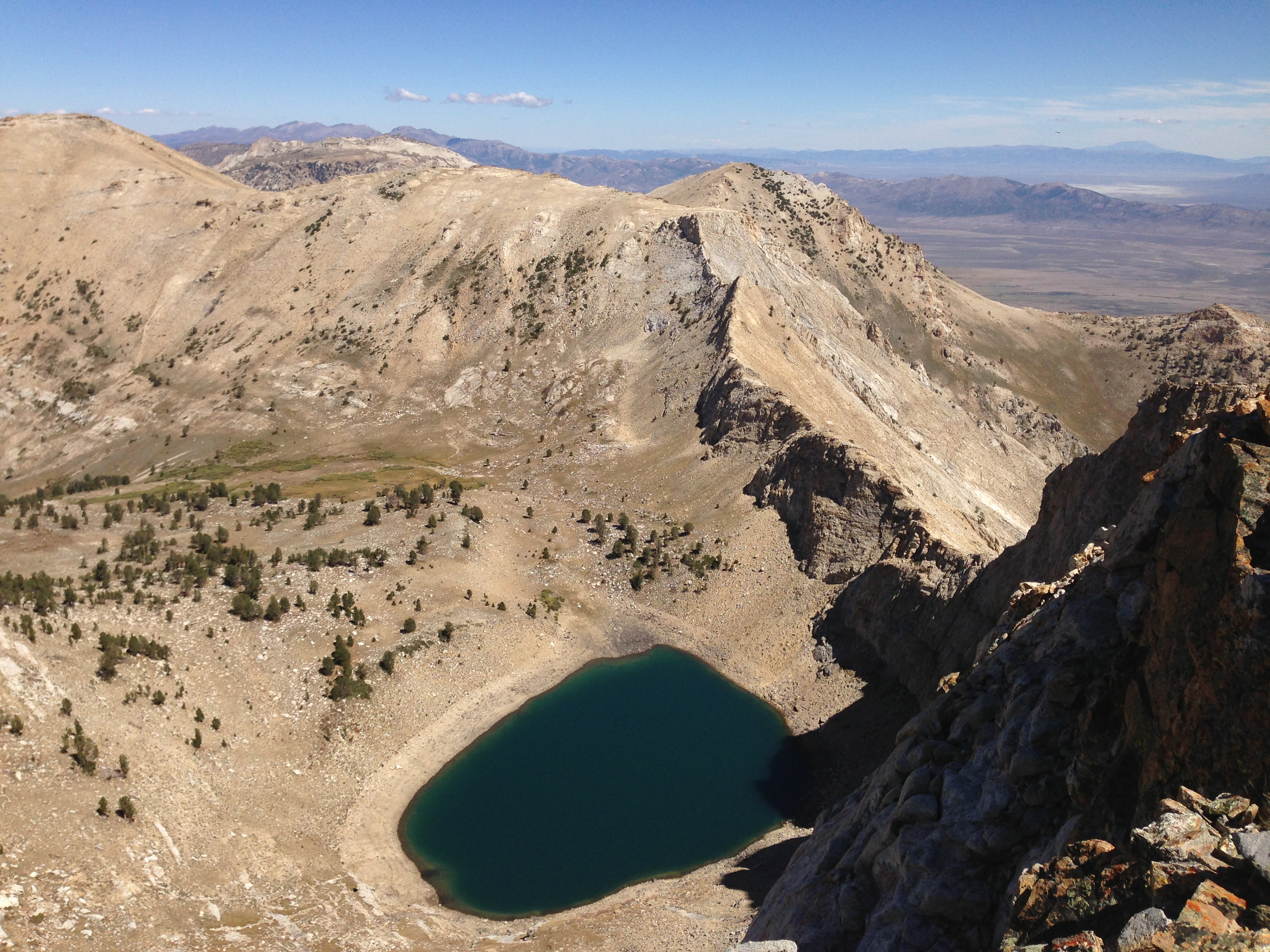
Verdi Lake (a glacial cirque)

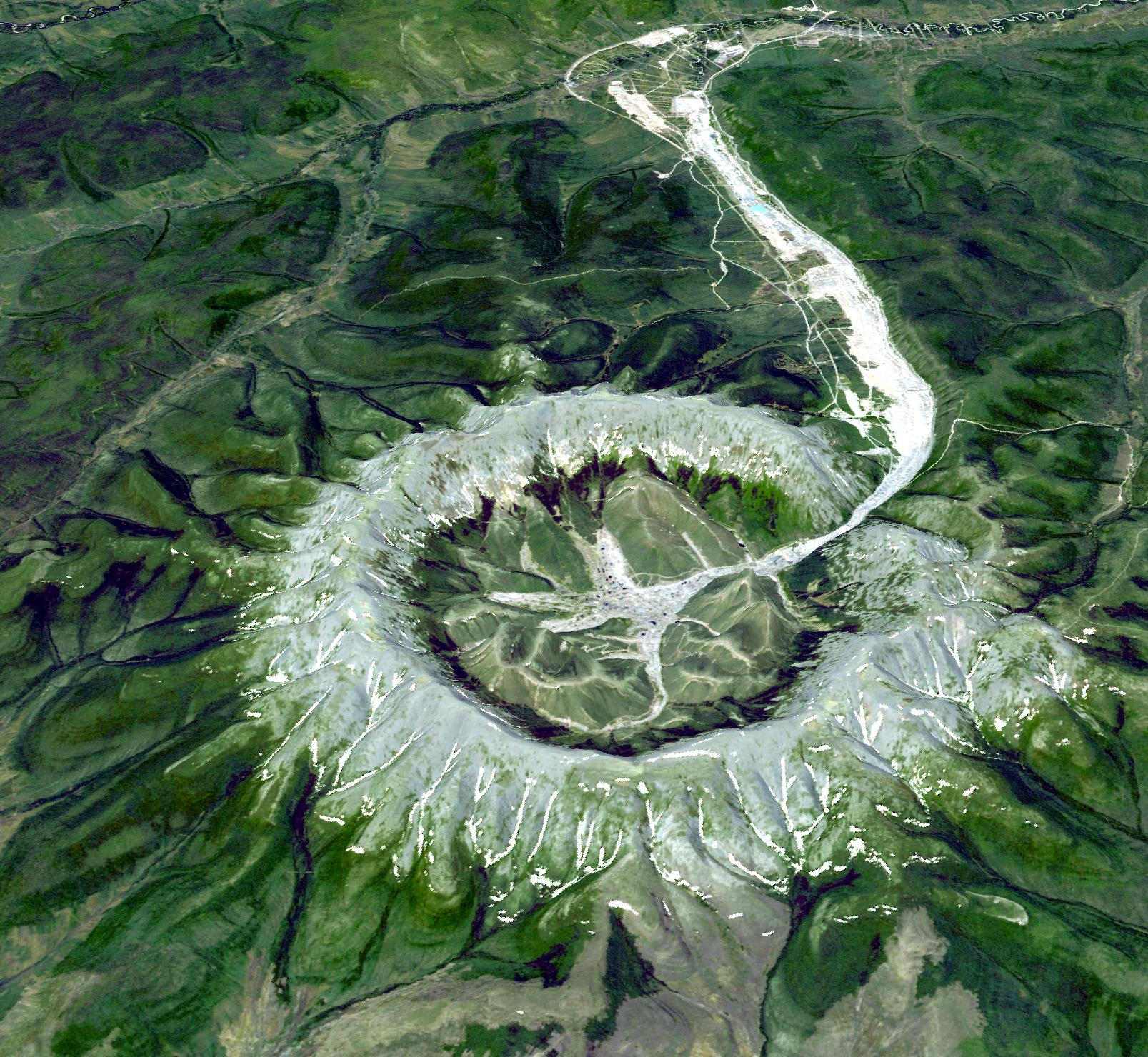
Kondyor Massif or Konder (an igneous intrusion)

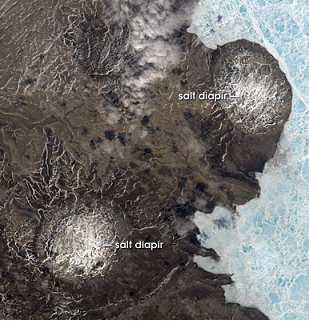
Salt domes on Melville Island

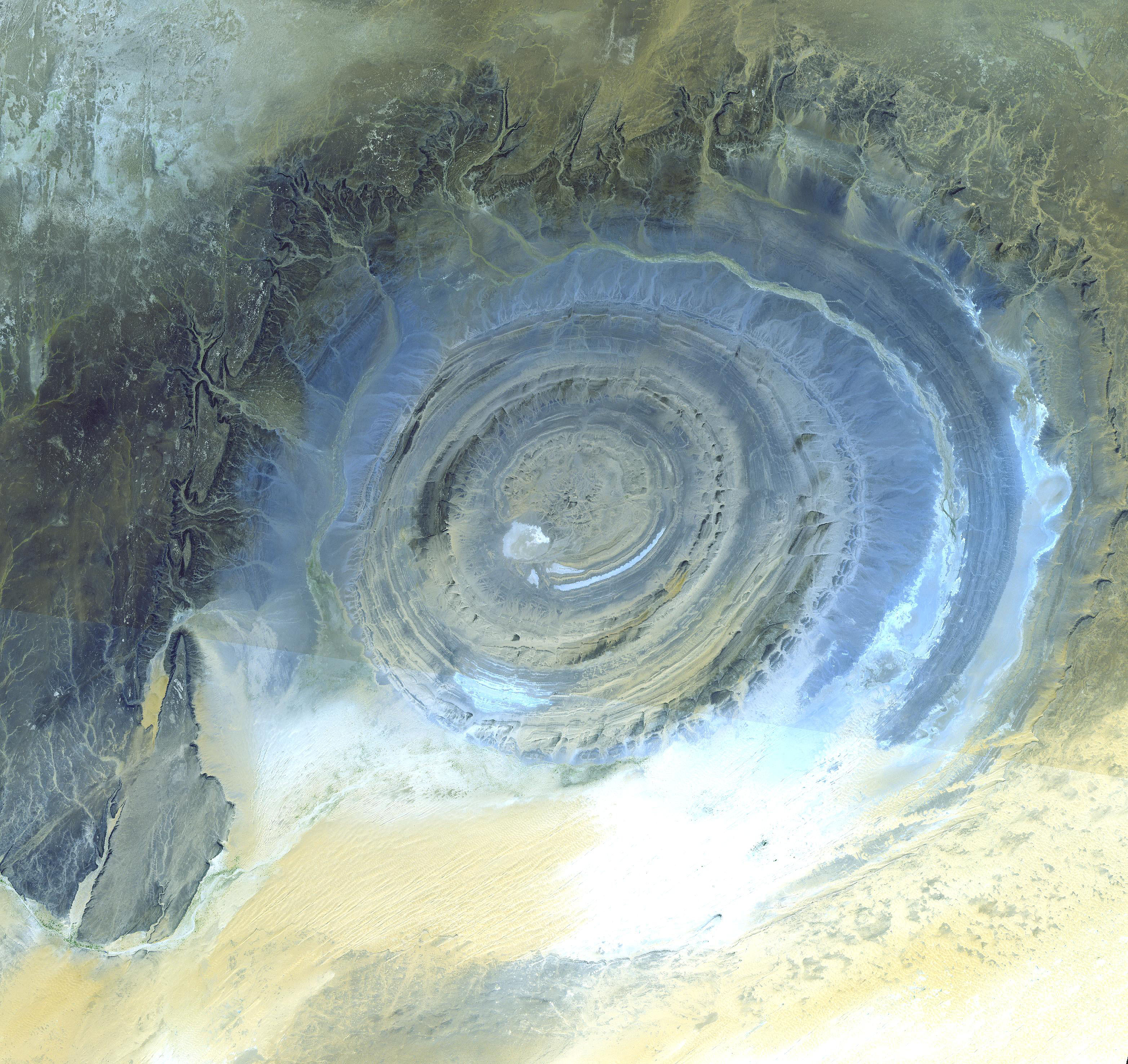
The Richat structure (a geologic dome)

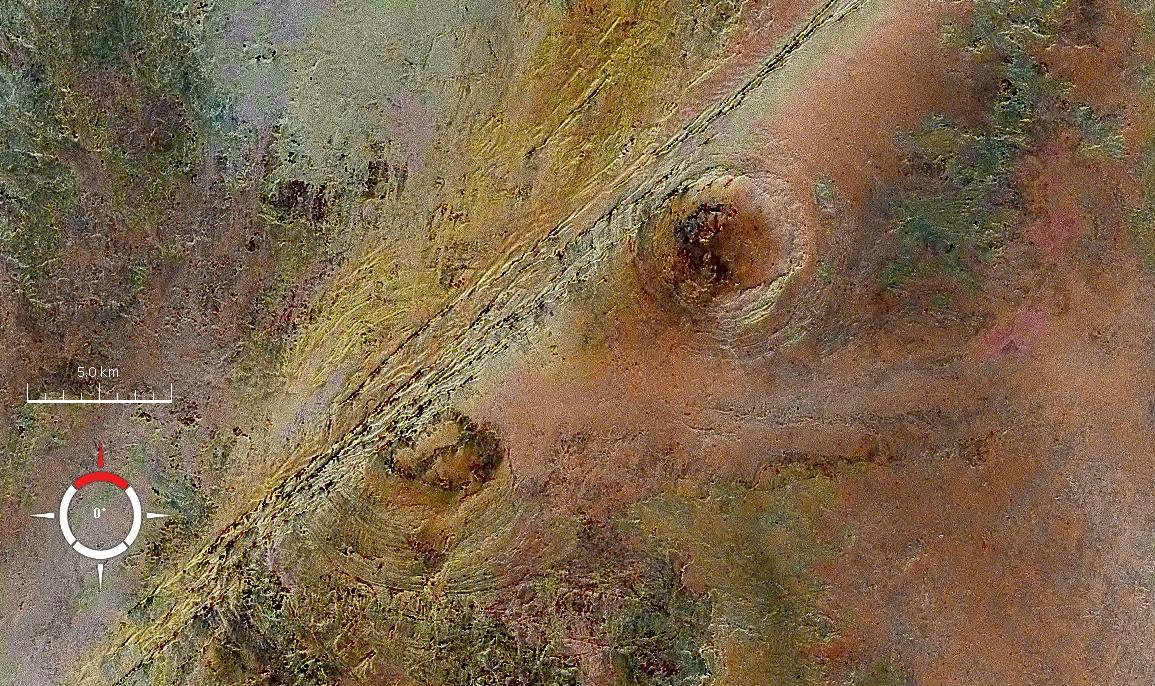
The Arkenu structures (a pair of ring dikes)

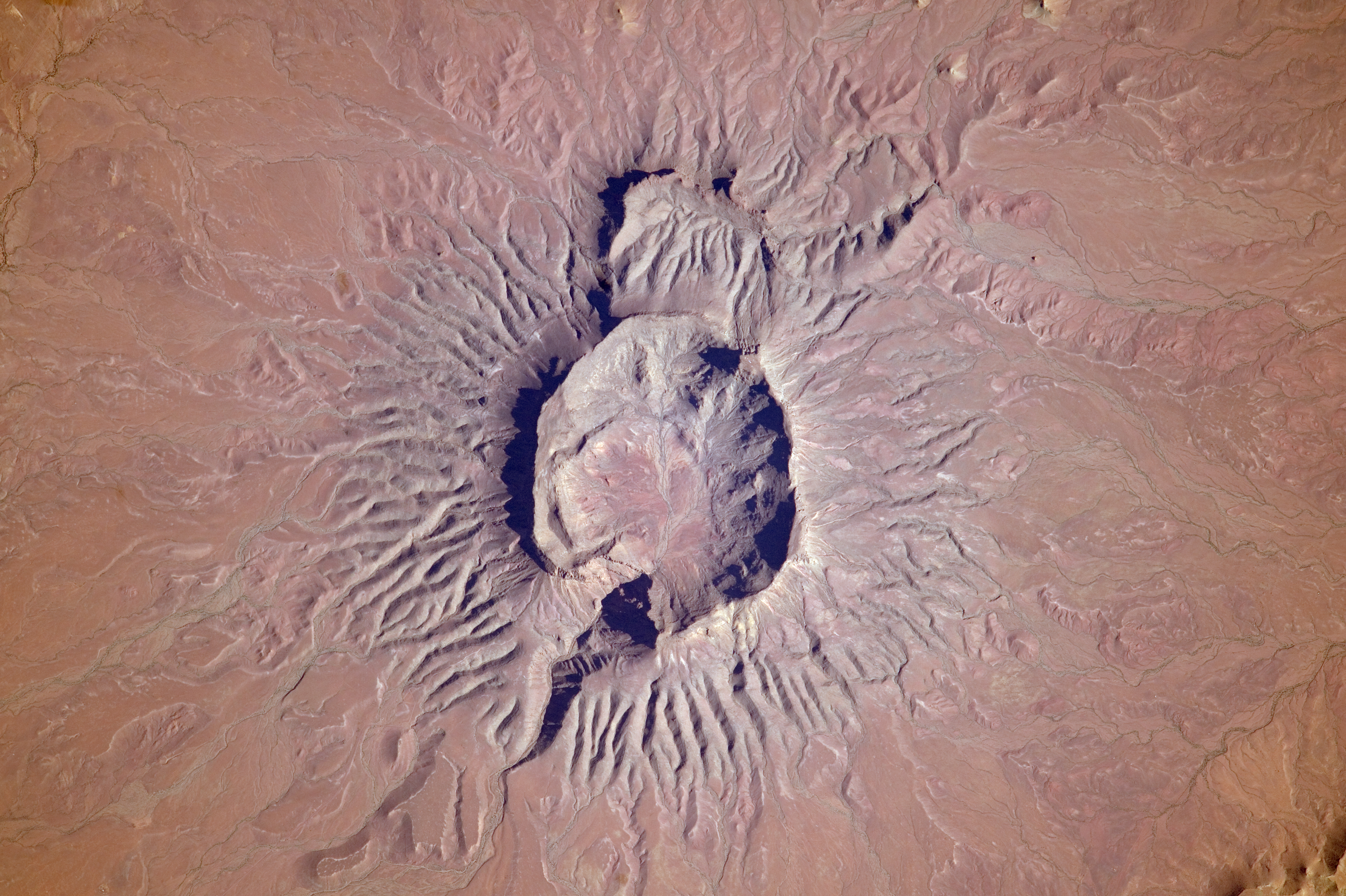
Brukkaros Mountain (a tuff ring)

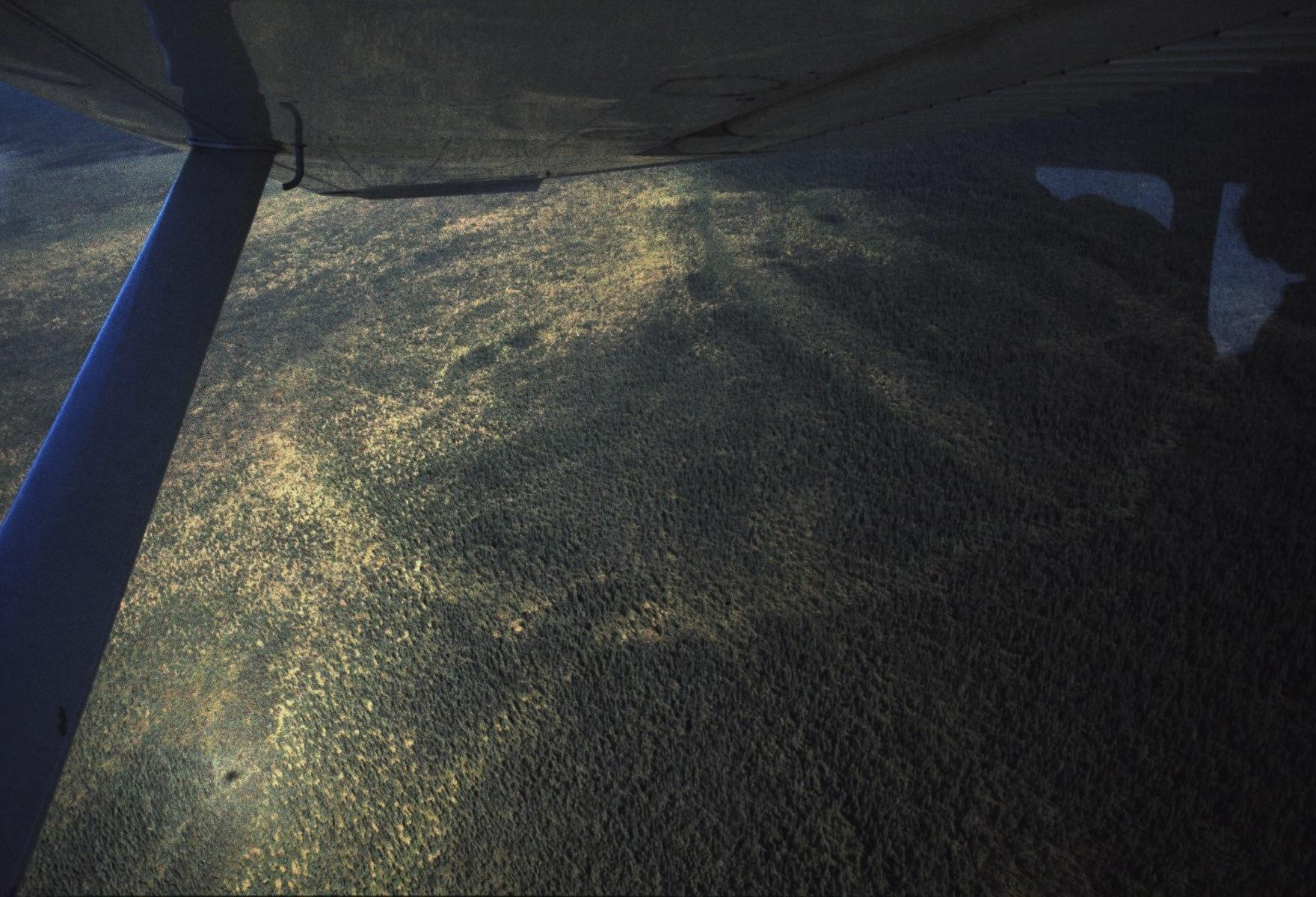
A forest ring in Ontario

== See also ==
- Earth Impact Database
- Gliese 710 – example of gravitational perturbations (in mega-year scale) of the Solar System
- Impact Field Studies Group
- Impact craters
- Impact events
- List of impact craters on Earth
- Meteor air burst
- Tollmann's bolide hypothesis
- Traces of Catastrophe, 1998 book from Lunar and Planetary Institute – comprehensive reference on impact crater science

== Notes and references ==
=== Bibliography ===
- Mikheeva, Anna (2019), The Complete Catalog of the Earth's Impact structures, Institute of Computational Mathematics and Mathematical Geophysics SB RAS, p. 1
