= Iturralde =

Iturralde may refer to:

- Abel Iturralde Province, one of the twenty provinces of the Bolivian department of La Paz
- Edna Iturralde, Ecuadorian author who has won many national and international awards
- Eduardo Iturralde González (born 1967), Spanish football referee
- Estadio Carlos Iturralde, multi-use stadium in the Mexican city of Mérida, Yucatán
- Iturralde Crater, 8 km diameter circular feature in the Bolivian portion of the Amazon Rainforest, first identified in 1985
- Manuel Ignacio de Vivanco Iturralde, Peruvian politician and military leader
- Pedro Iturralde (1929–2020), Spanish saxophonist, saxophone teacher and composer of classical music
- Iturralde (Bilbao), neighbourhood in the Ibaiondo district of Bilbao, Spain
- Iturralde (Panama), subdivision of La Chorrera District in Panamá Oeste Province, Panama
