= Richat Structure =

Circular geological feature in the Sahara desert

Richat Structure قلب الريشات (Arabic) Tagense
- Dome
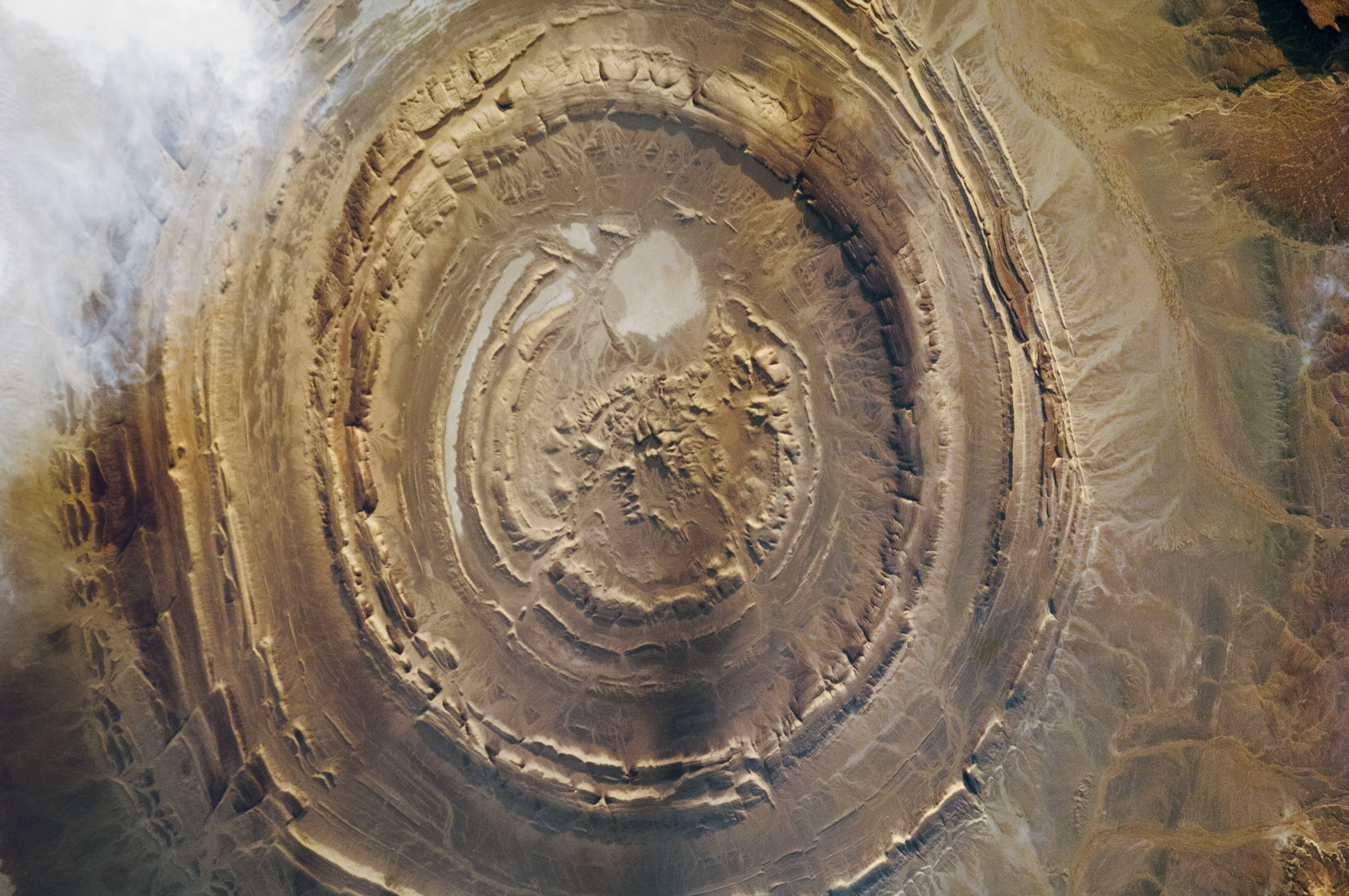
- Image from the International Space Station, 17 December 2011

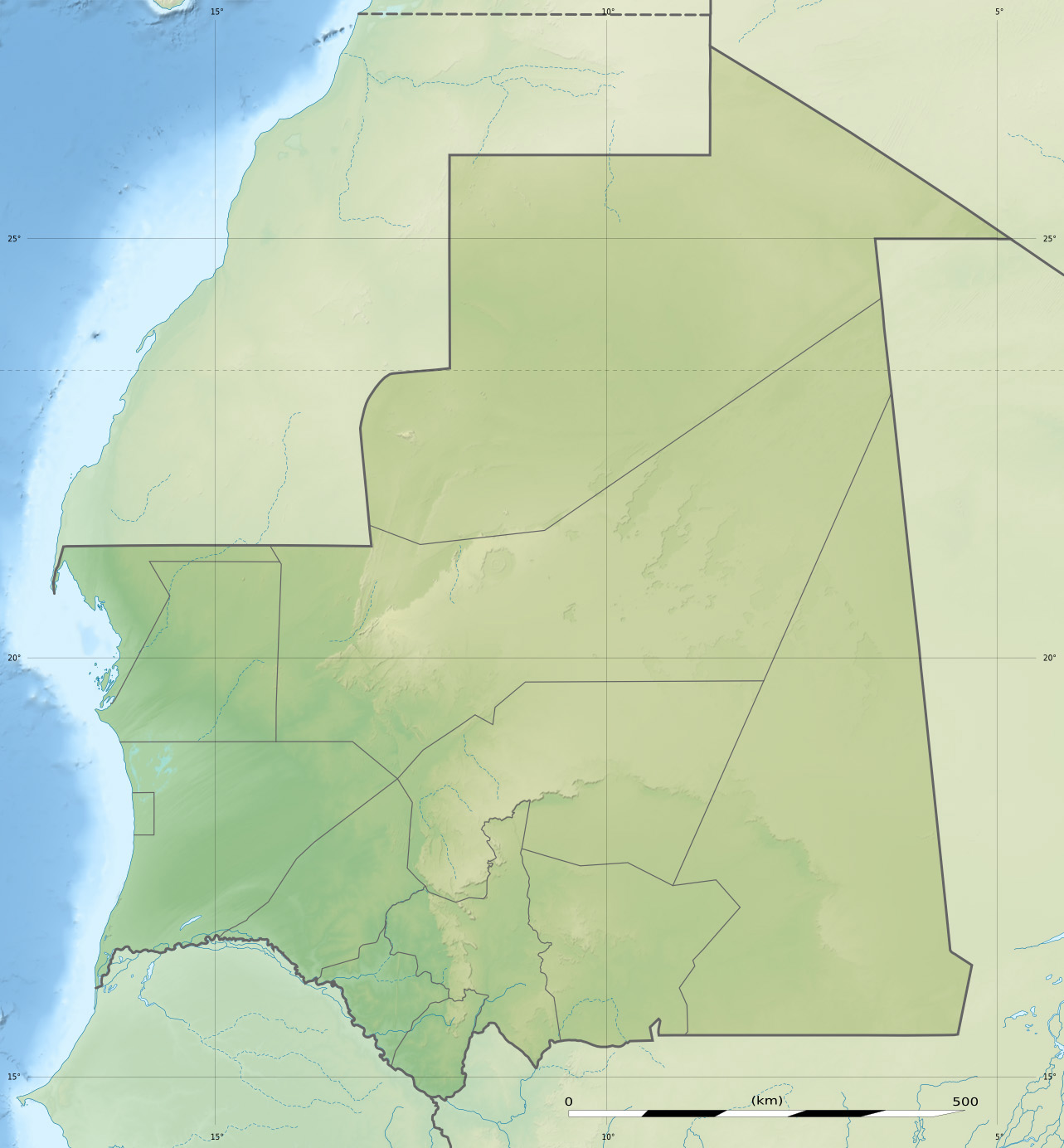
- Location within Mauritania Location within Africa
- Coordinates: 21°06′53″N 11°23′39″W
- Location: Adrar Plateau of the Sahara
- Part of: Adrar Region, Mauritania

The Richat Structure, or Guelb er Richât (Arabic: قلب الريشات, romanized: Qalb ar-Rīšāt, Hassaniyya: [galb er.riːʃaːt]), often called the Eye of Africa is a prominent circular geological feature at the northwestern edge of the Taoudeni Basin, on the Adrar Plateau of the Sahara. It is located near Ouadane in the Adrar Region of Mauritania. In Hassaniya Arabic, rīšāt means feathers and it is also known locally in Arabic as tagense, referring to the circular opening of the leather pouch that is used to draw water from local wells.

It is an eroded geological dome, 40 kilometres (25 mi) in diameter, caused by a subsurface igneous intrusion deforming the overlying sedimentary rock layers, causing the rock to be exposed as concentric rings with the oldest layers exposed at the centre of the structure. Igneous rock is exposed inside and there are rhyolites and gabbros that have undergone hydrothermal alteration, and a central megabreccia. The structure is also the location of exceptional accumulations of Acheulean Paleolithic stone tools. It was selected as one of the 100 geological heritage sites identified by the International Union of Geological Sciences (IUGS) to be of the highest scientific value.

== Description ==
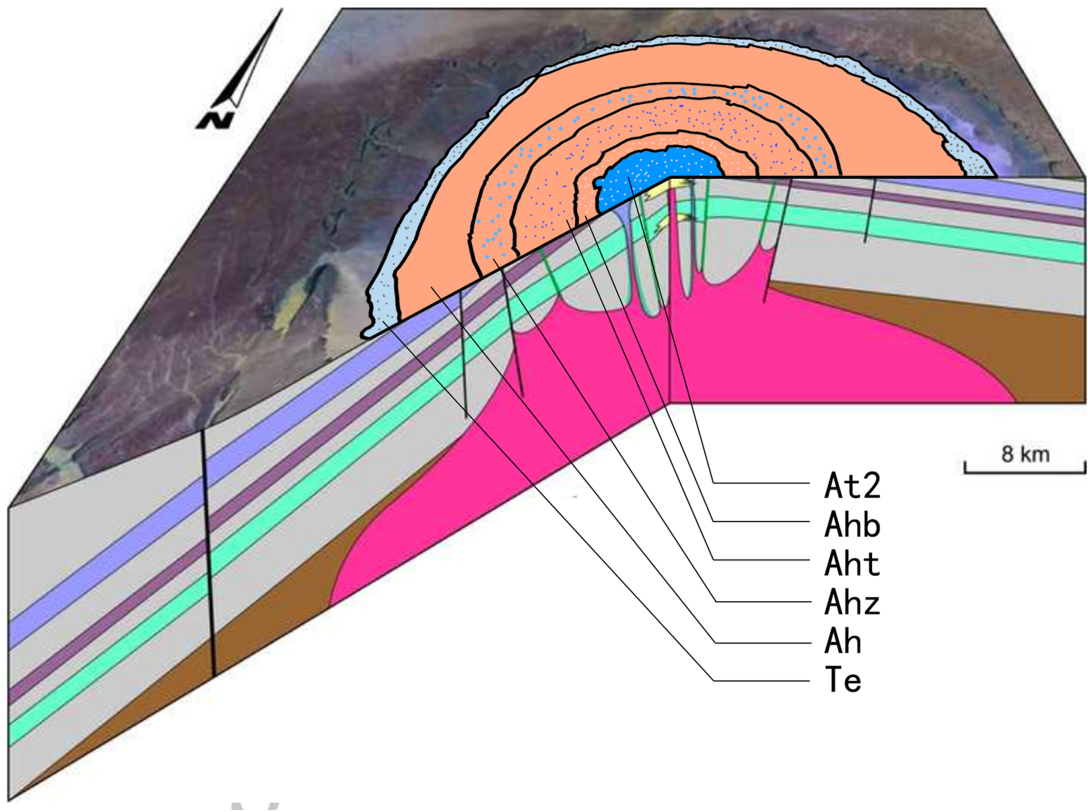
Cross section of the structure. Magenta is the volcanic intrusion, while purple, green and grey represent sedimentary layers

The Richat Structure is a deeply eroded, slightly elliptical dome with a diameter of 40 kilometres (25 mi). The sedimentary rock exposed in this dome ranges in age from Late Proterozoic within the center of the dome to Ordovician sandstone around its edges. The sedimentary rocks composing this structure dip outward at 10–20°. Differential erosion of resistant layers of quartzite has created high-relief circular cuestas. Its center consists of a siliceous breccia covering an area that is at least 30 kilometres (19 mi) in diameter.

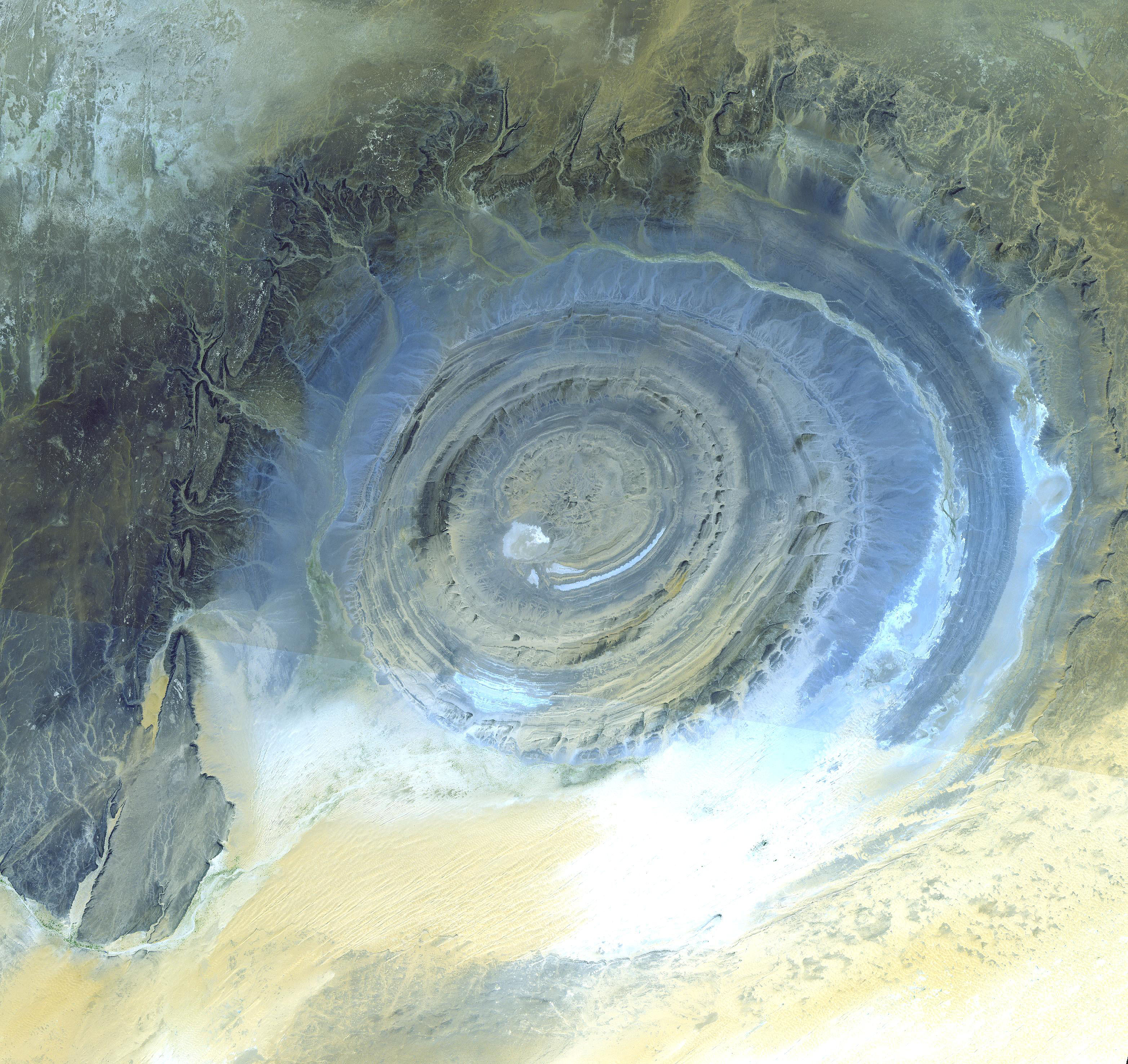
Satellite picture of the Richat Structure (false color)

Exposed within the interior of the Richat Structure is a variety of intrusive and extrusive igneous rocks. They include rhyolitic volcanic rocks, gabbros, carbonatites and kimberlites. The rhyolitic rocks consist of lava flows and hydrothermally altered tuffaceous rocks that are part of two distinct eruptive centers, which are interpreted to be the eroded remains of two maars. According to field mapping, aeromagnetic, and gravimetric data, the gabbroic rocks form two concentric ring dikes. The inner ring dike is about 30 metres (98 ft) in width, 3 kilometres (1.9 mi) from the center of the Richat Structure. The outer ring dike is about 70 metres (230 ft) in width, 8 kilometres (5.0 mi) from the center of the structure. Thirty-two carbonatite dikes and sills have been mapped within the structure. The dikes are generally about 300 metres (980 ft) long and typically 1 to 4 metres (3.3 to 13.1 ft) wide. They consist of massive carbonatites that are mostly devoid of vesicles. The carbonatite rocks have been dated as having cooled between 94 and 104 million years ago. A kimberlitic plug and several sills have been found within the northern part of the structure. The kimberlite plug has been dated to around 99 million years old. These intrusive igneous rocks are interpreted as indicating the presence of a large alkaline igneous intrusion that currently underlies the structure and was created by uplifting the overlying rock.

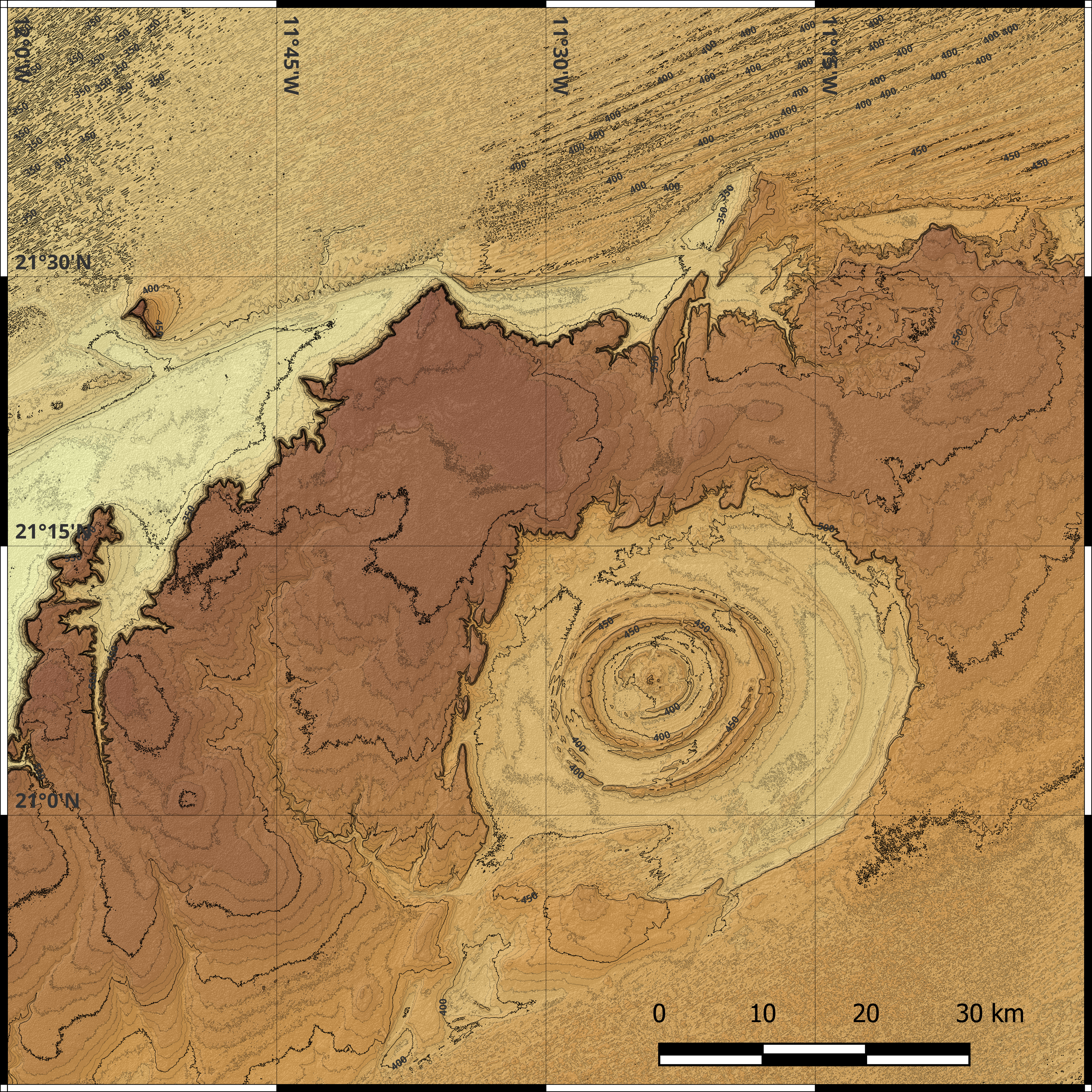
Topographic map of Guelb er Richat. Elevation in meters. 10 m contour interval with major contour line every 50 m

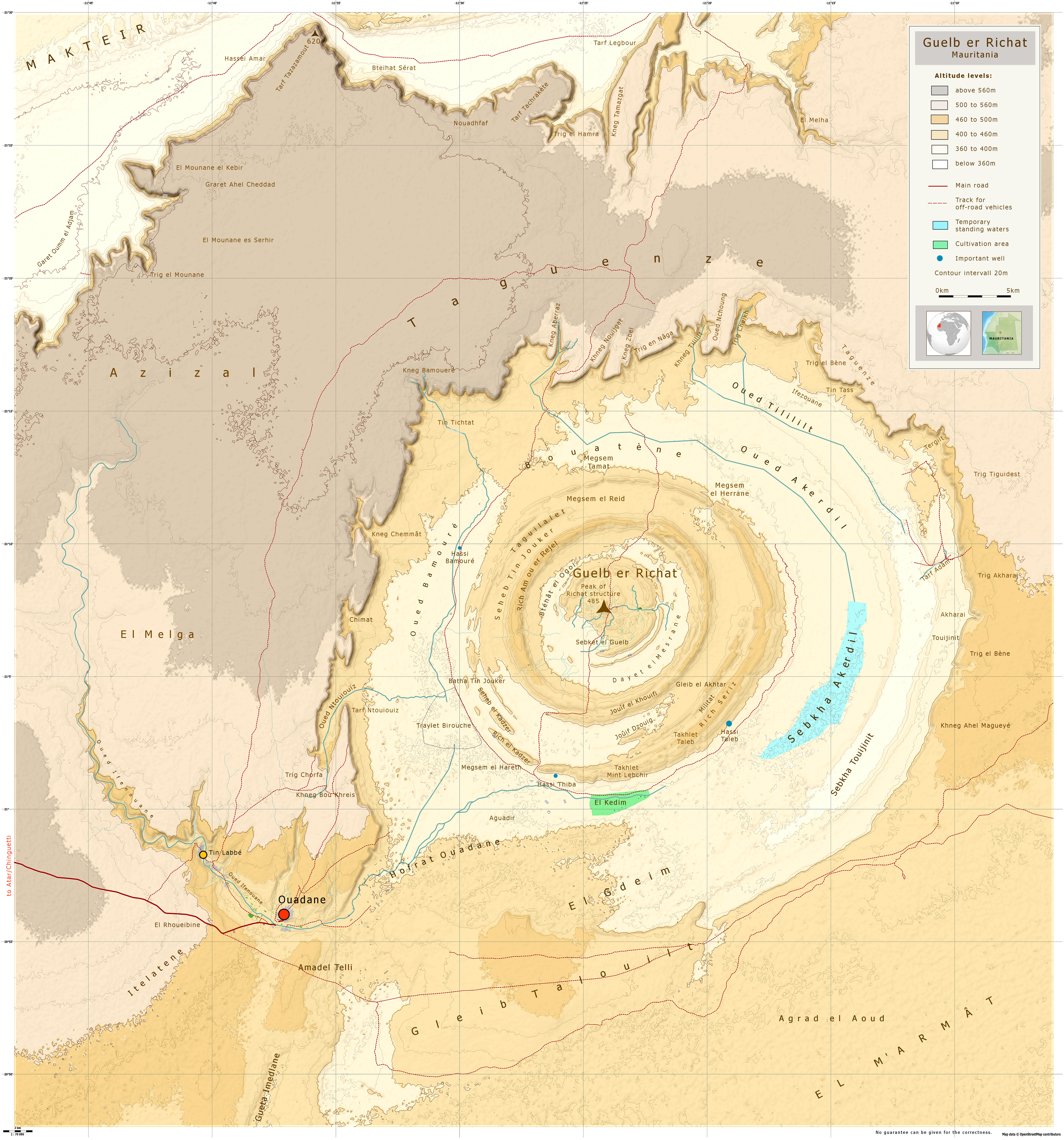
Topographic map of Guelb er Richat and Ouadane with place and field names

Spectacular hydrothermal features are a part of the Richat Structure. They include the extensive hydrothermal alteration of rhyolites and gabbros and a central megabreccia created by hydrothermal dissolution and collapse. The siliceous megabreccia is at least 40 metres (130 ft) thick in its center to only a few meters thick along its edges. The breccia consists of fragments of white to dark gray cherty material, quartz-rich sandstone, diagenetic cherty nodules, and stromatolitic limestone and is intensively silicified. The hydrothermal alteration, which created this breccia, has been dated to have occurred about 98.2 ± 2.6 million years ago using the ^{40}Ar/^{39}Ar method.

== Interpretation ==
The structure was first described in the 1930s to 1940s, as Richât Crater or Richât buttonhole (boutonnière du Richât). Richard-Molard (1948) considered it to be the result of a laccolithic uplift. A geological expedition to Mauritania led by Théodore Monod in 1952 recorded four "crateriform or circular irregularities" (accidents cratériformes ou circulaires) in the area, Er Richât, Aouelloul (south of Chinguetti), Temimichat-Ghallaman and Tenoumer. It was initially considered to be an impact structure (as is clearly the case with the other three), but a closer study in the 1950s to 1960s suggested that it might instead have been formed by terrestrial processes. After field and laboratory studies in the 1960s, no significant evidence was found for shock metamorphism or other deformation indicative of a hypervelocity extraterrestrial impact. Coesite, an indicator of shock metamorphism, was initially reported as being present in rock samples from the structure, but a further analysis in 1969 concluded that barite had been misidentified as coesite. Work on dating the structure was done in the 1990s. A study of the formation of the structure by Matton, et al. (2005, 2008) concluded it was not an impact structure.

Further analysis of deep structure underneath the surface, including with aeromagnetic and gravimetric mapping, concluded that the structure is the result of ring faults which led to gabbroic ring dikes over a large intrusive body of magma, and the uplifting and later erosion of a dome, through intense hydrothermal activity through the fractured substructure. This can form cuestas over time through the differential erosion of the resulting alternating hard and soft rock layers. The underlying alkaline igneous complex exposed through erosion dates to the Cretaceous period. (Note: The breccia core is genetically related to plutonic activity since doming and the production of hydrothermal fluids were instrumental in creating a favorable setting for dissolution. The resulting fluids were also responsible for subsequent silicification and hydrothermal infilling. To the best of our knowledge, karst collapse phenomena at the summit of an alkaline complex are unique but may be more frequent than previously believed.(Matton 2005))

=== IUGS geological heritage site ===
In respect of it being "a spectacular example of a magmatic concentric alkaline complex", the International Union of Geological Sciences (IUGS) included the Richat Structure in its assemblage of 100 geological heritage sites around the world, in October 2022. The organisation defines an IUGS Geological Heritage Site as "a key place with geological elements and/or processes of international scientific relevance, used as a reference, and/or with a substantial contribution to the development of geological sciences through history."

== Archaeology ==
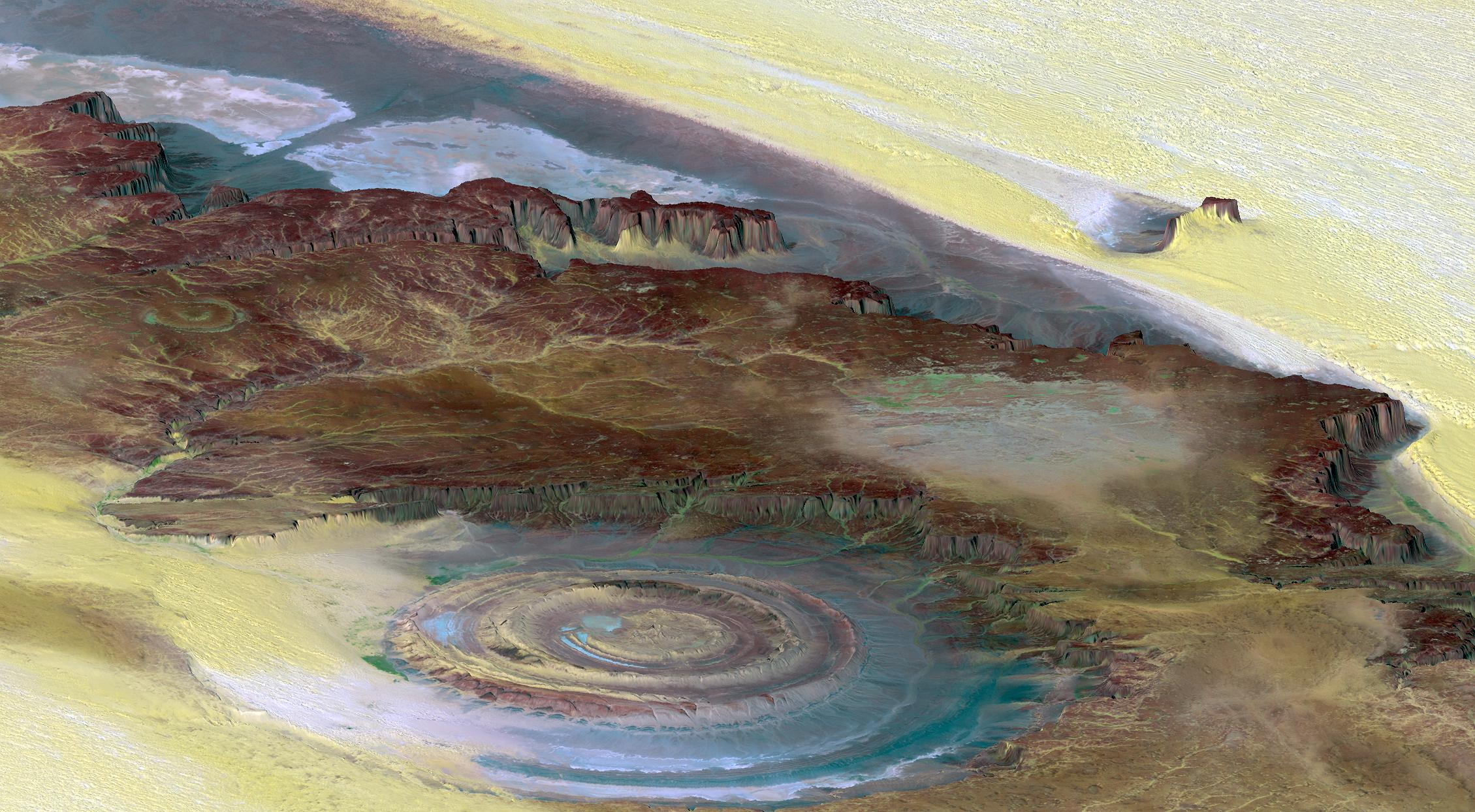
A topographic reconstruction (scaled 6:1 on the vertical axis) from satellite photos. False colouring as follows: • Brown: bedrock • Yellow/white: sand • Green: vegetation • Blue: salty sediments

The Richat Structure is the location of exceptional accumulations of Acheulean artifacts. These Acheulean archaeological sites are located along wadis that occupy the outermost annular depression of this structure. Pre-Acheulean stone tools also have been found in the same areas. These sites are associated with rubbly outcrops of quartzite that provided the raw material needed for the manufacture of these artifacts. The most important Acheulean sites and their associated outcrops are found along the northwest of the outer ring, from which Wadi Akerdil heads east and Wadi Bamouere to the west. Sparse and widely scattered Neolithic spear points and other artifacts have also been found. However, since these sites were first discovered by Théodore Monod in 1974, mapping of artifacts within the area of the structure have found them to be generally absent in its innermost depressions. The local apparent wealth of surface artifacts is the result of the concentration and mixing by deflation over multiple glacial-interglacial cycles.

Artifacts are found, typically redeposited, deflated, or both, in Late Pleistocene to early Holocene gravelly mud, muddy gravel, clayey sand, and silty sand. These sediments are often cemented into either concretionary masses or beds by calcrete. Ridges typically consist of deeply weathered bedrock representing truncated Cenozoic paleosols that formed under tropical environments. The Pleistocene to Middle Holocene sediments occur along wadis as the thin, meter- to less-than-meter-thick accumulations in the interior annular depressions to 3-to-4-metre-thick (9.8 to 13.1 ft) accumulations along the wadis in the outermost annular depression of the structure. The gravelly deposits consist of a mixture of slope scree, debris flow, and fluviatile or even torrential flow deposits. The finer-grained, sandy deposits consist of eolian and playa lake deposits. The latter contain well-preserved freshwater fossils. Numerous concordant radiocarbon dates indicate that the bulk of these sediments accumulated between 15,000 and 8,000 BP during the African humid period. These deposits lie directly upon deeply eroded and weathered bedrock.

In addition to Acheulean artifacts, the Richat Structure contains Middle Stone Age Aterian stone artifacts produced by modern humans, dating to the latest Middle Pleistocene to Late Pleistocene period, around 145,000-29,000 years ago.

The protruding land dikes of the Richat Structure are lined with thousands of stone burial mounds in various styles. These still remain to be excavated in order to establish their age. Several rock art sites have also been identified, which include depictions of horsemen armed with javelins, chariots, bovids, elephants (Tililit, Oued Slil) and Libyco-Berber inscriptions (Tin Labbé, Lemqader).

== Fringe theory of Atlantis site ==
The Richat Structure has been the subject of unsubstantiated fringe claims to be the site of Atlantis mentioned in the works of Plato. This claim is primarily based on the concentric nature of the structure, which superficially matches Plato's description of the city. Most classicists believe that Atlantis was a fictional rhetorical invention by Plato, rather than a real geographic location. According to archaeologist Sean M. Rafferty, other than superficially matching Plato's Atlantis description in being circular, in its particular details, including being a geologically ancient natural structure, the Richat Structure bears little resemblance to Plato's description of Atlantis, with the Richat Structure's location far inland in a desert contradicting Plato's information regarding the location of Atlantis. Skeptic Steven Novella criticised other inconsistencies in the claim, including the lack of any archaeological evidence for a city having been built there, and the lack of evidence for the canals mentioned in Plato's Atlantis account.
