= Temimichat Crater =

Proposed impact crater in Mauritania

Coordinates: 24°15′N 9°39′W

- Location: Mauritania

Impact crater structure
- Confidence: Proposed
- Diameter: 700 metres (2,300 ft)

Temimichat is a proposed impact crater in Mauritania.

== Details ==
The Temimichat crater is located in northern Mauritania and has been listed together with other Mauritanian craters or crater-like features. Its diameter is about 700 metres (2,300 ft). According to Pomerol (1967), mafic rocks have been found in the area. Its age is still unknown, but the present erosional level suggests a relatively old age of formation.

== See also ==
- Tenoumer crater
- List of possible impact structures on Earth
