= Umm al Binni lake =

Umm al Binni Lake
- Location within Iraq
- Interactive map of Umm al Binni Lake
- Location: Maysan Governorate
- Coordinates: 31°14′29″N 47°06′21″E
- Lake type: former lake
- Basin countries: Iraq
- Max. length: 3.4 km (2.1 mi)
- Max. depth: 3 m (9.8 ft)

Umm al Binni lake is a mostly dry lake within the Central Marshes in Maysan Governorate in southern Iraq. The 3.4-kilometre-wide (2.1 mi) lake is approximately 45 km (28 mi) northwest of the Tigris–Euphrates confluence. Because of its shape, location, and other details, it was first conjectured by Sharad Master, a geoarchaeologist, to represent an impact crater. However, these claims have been disputed, with other studies finding subsidence of the underlying rock a more plausible explanation.

== Evidence as an impact crater ==
Based on the interpretation of satellite imagery, Sharad Master suggests the 3.4-kilometre-diameter (2.1 mi) dry lake may be an impact crater based on its nearly circular, slightly polygonal rim shape, and contrasting shape to other lakes in the region. However, the circularity of its shape has been disputed, with a 2018 study finding that the northeastern and southwestern sections of the lake rim were straight, corresponding to the directions of regional faulting. As to its origin, Masters rejects karst topography, salt doming, tectonic deformation, and igneous intrusion as well as possible bombing or man-made origins. However, a 2018 study concluded that the formation of the lake could be better explained by the subsidence of the underlying basement fault blocks, and that the southern part of the rim had been anthropogenically shaped.

== Details and historical context ==
Master estimates the age of the crater to be less than 5000 years old, or between 2000 and 3000 BC, due to the deposition of sediments of the Tigris-Euphrates plain as a result of the 130–150 km (81–93 mi) seaward progradation of the Persian Gulf during that time period. Some relate this apparent impact site to the 2350 BC Middle East Anomaly. A lack of writings describing this event by well-known authors like Herodotus (484–425 BC) and Nearchus (360–300 BC) or later historians implies any impact may have occurred much earlier, between 2000 and 3000 BC.

== Climate change and impact effects ==
It has been proposed that sudden climate changes and catastrophic events around 2200 BCE (including the collapse of the Sumerian civilisation) could be linked to a comet or asteroid impact. Master has conjectured that the alleged Umm al Binni impact could be responsible for this catastrophe, producing the energy equivalent to thousands of Hiroshima-sized bombs.

Using equations describing impact effects based on work from Collins et al., Shoemaker, Glasstone & Dolan and others, Hamacher determined that an impacting bolide would have produced energy in the range of 190 to 750 megatons of TNT (for an asteroid and comet impact, respectively). For comparison, the Tunguska event was estimated to have an explosive force of about 10-15 megatons.

== See also ==
- 4.2-kiloyear event, c. 2200 BC
- Burckle Crater
- Great Flood (China), c. 2300 BC
- List of possible impact structures on Earth
- Tunguska event
