= Woodleigh impact structure =

Impact structure in Western Australia

- Location within Western Australia
- Location: Gascoyne, Gascoyne, Western Australia, Australia; 26°3′S 114°40′E

Impact crater structure
- Confidence: Confirmed
- Diameter: 60–160 km (37–99 mi)
- Age: 364 ± 8 Ma; Late Devonian to Early Carboniferous
- Exposed: No
- Drilled: Yes

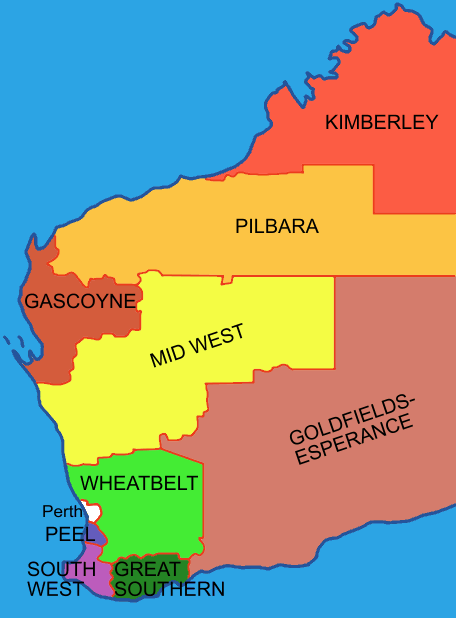
The Gascoyne in North West Australia.

Woodleigh is a large meteorite impact structure (astrobleme) in Western Australia, centred on Woodleigh Station east of Shark Bay in the Gascoyne region. A team of four scientists at the Geological Survey of Western Australia and the Australian National University, led by Arthur J. Mory, announced the discovery in the 15 April 2000 issue of Earth and Planetary Science Letters.

== Description ==
The structure is not exposed at the surface and therefore its size is uncertain. The original discovery team stated in 2000 that it may be up to 120 kilometres (75 mi) in diameter, but others argue it may be much smaller, with one 2003 study suggesting a diameter closer to 60 kilometres (37 mi). The larger estimate of 120 kilometres (75 mi), if correct, would make this impact structure tied for the fourth largest confirmed impact structure in the world, and imply a bolide (asteroid or comet) about 5 to 6 kilometres (3.1 to 3.7 mi) in diameter. A more recent study in 2010 suggests the structure could be between 60 and 160 kilometres (37 and 99 mi) or more, and was produced by a comet or asteroid 6 to 12 kilometres (3.7 to 7.5 mi) wide.

The central uplift, interpreted to be 20 kilometres (12 mi) in diameter, was first intersected by drilling activities in the late 1970s; however its significance as an impact structure was only realised in 1997 during a gravity survey. In 1999, a new core sample was taken. The thin veins of melted glass, breccia, and shocked quartz found would have formed under pressures 100,000 times greater than atmospheric pressure at sea level, or between 10 and 100 times greater than those generated by volcanic or earthquake activity. Only a large impact could have generated such conditions. The reported discovery in 2018 of the extremely rare mineral reidite in a drillcore sample from the central uplift zone, supports the interpretation of the original crater as being over 100 kilometres (62 mi) in diameter, and possibly the largest in Australia.

The Woodleigh impact event, originally thought in the early 2000s to have occurred between 259 Ma to 201 Ma (or between the Late Permian and Late Triassic) is now thought to date from 364 ± 8 million years (Late Devonian). This time corresponds approximately to the Late Devonian extinction of about 370 million years ago. There is evidence for other large impact events at around the same time, such as the East Warburton Basin, so if the extinction is related to impact, perhaps more than one crater was involved.

Of the two dozen or more impact structures known in Australia, the three largest are Woodleigh, Acraman, and Tookoonooka. The Gnargoo structure, which has remarkable similarities to Woodleigh, is a nearby proposed impact crater on the Gascoyne platform.

== See also ==
- Carnarvon Basin
- East Warburton Basin
