= Burckle Crater =

Underwater feature in the Indian Ocean

Burckle crater
- Location of Burckle Crater in the Indian Ocean
- Location: 30.865°S 61.365°E

Impact crater structure
- Confidence: Hypothesized, contested
- Diameter: ~29 km (18 mi; 16 nmi)
- Depth: 3,800 m (12,500 ft)
- Age: ~5000 years (Holocene)
- Exposed: No
- Drilled: No
- Bolide type: Unknown, possibly remains of a comet

The Burckle crater is an undersea topographic feature about 29 kilometres (18 mi; 16 nmi) in diameter in the southwestern Indian Ocean. A team of Earth scientists called the Holocene Impact Working Group proposes the feature to be an impact crater; these claims are disputed by other geologists.

== Description ==
Burckle Crater lies 3,810 metres (12,500 ft) below the surface in the southern Indian Ocean at 30.865°S 61.365°E. It is east of Madagascar and west of Western Australia, adjacent to the mid-ocean Southwest Indian Ridge.

== Impact event and megatsunami hypothesis ==
Burckle Crater's position was determined in 2006 by the Holocene Impact Working Group using prehistoric chevron dune formations in Australia and Madagascar. Based on a hypothesis that these dunes were formed by a megatsunami resulting from an impact, the researchers were able to triangulate the location of Burckle Crater.

In 2009, geologists Jody Bourgeois and R. Weiss challenged the hypothesis that a megatsunami created the chevron dunes. Using a computer model to simulate a tsunami, they argued that the structures are more consistent with aeolian processes. Other Earth scientists also dispute the tsunami origin of the chevrons.

Other problems with the claim include:

- The Holocene Impact Working Group has suggested that multiple significant impact events occurred in the past 10,000 years, but astrononomical models indicate that impact events large enough to cause "hazardous tsunamis" should be expected only about once per 100,000 years, making the Working Group's claims improbable enough that they call for very strong evidence.
- The Working Group bases its claims mostly on the locations of coastal sedimentary deposits that it has identified and termed "chevrons" and interprets as having been caused by the run-up from impact-generated megatsunamis. Other geologists assessed them to be parabolic sand dunes both before and after the Working Group published its findings. The chevrons in Madagascar are precisely aligned with the normal prevailing wind direction at the site as shown by modern weather data, implying that they likely were deposited gradually by wind under present-day conditions as sand dunes, and not by a catastrophic tsunami.
- The Working Group reported finding nickel and iron splash droplets fused to foraminifera tests in slides taken from deep-ocean core samples near Burckle Crater, but this interpretation is problematic because formaminifera tests are made of calcium carbonate, which chemically decomposes at about 500 °C (932 °F), while nickel and iron melt at temperatures higher than 1,400 °C (2,552 °F). Additionally, comparable splash droplets fused to foraminifera tests have not been reported from any of the sediment studies performed near the Chicxulub crater on the Yucatán Peninsula in Mexico.
- Setting out to identify past impact events by looking for holes in the ground has misled investigators in the past, including the time a sheep watering hole in Italy was called the "Sirente crater."

== See also ==
- Fenambosy Chevron
- Flood myth
- List of possible impact structures on Earth
- Mahuika crater
- Umm al Binni structure
