= Mid-24th-century BCE climate anomaly =

Conjectured Bronze-age natural disaster

The mid-24th-century BCE climate anomaly is the period between 2354 and 2345 BCE when annual temperatures consistently dropped, a discovery reconstructed from consecutive abnormally narrow rings in Irish oak trees. These tree rings are indicative of a period of catastrophically reduced growth in Irish trees during that period. This range of dates also matches the transition from the Neolithic to the Bronze Age in the British Isles and a period of widespread societal collapse in the Near East. It has been proposed that this anomalous downturn in the climate might have been the result of comet debris suspended in the atmosphere.

In 1997, Marie-Agnès Courty proposed that a natural disaster involving wildfires, floods, and an air blast of over 100 megatons occurred about 2350 BCE. This proposal is based on unusual "dust" deposits which have been reported from archaeological sites in Mesopotamia that are a few hundred kilometres from each other. In later papers, Courty subsequently revised the date of this event from 2350 BCE to 2000 BCE.

Based only upon the analysis of satellite imagery, Umm al Binni lake in southern Iraq has been suggested as a possible extraterrestrial impact crater and possible cause of this natural disaster. More recent sources have argued for a formation of the lake through the subsidence of the underlying basement fault blocks. Baillie and McAneney's 2015 analysis of this climate anomaly discusses its abnormally narrow Irish tree rings and the anomalous dust deposits of Courty. However, their study lacks any mention of Umm al Binni lake.

== See also ==
- 4.2-kiloyear event, c. 2200 BCE
- Great Flood (China), c. 2300 BCE
