= Bedout =

Geological and geophysical feature in Western Australia

- Location within Western Australia
- Location: Canning Basin, Indian Ocean, Australia; 18°S 119°E

Impact crater structure
- Confidence: Possible
- Diameter: 30 km (19 mi)
- Age: 250.1 ± 4.5 Ma; Permian-Triassic boundary
- Exposed: No
- Drilled: Yes

Bedout /bɪˈduː/, or more specifically the Bedout High, is a geological and geophysical feature centered about 250 km (160 miles) off the northwestern coast of Australia in the Canning and overlying Roebuck basins. Although not obvious from sea floor topography, it is a roughly circular area about 30 km (20 miles) in diameter where older rocks have been uplifted as much as 4 km (2.5 miles) towards the surface and may mark the centre of a very large buried impact crater up to 250 km (160 miles) in diameter. The Bedout High was penetrated by two petroleum exploration wells (Bedout-1, Lagrange-1) in the 1970s and 1980s. It is named after nearby Bedout Island.

== Impact hypothesis ==
In 1996 Australian geologist John Gorter first suggested that the Bedout High might mark the centre of a very large buried impact crater up to 250 km (160 miles) in diameter, based mainly on its internal geological structure as revealed on a single seismic survey line, and suggested that it may be of near end Permian age, based on the reported age of volcanic rocks in Lagrange-1. The impact hypothesis was developed further by Luanne Becker (University of California) and coworkers who claimed to have confirmed that the supposed volcanic rocks in the petroleum wells are actually impact melt breccia showing evidence of shock metamorphism, and re-dated these rocks at 250.1 ± 4.5 Ma. The new age is essentially coincident with the Permian–Triassic boundary and associated extinction event, and Becker speculates that there is a likely connection. It was subsequently reported, based on very limited preliminary data, that the impact hypothesis is further supported by chromium isotope evidence for the presence of extraterrestrial material.

== Rebuttals to the impact hypothesis ==
The Bedout impact hypothesis has not been widely supported by impact cratering specialists. Specific counter claims include:

1. The alleged impact melt breccia actually has the characteristics of a volcanic basalt, in part altered by contact with sea water and metamorphism due to its deep burial, and the evidence for shock metamorphism is likely mistaken.
2. A crater of the purported size would have produced a widespread layer of ejecta, but no such eject is evident at the nearest Permian-Triassic boundary sites in Australia.
3. The presented evidence for impact fails to meet established standards, and the dating methodology is flawed.
4. A detailed re-evaluation of the geophysical data indicates that the evidence is not consistent with the expected properties of a giant impact crater, but rather the Bedout High was likely the result of episodes of continental rifting.

== See also ==
- List of possible impact structures on Earth
