= Iturralde crater =

Probable impact crater in Bolivia

Iturralde Crater
- Araona crater
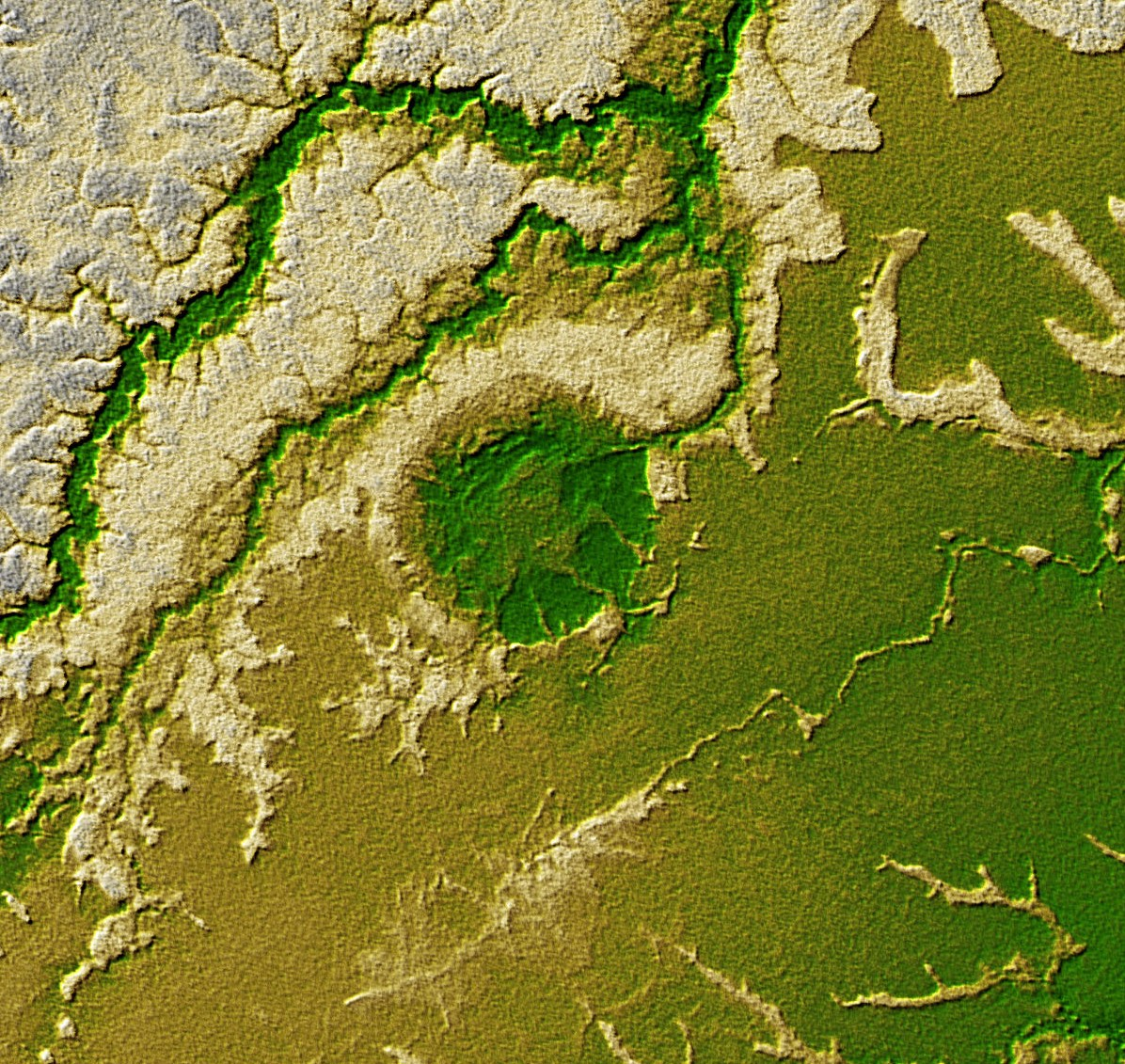
- Topographic image generated from Shuttle Radar Topography Mission data over Iturralde crater

- Location within Bolivia
- Location: Madidi National Park, Ixiamas, Abel Iturralde, La Paz, Bolivia; 12°35.2′S 67°40.5′W

Impact crater structure
- Confidence: Probable
- Diameter: 8 km (5.0 mi)
- Depth: 20 m (66 ft)
- Age: 11,000 to 30,000 years ago Late Pleistocene
- Exposed: Yes
- Drilled: No
- Bolide type: Air bursting meteorite?

Iturralde Crater (also called Araona Crater) is an 8-kilometre (5.0 mi) diameter circular geophysical feature in Madidi National Park in the Bolivian portion of the Amazon rainforest, first identified from Landsat satellite imagery in 1985. The structure is located in a remote area in the Abel Iturralde Province of La Paz Department and was visited by researchers in 2002. Based on the presence of millions of glass beads, it has been hypothesised that the structure was created in the Late Pleistocene (between 30,000 and 11,000 years ago) by the air burst of a non-impacting meteorite, similar to the Tunguska event in 1908.

== Description ==
The structure was identified on the basis of Landsat imagery in 1985. It is located between the Manupari and Madidi Rivers. Being so circular, it is argued that it may be a meteorite crater. Because it is in an area of active sediment accumulation by rivers, it must be a geologically young feature, with estimates of its age ranging between 11,000 and 30,000 years. Unlike other young craters, it is very flat, so if it is of impact origin, perhaps the crater sunk into the soft sediments leaving only a circular 'ghost' marking the original rim.

The site is very remote, but has been visited twice by scientific investigators, most recently by a team from NASA's Goddard Space Flight Center in September 2002. In both cases, the expeditions failed to find conclusive evidence for the origin of the feature.

Later research of the samples collected in 2002 revealed tiny clusters composed of many glass beads in peak abundances of up to 90 clusters per kilogram at depths of 265 and 355 centimetres (8.69 and 11.65 ft). Some glassy fragments contain hundreds to thousands of bead clusters of almost sub-micron sizes, and the total number of such spheres is estimated as millions per kg. About 90% of the beads are rich in oxides of Al-Si-Ca-Fe, with up to 4.4% TiO_{2}. The rest are mostly iron-rich beads with small amounts of Al and Ca. The presence of the glassy material supports the hypothesis that the Iturralde crater may have formed during an explosion (air burst) as a result of atmospheric impact by a low density extraterrestrial body.

For an air burst to have occurred, the extraterrestrial body must have been small enough and/or possessed low enough density (e.g. porous ice or stone) that made it unable to penetrate the atmosphere and reach the Earth's surface to form a classical impact crater. If so, the impactor would have encountered the atmosphere at velocities of approximately 20 to 50 kilometres per second (12 to 31 mi/s), and the released energy of the airburst would have been comparable to or greater than any known nuclear explosion. Extreme heat created by such atmospheric disruption would have formed convection cells that lifted the surface unconsolidated material into the fireball, where it melted and subsequently settled to Earth in the form of glass beads. The hypervelocity plume of such an airburst could have reached the ground and created the bowl-like feature visible today.

== See also ==
- List of possible impact structures on Earth
- Campo del Cielo
- Río Cuarto craters
