= Mahuika crater =

Hypothesized crater off New Zealand's coast

Coordinates: 48°18′S 166°24′E

Mahuika crater was a hypothesized impact crater named after the Māori god of fire. It was described as being about 20 ± 2 km (12.4 ± 1.2 mi) wide and over 153 meters (502 ft) deep and on the New Zealand continental shelf at 48.3 South and 166.4 East, to the south of The Snares. A 2017 survey of the purported site found no evidence supporting the existence of the crater.

== Initial claims of discovery ==
The crater was reported and named by Dallas Abbott and her colleagues from the Lamont–Doherty Earth Observatory at Columbia University. Based on elemental anomalies, fossils, and minerals, which are interpreted to be derived from the impact, found in an ice core from the Siple Dome in Antarctica, it is argued that the impact which created the Mahuika crater occurred around 1443 AD, but other sources have placed the date as 13 February 1491 AD.

Some evidence suggests that the tsunami it caused was observed by Aboriginal Australians and entered into their oral traditions.

== Doubts over existence ==
In 2010 a paper was published in Marine Geology which critically analysed Abbott's claims regarding the origin of the Mahuika crater. The researchers determined that there was no evidence to indicate a comet created the crater, and therefore the possibility of an impact causing the tsunami was highly unlikely.

A 2017 survey by the NIWA research vessel, RV Tangaroa, using a multibeam echosounder and a sub-bottom profiling system show no evidence for any crater-like feature in the position reported by Abbott and her colleagues. Instead, the site is typical flat continental shelf lying in 160 meters (528 ft) of water. Subsequent bathymetric data compilation and analysis, as part of The Nippon Foundation-GEBCO Seabed 2030 Project, shows no crater-life features on the continental shelf of southern New Zealand.

== See also ==
- Burckle crater
- List of possible impact structures on Earth
