= East Warburton Basin =

Hypothesised impact crater in South Australia

- Location within South Australia
- Location: South Australia, South Australia, Australia; 27°12′45.79″S 139°40′04.39″E

Impact crater structure
- Confidence: Potential
- Diameter: Approximately 200 kilometres (120 mi)
- Age: 360-300 Ma
- Exposed: No
- Drilled: Yes

The East Warburton Basin in South Australia is the site of a hypothesised large impact crater of the Carboniferous period (around 360-300 million years ago). The subterranean structure lies buried at a depth of ~4 km, and measures a minimum of 200 km in diameter. For comparison, the Chicxulub crater, which caused the Cretaceous–Paleogene extinction event, is about 180 km in diameter. The East Warburton crater is adjacent to the West Warburton crater, which is also around 200 km in diameter. Combined, they make up the largest known impact zone on Earth, but individually, are smaller than the largest in the world, the 300 km wide Vredefort impact structure in South Africa. The Warburton craters formed when an asteroid or comet, on a collision course with Earth, split into two main pieces and impacted the Australian continent, then part of the Gondwanan supercontinent.

Scientists proposed the impact formation through analysis of shocked quartz grains from the area after a circular anomaly appeared in seismic tomography studies of the region.

== See also ==
- Cooper Basin
- List of possible impact structures on Earth
