= Mejaouda =

- Location in Mauritania
- Coordinates: 22°27′43″N 7°07′54″W
- Country: Mauritania
- Region: Adrar Region

Mejaouda is a settlement which lies in the Sahara Desert of eastern Mauritania. It is approximately sixty kilometers from the border with Mali.
