= Carnarvon Basin =

Sedimentary basin in Western Australia

Coordinates: 24°48′24″S 115°13′29″E

The Carnarvon Basin is a geological basin located in the north west of Western Australia which extends from the Dampier Archipelago to the Murchison bioregion, and is the main geological feature that makes up the North West Shelf. The onshore part of the Carnarvon Basin covers about 115,000 km^{2} and the offshore part covers approximately 535,000 km^{2} with water depths up to 3,500 metres. It is separated into two major areas - the Northern Carnarvon Basin, and the Southern Carnarvon Basin.

== Northern Carnarvon Basin ==
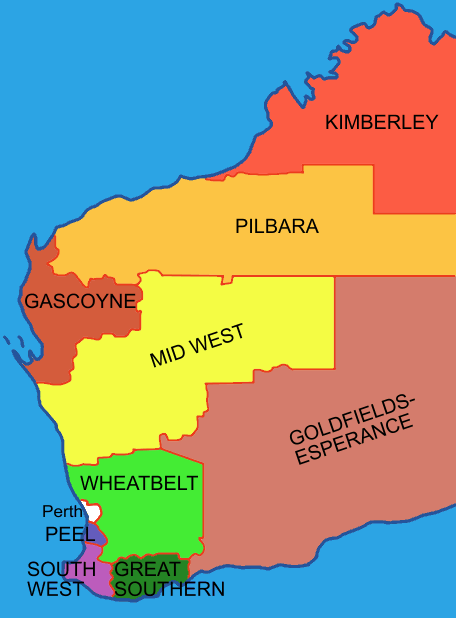
Gascoyne in North West Australia.

The Northern Carnarvon Basin includes the Exmouth Plateau, Wombat Plateau (on the northern part of the Exmouth Plateau), Investigator Sub-basin, Rankin Platform, Exmouth Sub-basin, Barrow Sub-basin, Dampier Sub-basin, Beagle Sub-basin, Enderby Terrace, Peedamullah Shelf and the Lambert Shelf.

The main sub-basins for petroleum exploration in the basin have been Dampier, Exmouth and Barrow.

== Southern Carnarvon Basin ==
The Southern basin consists of the Gascoyne, Merlinleigh, Bidgemia and Byro Sub-basins and Bernier Platform and is flanked to the east by the Archaean Pilbara Block.

== Impact crater ==
The Gnargoo structure, which has remarkable similarities to Woodleigh crater, is a proposed 75 km impact crater on the Gascoyne Platform, Southern Carnarvon Basin with an estimated age of 100-300 Ma.

== See also ==
- Carnarvon (biogeographic region)
