= Dome (geology) =

Geological deformation structure

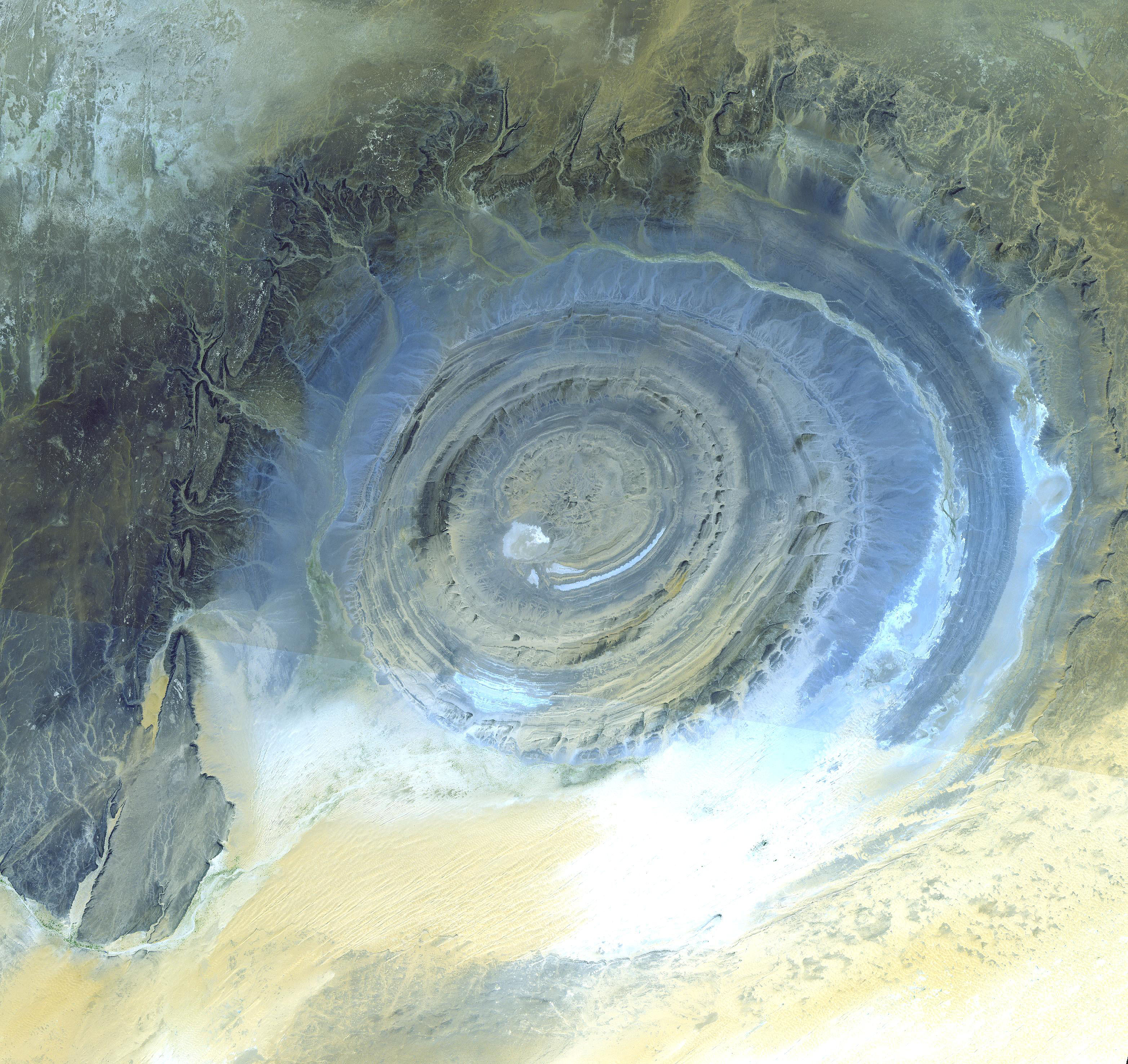
The Richat Structure in the Sahara Desert of Mauritania. Once considered to be an impact structure, it is now understood to be a geologic dome uplifted by an underlying igneous intrusion.

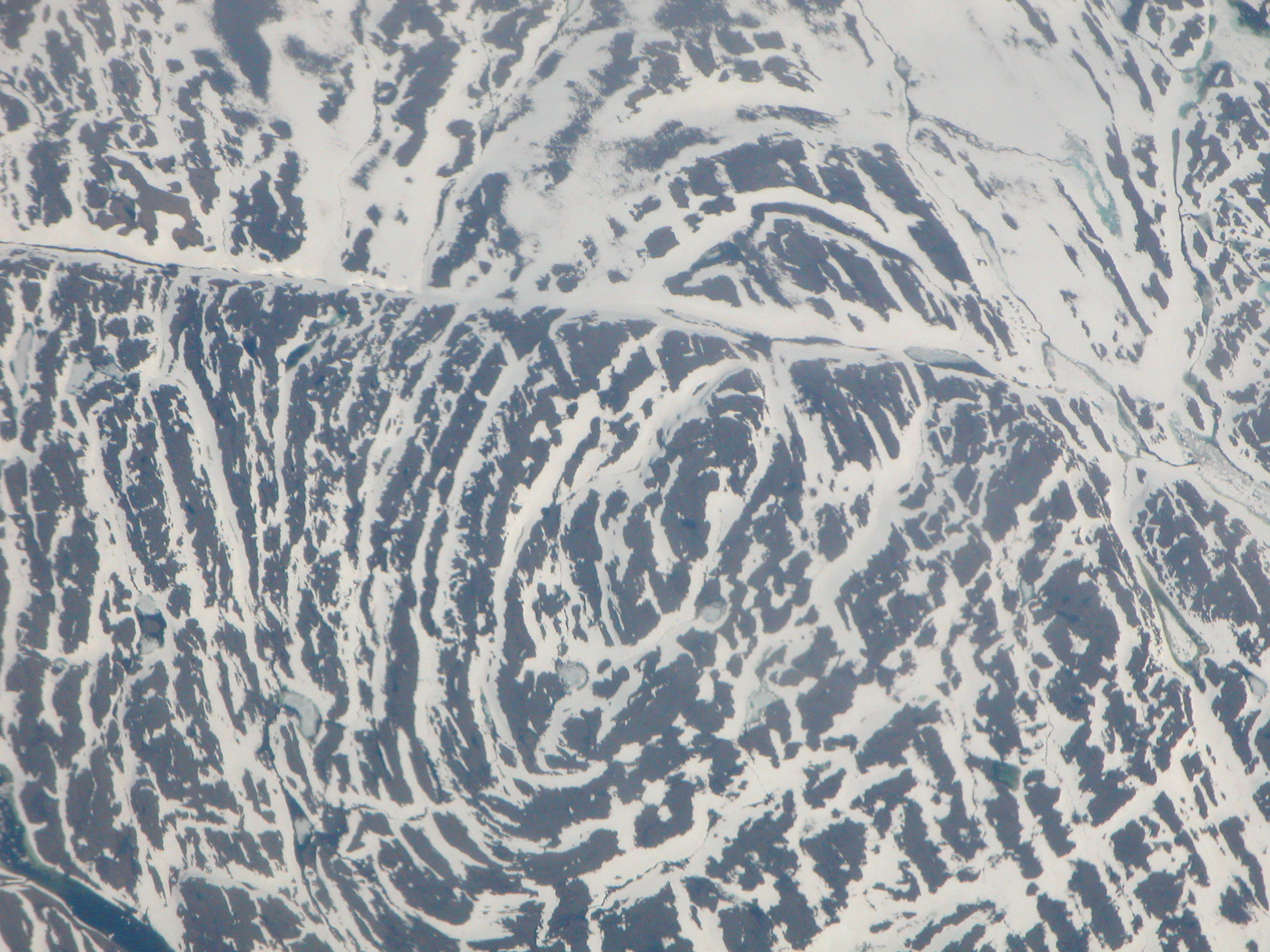
Structural dome on Baffin Island, seen in a planation surface.

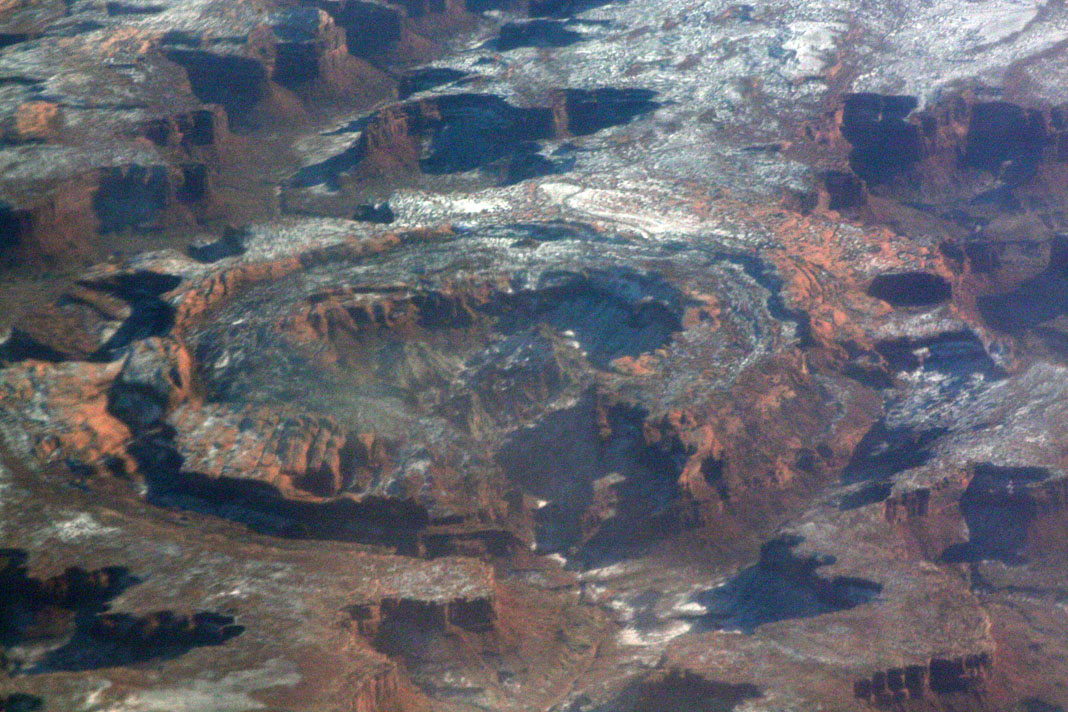
Oblique aerial photo of Upheaval Dome, Utah. Now considered to be a deeply-eroded impact crater, it was for many years believed to be a salt dome.

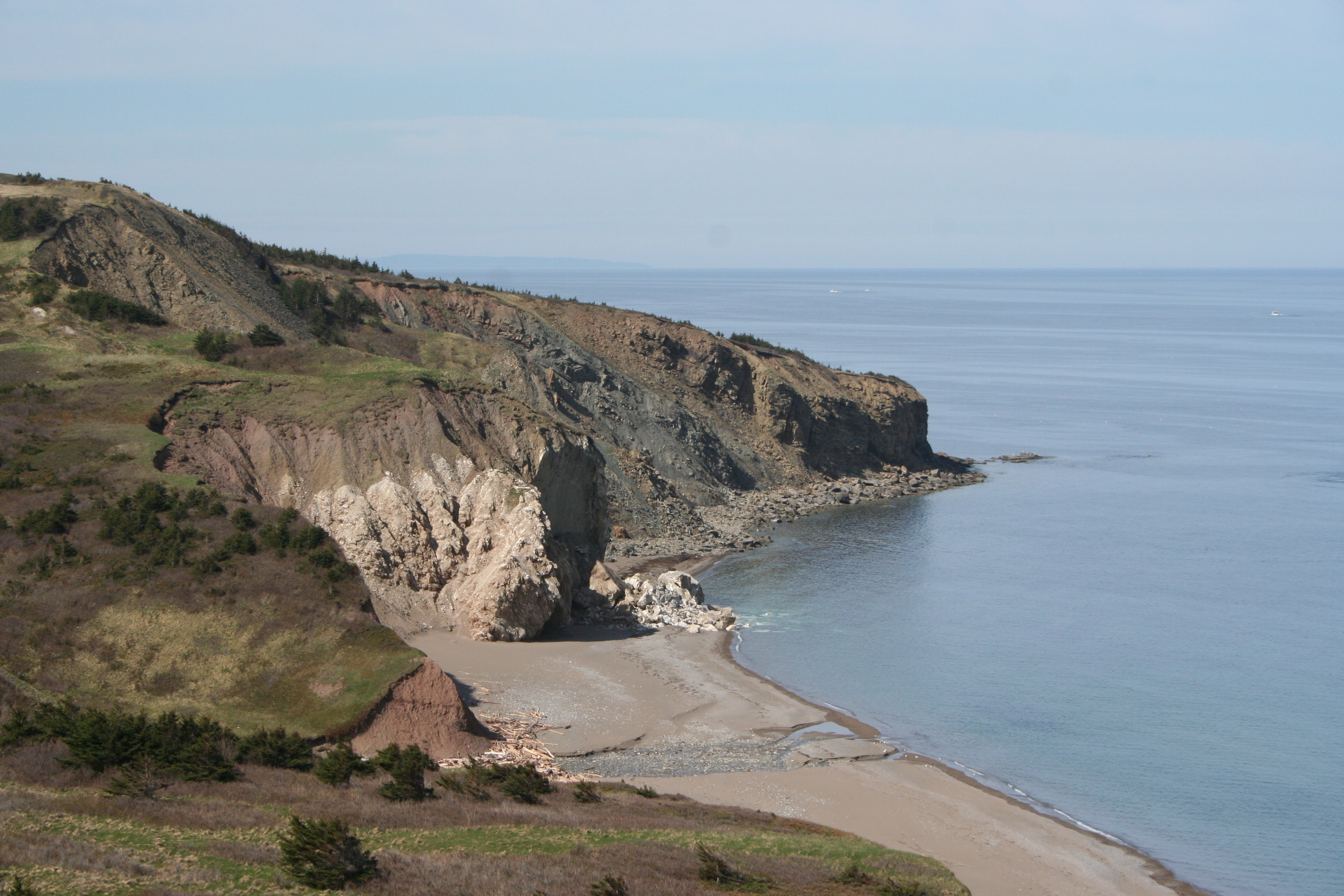
Caprock of a salt diapir at Cape Breton, Nova Scotia. The white rocks at left center are the gypsum and anhydrite carapace of the diapir.

A dome is a feature in structural geology where a circular part of the Earth's surface has been pushed upward, tilting the pre-existing layers of earth away from the center. In technical terms, it consists of symmetrical anticlines that intersect each other at their respective apices. Intact, domes are distinct, rounded, spherical-to-ellipsoidal-shaped protrusions on the Earth's surface. A slice parallel to Earth's surface of a dome features concentric rings of strata. If the top of a dome has been eroded flat, the resulting structure in plan view appears as a bullseye, with the youngest rock layers at the outside, and each ring growing progressively older moving inwards. These strata would have been horizontal at the time of deposition, then later deformed by the uplift associated with dome formation.

== Formation mechanisms ==
There are many possible mechanisms responsible for the formation of domes, the foremost of which are refolding, diapirism, igneous intrusion, and post-impact uplift.

=== Refolding ===
Structural domes can be formed by horizontal stresses in a process known as refolding, which involves the superposition, or overprinting, of two- or more fold fabrics. Upright folds formed by a horizontal primary stress in one direction can be altered by another horizontal stress oriented at 90 degrees to the original stress. This results in overprinting of the twofold fabrics, similar to wave interference patterns, that results in a system of basins and domes. Where the synclines of both fabrics are superimposed, a basin is formed; however, where the anticlines of both fabrics are superimposed, a dome is formed.

=== Diapirism ===
Diapirism involves the vertical displacement of a parcel of material through overlying strata in order to reach equilibrium within a system that has an established density gradient (see Rayleigh–Taylor instability). To reach equilibrium, parcels from a stratum composed of less-dense material will rise towards Earth's surface, creating formations that are most often expressed in cross-section as "tear drop"-shaped, where the rounded end is that closest to the surface of the overlying strata. If overlying strata are weak enough to deform as the parcel rises, a dome can form; in cases where the overlying strata are particularly devoid of resistance to applied stress, the diapir may penetrate through the strata altogether and erupt on the surface. Potential materials comprised by these less-dense strata include salt (which is highly incompressible, thus creating the structural instability that leads to diapirism when buried under deposited strata and subject to overlying stress) and partially melted migmatite (a metamorphic-texture rock frequently found in domes due to the typical involvement of heat and/or pressure with their formation).

=== Igneous intrusion ===
The intrusion of magma into layered sedimentary rocks and the resulting formation of laccoliths or igneous stocks can also create domes. In the case of laccoliths, this happens when the vertical movement magma stops at the base of particular sedimentary layer or layers and starts to spread laterally away from the pipe of ascending magma. As the magma flows laterally from the pipe of magma feeding it, a mushroom-shaped mass of magma is formed. This causes the overlying layers of sedimentary rock to bulge upward like a giant blister and deform into a dome.

=== Post-impact uplift ===
A complex crater, caused by collision of a hypervelocity body with another larger than itself, is typified by the presence of a dome at the centre of the site of impact. These domes are typically large-scale (on the magnitude of tens of metres) and thought to be the result of post-impact weakening of the overlying strata and basement. Weakening is integral for the vertical uplift required to create a dome to take place, as it allows vertical displacement to happen unconstrained by the original rigidity properties of the undeformed rock. This displacement is the result of the parcel of rock at the centre of the site of impact, composed of the strata and basement, re-equilibrating relative to gravity. Earlier theories attributed the dome-forming uplift to rebound; however, this would imply that the rock deforms elastically. Elastic deformation is not likely being that an impact is accompanied by extensive fracturing and partial melting of the rock that would change the mechanical properties of the rock.

== Examples ==
=== Structural domes ===
- Observed in the Karatau fault system, Kazakhstan
- North Pole Dome, Western Australia (in the Pilbara Craton)

=== Diapiric domes ===
- Gorleben salt dome, Lüchow-Dannenberg district in the far north-east of Lower Saxony, Germany.
- Leo Pargil Dome, Himachal Pradesh/Tibetan border

=== Igneous intrusion domes ===
- Henry Mountains, Utah
- Richat Structure, central Mauritania; possible impact structure

=== Impact structures ===
- Upheaval Dome, Utah, USA
- Vredefort Dome, South Africa

== See also ==
- Dome illusion
