= Tenoumer crater =

Impact crater in Mauritania

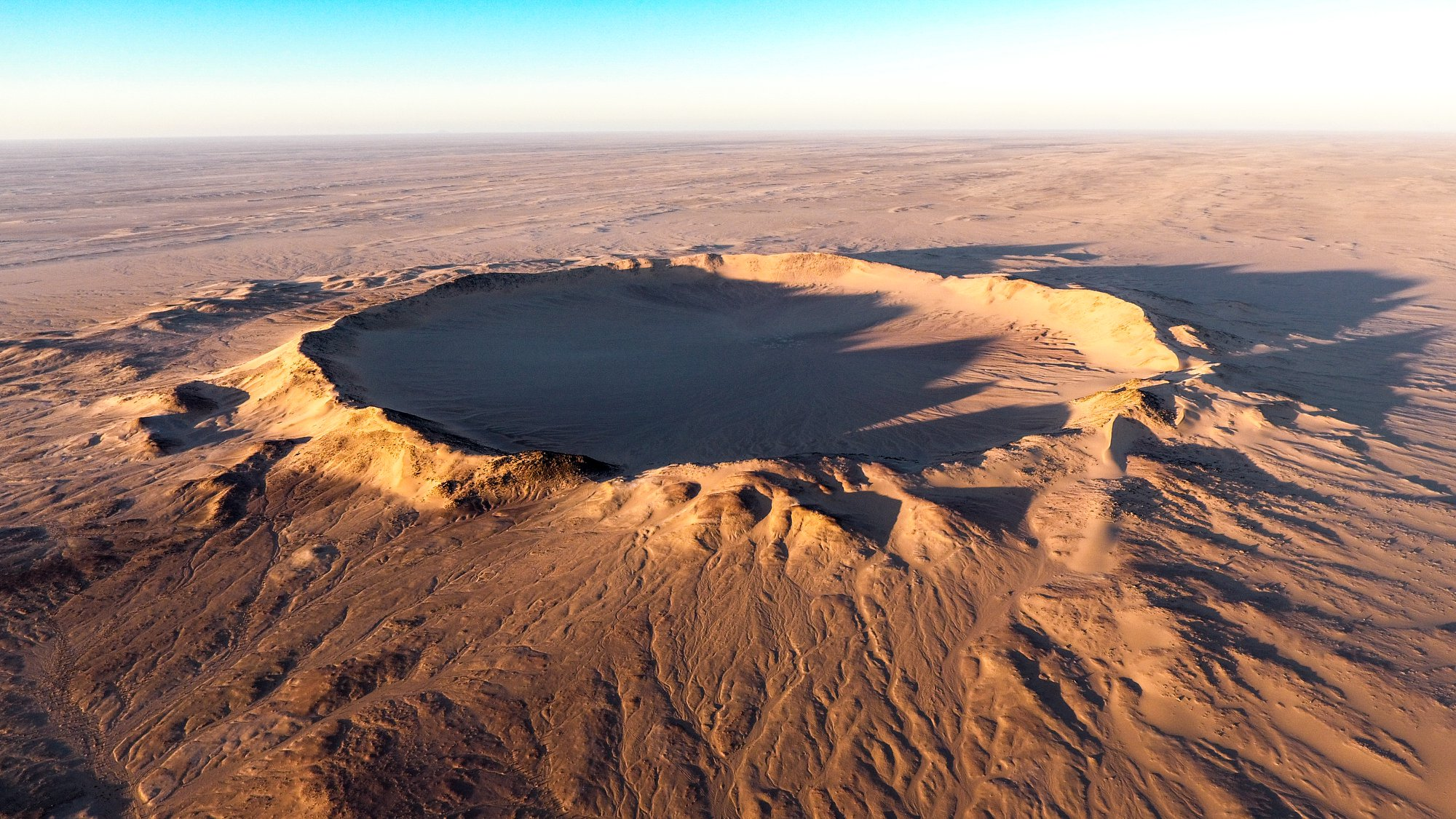

- Location within Africa
- Location: Mauritania; 22°55′5″N 10°24′27″W

Impact crater structure
- Confidence: Confirmed
- Diameter: 1.9 km (1.2 mi)
- Depth: 110 m (360 ft) (currently exposed); 300 to 400 m (980 to 1,310 ft) (originally)
- Age: 21,400 ± 9,700

Tenoumer is a probable impact crater in Mauritania.

== Details ==
The crater is located in the western Sahara Desert. It is 1.9 km (1.2 mi) in diameter and its age was estimated to be 21,400 ± 9,700 years old but as of 2016, is thought to be ~1.57 Ma.

The crater is exposed at the surface and is nearly circular. Edges of the crater rise up to 110 m (360 ft) high above the base of the crater, but the bottom of the crater is covered with an approximately 200 to 300 m (660 to 980 ft) thick layer of sediments.

Tenoumer crater has formed in gneiss and granite of Precambrian peneplain with a thin layer of Pliocene sediments (no older). The crater is believed to be caused by an impact event due to basement rocks found outside the crater. A volcanic origin was once theorized because of the discovery of basalt and rhyodacite outside of the crater basin, but current evidence clearly indicates an impact origin.
