= Río Cuarto craters =

Purported impact craters in Argentina

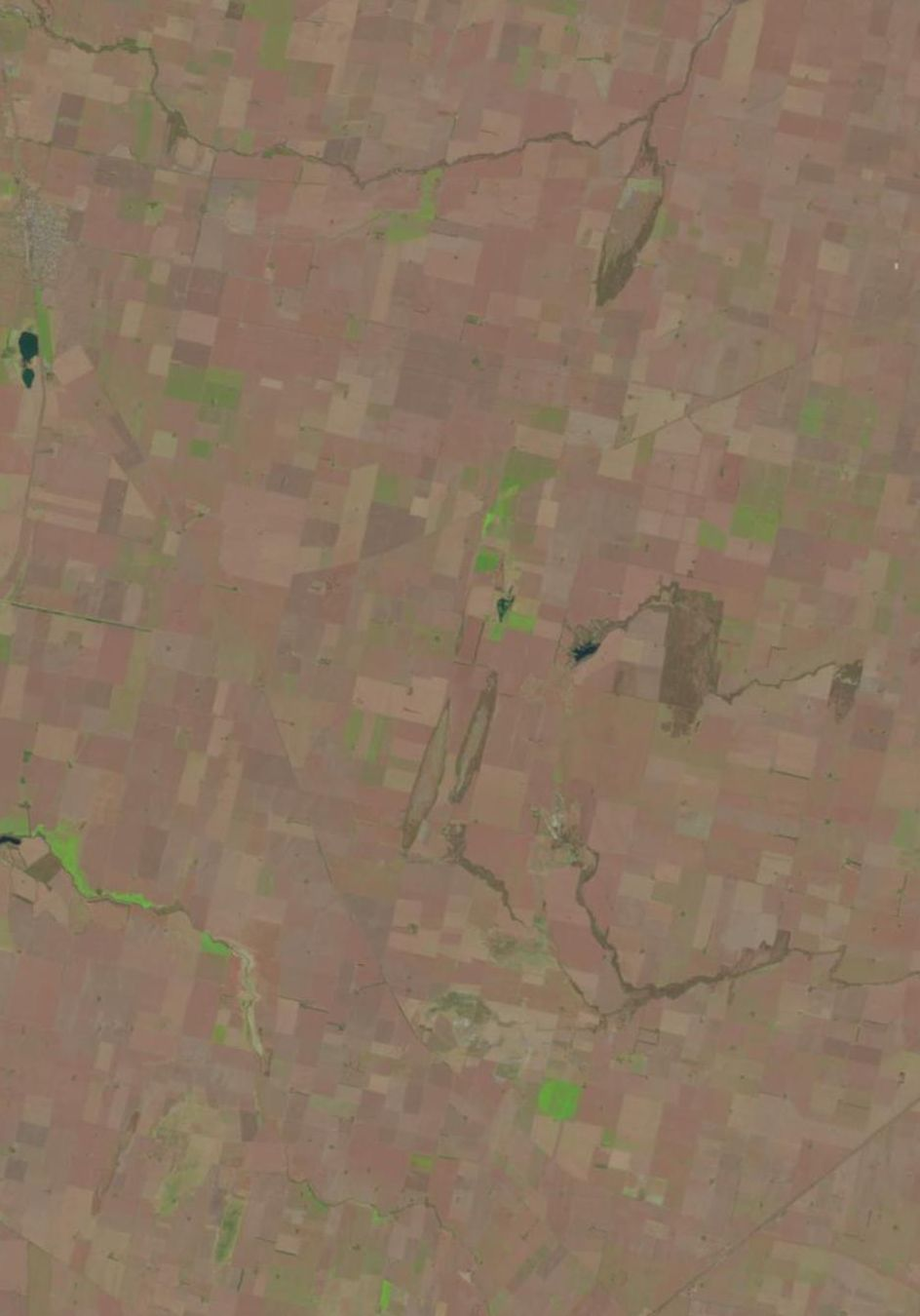
- Landsat image of the craters in 2010

- Location within Argentina
- Location: Río Cuarto, Córdoba, Argentina; 32°52.7′S 64°13.4′W

Impact crater structure
- Confidence: Confirmed, contested.
- Diameter: 4.5 km (2.8 mi)
- Age: <100,000 or <10,000 years Late Pleistocene or Holocene
- Exposed: Yes
- Drilled: No
- Bolide type: Chondrite

The Río Cuarto craters are a set of ten elongate, rimmed depressions that lie within the Pampas of Córdoba Province, (central Argentina). These depressions are aligned and distributed along a northeast to southwest trending line for a distance of 50 km (31 mi). They are the most prominent and well preserved of hundreds of other similarly elongate and aligned depressions found on the Argentinian Pampas. Schultz and others argue that these ten depressions are a cluster of a primary and its associated secondary impact craters that were created by an unusual very low angle meteoroid (less than 7°) impact and its fragmentation that occurred less than 10,000 years ago. Although often included in official catalogues of Earth impact features, their impact origin remains controversial as a model for their origin as terrestrial aeolian landforms has been proposed and is also well regarded in the scientific literature.

== Discovery and investigation ==
The Río Cuarto craters were brought to the attention of Peter Schultz by R. E. Lianza, a captain in the Argentine Air Force. In October 1989, while piloting a twin-engine aircraft to a test flight center near the city of Cordoba, he observed the first of these elongate, rimmed depressions that sharply contrast with the surrounding cultivated fields. His immediate thought was it might be a huge oblique impact crater. The next day, while piloting an Argentine-built jet trainer, he observed additional elongate, rimmed, symmetrical depressions. He noted that these depressions looked strikingly similar to impact craters produced in laboratory simulations of impacts taking place at low angles.

Later, Lianza contacted the editors of Sky and Telescope about his observations and was put in contact with Peter Schultz. In 1991, Schultz organized an official field investigation of these depressions. The group studying these depressions consisted of Peter Schultz (coauthor), John Grant (a field geologist), William Collins (a technician), Lianza, Alejandro Toselli (meteorite specialist from Tucuman University), an unnamed graduate student (Tucuman University), and a small group of local volunteers. they examined Argentine Air Force aerial photography in the office and examined, mapped, described, and collected samples from these depressions.

After their field work had been completed, it was found that South American geologists had previously observed, described and mapped the Rio Cuarto craters long before Lianza first saw them. These geologists observed that hundreds of similar depressions occur widely across the Pampas in the provinces of Córdoba, San Luis, La Pampa, and Buenos Aires of Argentina. These geologists explained these landforms as having been created by either water- or wind-driven processes.

== Description ==
Only ten of the oblong depressions out of the hundreds found on the Pampas of the Rio Cuarto Department were proposed to be impact craters by Schulz and others. The ten depressions that comprise the Rio Cuarto craters have well-developed rims and 4:1 length-to-width ratios. They are clustered together within a 50 km (31 mi) long corridor that lies just north of the Rio Cuarto River and the city of Rio Cuarto, Argentina. Eight of these landforms lie within a 50 km (31 mi) long corridor that is 2 km (1.2 mi) wide.

The largest and northernmost of the ten depressions is 1.1 km (0.68 mi) wide by 4.3 km (2.7 mi) long. The rims at its ends are poorly defined and low. Its side rims are well-defined and rise 3–7 m (9.8–23.0 ft) above the surrounding Pampas. Its interior lies 7 m (23 ft) below the surrounding Pampas. Lying about 11 km (6.8 mi) to the southwest are a smaller pair of depressions which are both 0.7 km (0.43 mi) wide by 03.5 km (2.2 mi) long. Their rims are also poorly defined and low at their ends. Their side rims also are well-defined and rise 3–7 m (9.8–23.0 ft) above the surrounding Pampas and their interior lie 7 m (23 ft) below the surrounding Pampas. Lying 5 km (3.1 mi) further to the southwest along trend of the pair of depressions are three more smaller depressions that are 0.1–0.3 km (0.062–0.186 mi) wide. Two more possibly related depressions occur 30 km (19 mi) southwest of the northern rim of the largest depression.

== Geology ==
The depressions of the Rio Cuarto craters are incised into 25–50 m (82–164 ft) of loess that accumulated during the Pleistocene. The loess blankets crystalline, metamorphic bedrock of the Sierra de Cordoba. The closest bedrock exposures occur 30 km (19 mi) to the northwest.

== Impact origin ==
Based solely on the field study of the morphology of these depressions, Schultz and others conclude that these landforms have certainly been modified by both wind and water. They also note the lack of specific morphological and structural evidence, such as overturned strata, that unambiguously demonstrate their extraterrestrial origin. In addition, it is admitted that regionally within the Pampas considerable evidence exists for aeolian reworking and the occurrence of innumerable deflation basins similar to Rio Cuarto craters. As a result, they concede that these depressions could easily be interpreted as aeolian in origin. However, they conclude that the unusual distribution and striking resemblance of these depressions to oblique clustered impacts modeled in laboratory experiments are compelling evidence of their extraterrestrial impact origin. Furthermore in a brief personal communication cited in a 2014 paper by Beech, Schultz insists that these landforms do have a distinct morphology that they follow a linear orientation pattern instead of the curved or arching alignments displayed by aeolian depressions. Finally, Schultz and others argue that fragments of chondrite meteorites and numerous pieces of glassy impactites found in and near the Rio Cuarto craters provide conclusive proof of their extraterrestrial origin.

== Aeolian origin theory ==
Although the ten depressions that comprise the Rio Cuarto craters are included in many lists of impact crates, the theory of their creation by extraterrestrial impact processes remains controversial. Other Earth scientists. argue that they are entirely terrestrial in origin. They contend, in contrast to Schulz, that these depressions are no different from hundreds of aeolian landforms within the greater Pampean that are aligned with prehistoric wind patterns. These landforms, like the Rio Cuarto craters, are elongate scars with high length-to-width ratios and have identical northeast to southwest orientations.

=== Glassy impactites ===
The glassy impactites found in the area of the Rio Cuarto and later elsewhere in the Argentine Pampas are homogeneous and have compositions reflecting local loess. The glassy impactites have yielded evidence of shock metamorphism such as diaplectic glass, lechatelierite, rare grains of shocked quartz, baddeleyite, silica glass, evidence of rapid quenching, and low water content. Finally, some of the glassy impactites have high chromium, nickel, and iron contents, which suggests incorporation of material from an impacting meteorite.

The glassy impactites that Schulz and others directly associated with Rio Cuarto craters are now known to occur throughout a large area of the Argentine Pampas. Furthermore, Ar–Ar dating of these impactites represent multiple impacts that occurred at various times during the Miocene to Holocene Periods. Ar–Ar dating of fresh looking glassy impactites found in and around the Rio Cuarto craters yielded an age of 6,000±2,000 BP. However, noticeably weathered glassy impactites found in and around the Rio Cuarto craters have yielded Ar–Ar ages of 114,000±26,000 BP and 570,000±100,000 BP. The source crater of these glassy impactites and their relationship remains doubtful or unknown. The resolution of these questions requires more detailed research.

=== Meteorites ===
In 1992, Schultz and others regarded an "iron-rich rock" collected from the Rio Cuarto craters to be the important piece of evidence for their impact origin. When cut open, this rock and another revealed a distinctive texture that demonstrated that both are fusion crusted chondritic meteorites. It was stated that they were more than a "smoking gun" but instead "part of the bullet" that created these ten depressions.

Since 1992, the total number of meteorites reported from the depressions that comprise the Rio Cuarto craters has risen to five ordinary chondrite meteorites and one achondrite meteorites. Bland and others report terrestrial residency ages of 36,000 years for one of the chondrite meteorites and 52,000 years for the only achondrite meteorite. Later analyses by Levine and others estimated a terrestrial residency age of 410,000 years for the single achondrite meteorite and deduced that this meteorite came from a pre-impact body no larger than about 1 m (3.3 ft) in diameter. Radionuclide analysis of three of the Rio Cuarto chondrite meteorites yielded cosmic ray exposure (CRE) ages of 3.5, 8.0 and 12.2 million years for the meteorites. The same radionuclide analysis further revealed that they are derived from three different parent bodies that would have been no larger than a few meters across and each parent body having fell to Earth in as a separate meteorite fall. Thus, the five meteorites collected from the Rio Cuarto craters are neither part of a single impactor, involved in a single impact or crater forming event, nor evidence of such an event. In addition, the meteorite specimens and associated data neither supports nor disproves an impact origin for the Rio Cuarto craters. However, it is consistent with the accumulation of meteorites with a range of compositions and terrestrial ages from separate meteorite falls over a period of time and their concentration into a surface lag by the removal of soil and sediment by aeolian deflation.

== Summary ==
Beech concludes that, although the counterarguments towards the impact origin of the Rio Cuarto craters is potentially powerful, more data needs to be collected by field work about these depressions before their origin can be determined with any confidence. In addition, he contends in order to resolve the origin of the Rio Cuarto craters that the geochronology, geomorphology, and sedimentology of the near-by aeolian depressions needs to be also thoroughly studied and understood.
