= Tourism in Mauritania =

In 2010's, Mauritania visited by 1,500 tourists each year. This number is extremely low relative to size of local population. In late May 2019 total local population of Mauritania stood at 4,077,000 inhabitants. This gives a ratio of 1 tourist for every 2,718 locals.

Along with some on the ancient settlements listed below, other tourist highlights in the Mauritanian Sahara include the Richat Structure just beyond Ouadane, Fort Saganne, the nearby Amojjar Pass and the sandy Tifoujar Pass; Terjit oasis and the medieval ruins of Ksar el Barka.

== History ==
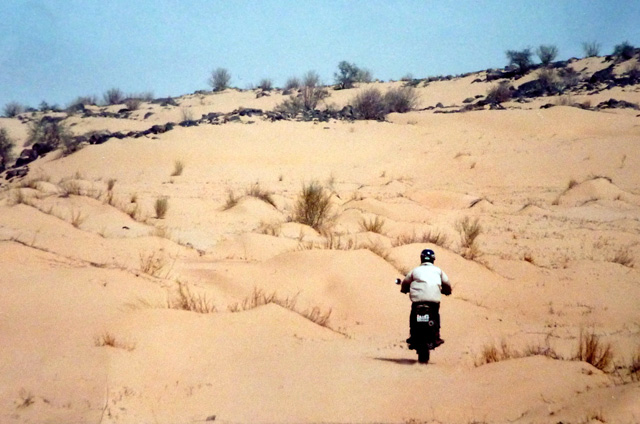

Following Mauritania’s independence from France in 1960, at which time the vast majority of the country was still nomadic, European tourism developed slowly. In part this was attributable to the Western Sahara War in which Mauritania was briefly engaged, but the driving distance from Europe was also a factor when compared to Algeria whose profile similarly benefitted from the rise of the original Paris-Dakar rally in the early 1980s. Around the same time in France, a TV show by desert doyen Théodore Monod (who'd travelled widely in Mauritania with camels from the 1930s), also helped raise the country's profile.

It was the 1991 ceasefire with the Polisario Front along with the escalating Algerian Civil War of the 1990s which saw the so-called Atlantic Route open up to trade and tourism, when Algeria and its trans-Saharan routes closed. Initially Moroccan army convoys loosely escorted travelers, which included a healthy trade in used cars from Dakhla, Western Sahara to the Moroccan border with Mauritania. Once in Mauritania one drove across the sands to Nouadhibou where local guides were needed to travel the desert and beach piste to the capital, Nouakchott.

In 1999, Trailblazer Guides published the original, 650-page edition of Sahara Overland which included several routes in Mauritania. Similar route guides were available in French and German, with many more books in French describing the geography of the country.

Some intrepid travelers hitched a ride (or loaded their cars) eastwards on the Mauritania Railway which brought iron ore to Nouadhibou from the mines inland at Zouerat. From Choum this provided access to Atar, at the foot of the Adrar plateau, scenically and culturally the gateway to Mauritania’s touristic heartland.

Around the turn of the millennium the completion of a new inland road linking Nouadhibou with Nouakchott (the first sealed road to cross the Sahara from north to south), as well as the advent of inexpensive charter flights from France directly to Atar by Point-Afrique, helped inexpensive fly-in tourism gain a foothold in Mauritania. A shocking set back, especially among French visitors, was the murder of the Tollet family and their guide near Aleg on Christmas Eve, 2007 which led to the cancellation of the Dakar Rally (and its eventual relocation to South America). Then in November and December 2009 two kidnappings set things still further. In fact, tourist traffic from Moroccan Western Sahara never stopped, despite over-cautious travel advice issued by the European government foreign ministries.

In 2018, the improvement of the security situation saw the resumption of the renamed Le Point Voyages charter flights to Atar. Featured on French television, it was hoped to kickstart a revival of desert tourism in Mauritania’s Adrar region, although the current climate in the Sahara makes it unlikely tourism will quickly return to their brief heyday. The Mauritanian Army make sure the largely desolate far north and east of the country remain off limits to regular tourists. As it is these places were virtually never visited by tourists, except by some trans-Saharan expeditions in less volatile times.

== Ancient cities ==
The old cities of Ouadane, Chinguetti, Oualata, Tichitt, Ksar el Barka, Aoudaghost and Koumbi Saleh are all vestiges of a rich past during the apogee of the trans-Saharan trade from Black Africa. Many of these cities developed into religious and cultural centers of learning.

The expansion of Europeans maritime trading saw to the decline these once great cities.

== Chinguetti ==
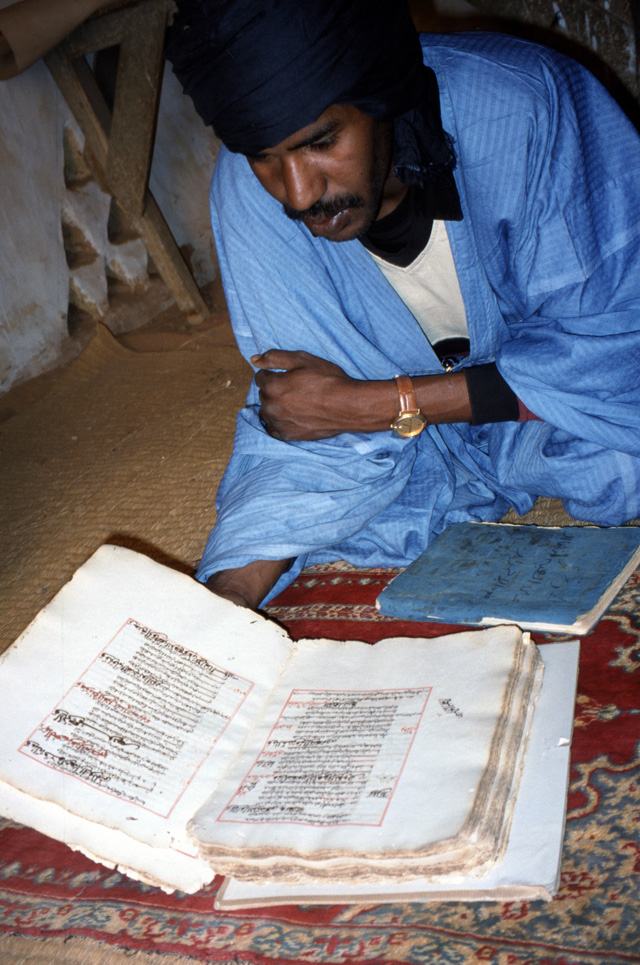

Chinguetti is 86 km from Atar, 90 km and 128 km from Ouadane, along the plateau track.

Regarded as the 7th Holy City of Islam, Chinguetti was a religious center and famous for its many Koranic schools and universities. The city also played a significant commercial role during the camel trading era.

The influence of Chinguetti largely exceeded the borders of current Mauritania, with scholars renowned as far as the Orient. Mauritania was once known as the "Bilad Chenguetti " – the Land of Chinguetti which reached its apogee during the 17th and 18th centuries.

In the 1970s the town was shot up during an attack by Polisario guerrillas which contributed to Mauritania withdrawing from that conflict.

Today the older south side of the town is partly ruined or buried under dunes, but it still offers an impressive spectacle to the visitor. Some old buildings, including the 13th-century mosque with its rectangular minaret still survive in the old city,

The libraries or 'document repositories' of Chinguetti contain hundreds of invaluable and well-preserved medieval manuscripts, detailing commercial transactions, aspects of Koranic law and scientific observations.

== Ouadane ==
Ouadane is 128 km from Chinguetti and 180 km from Atar.

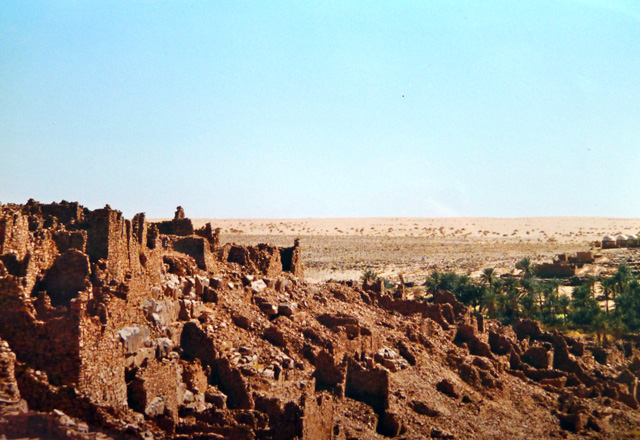

Ouadane, or the city of the "two oueds" is an ancient settlement whose foundation dates back to 1140. In the following centuries it flourished caravan city on the Trans-Saharan trade from Timbuktu when it was the most significant city of the Mauritanian Sahara, renowned for its palm groves, mosques and libraries. In the 17th century the city was visited by the Portuguese who established trade links and at which time Ouadane reached its apogee. Its decline started when European mariners saw to the diversion of sub-Saharan trade from the end of the 17th century.

UNESCO classifies the city as part of the World Inheritance to humanity. Perched on an escarpment covered in ruined stone buildings, Ouadane evokes the past glories of the Sahara.

Recommended places to visit: the old mosque, the palm plantation, the old city and the Richat Structure as well as the meteorite studied by Theodore Monod, El Beyedh, the mysterious Armakou Pass and the fort of El Ghallaouya.

== Oualata ==
Oualata is 90 km north of Néma, an old city and is famous for its bas relief mural decorations. Paintings with various motifs decorate the houses.

Oualata was an active city during the Middle Ages. It was built on the site of Birou in the 11th century. It was a caravan city on the trade route from Timbuktu.

== Tichit ==
Tichit is an isolated but historic town, 230 km east of Tidjikja and 490 km from Nema along the sandy Dhar Tichit piste.

Tichit's history dates back to the 12th century when it was a commercial metropolis on the Saharan trade. The city was also famous for its libraries and for its 700-year-old mosque. Venetian glass beads have been found here, traded during the medieval era.
