= Erg Amatlich =

- Erg
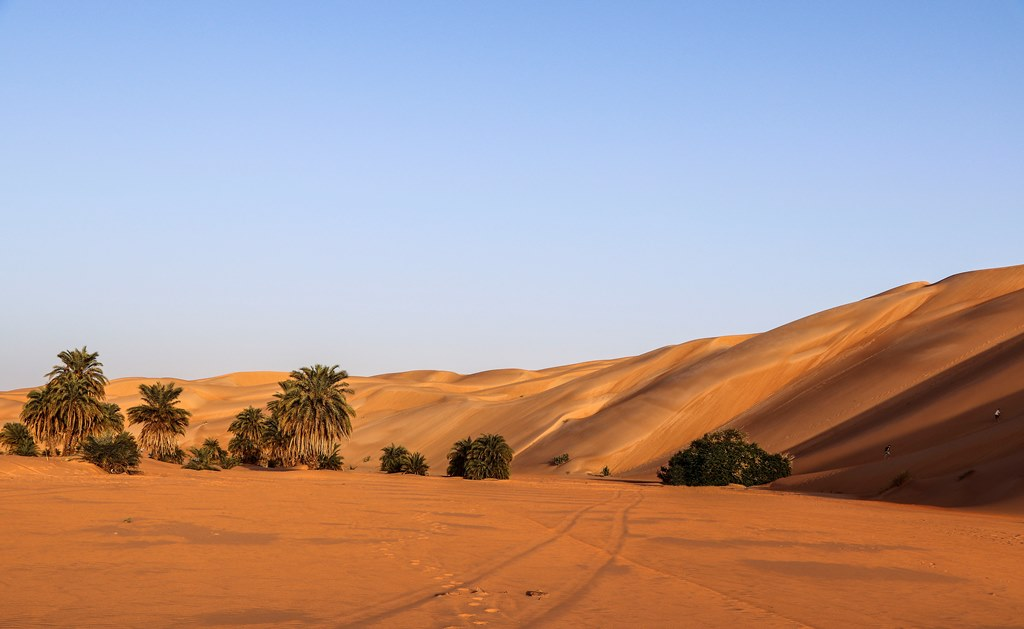
- Sand dune in erg Amatlich
- Interactive map of Erg Amatlich
- Coordinates: 19°24′N 14°10′W
- Country: Mauritania
- Elevation: 100 m (330 ft)

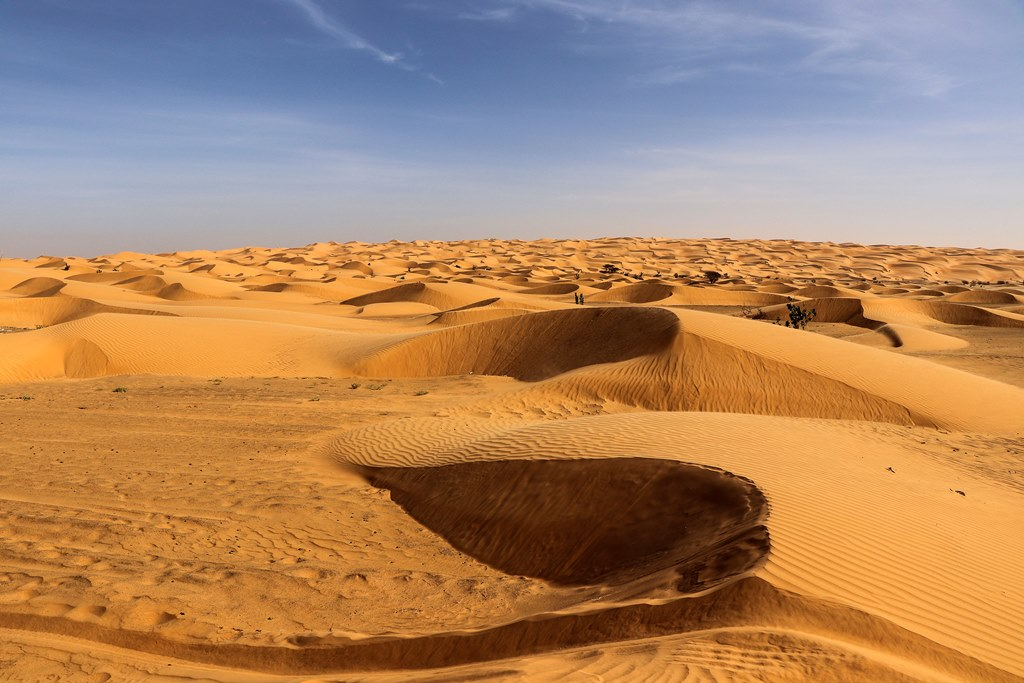

Located south-west of the city of Atar in Mauritania, erg Amatlich is a vast dune barrier of small dimensions (130 km x 5 km to 8 km) trapped between the mountains of the Adrar plateau. The erg, stretching from NW to SE, originates at the cliffs of the Tifoujar Pass and extends to the Akjoujt area where it takes the name of Dkhaïna extending to the Atlantic Ocean.

In addition to endless dunes, Erg Amatlich gathers a great variety of Saharan landscapes such as canyons, cliffs, cultivable basins and palm groves like Azoueïga, located on the west side of the erg.

There are many Neolithic sites, such as the Khatt Lemaiteg.

== Climate ==
Erg Amatlich

Climate chart (precipitation, max. and min. temperature)
J	F	M	A	M	J	J	A	S	O	N	D
1 27 13	1 30 15	1 36 17	4 41 21	1 43 23	1 42 23	8 39 24	57 37 25	28 38 24	1 41 23	3 35 17	1 29 12
- █ Average max. and min. temperatures in °C
- █ Precipitation totals in mm
- Source: NASA
Imperial conversion
J	F	M	A	M	J	J	A	S	O	N	D
0 81 55	0 86 59	0 97 63	0.2 106 70	0 109 73	0 108 73	0.3 102 75	2.2 99 77	1.1 100 75	0 106 73	0.1 95 63	0 84 54
- █ Average max. and min. temperatures in °F
- █ Precipitation totals in inches
