= Amazmaz =

Cliff and rock paintings in Mauritania

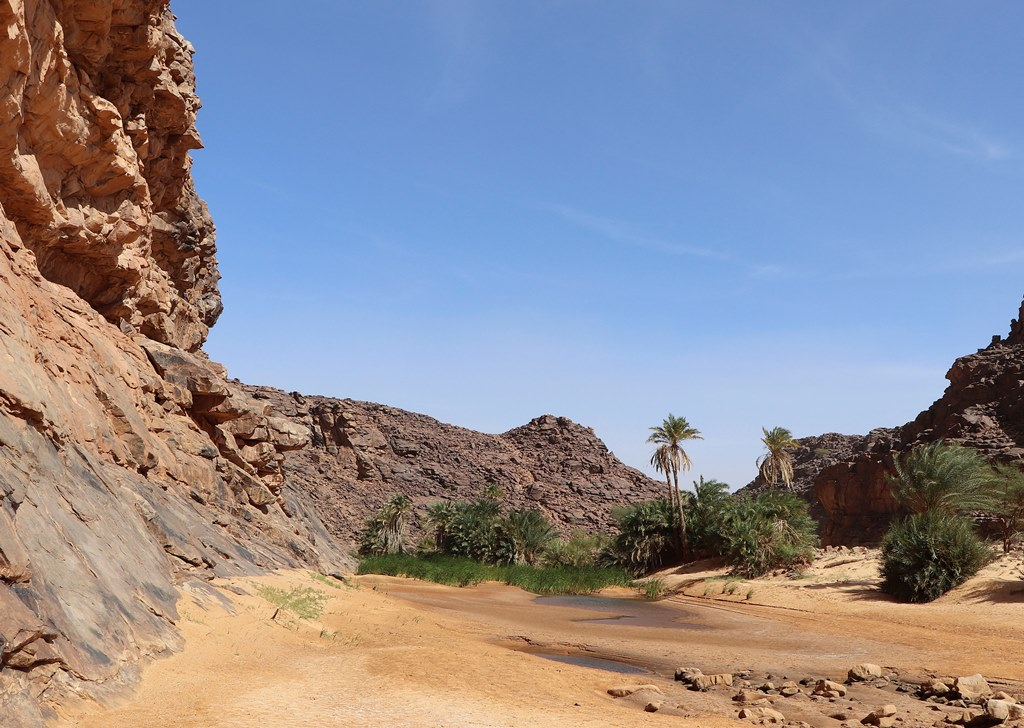
- Gueltas of Amazmaz

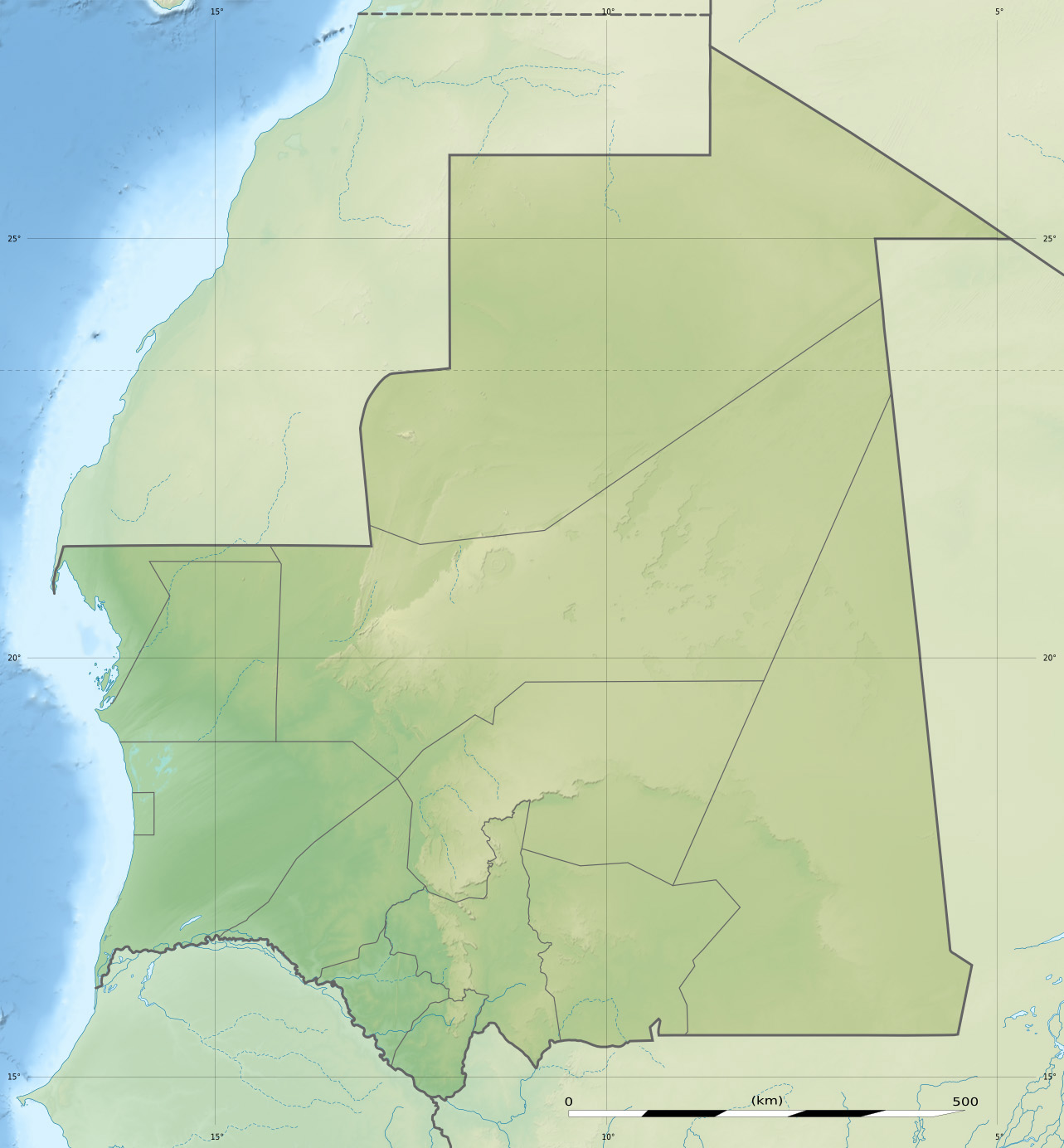
- Location within Mauritania
- 19°43′00″N 13°26′00″W
- Periods: Neolithic
- Location: Adrar plateau
- Region: Adrar, Mauritania

Amazmaz is an isolated elevation with steep slopes in the western part of the Adrar plateau in Mauritania, 400 km northeast of the capital Nouakchott.

== Rock paintings of the Amazmaz gueltas ==
At the foot of the hill there are the gueltas of Amazmaz, a chain of ponds, hidden among rocks and surrounded by rushes, but used for thousands of years, as evidenced by the rock paintings on the slopes bordering the waters.

== Gallery ==
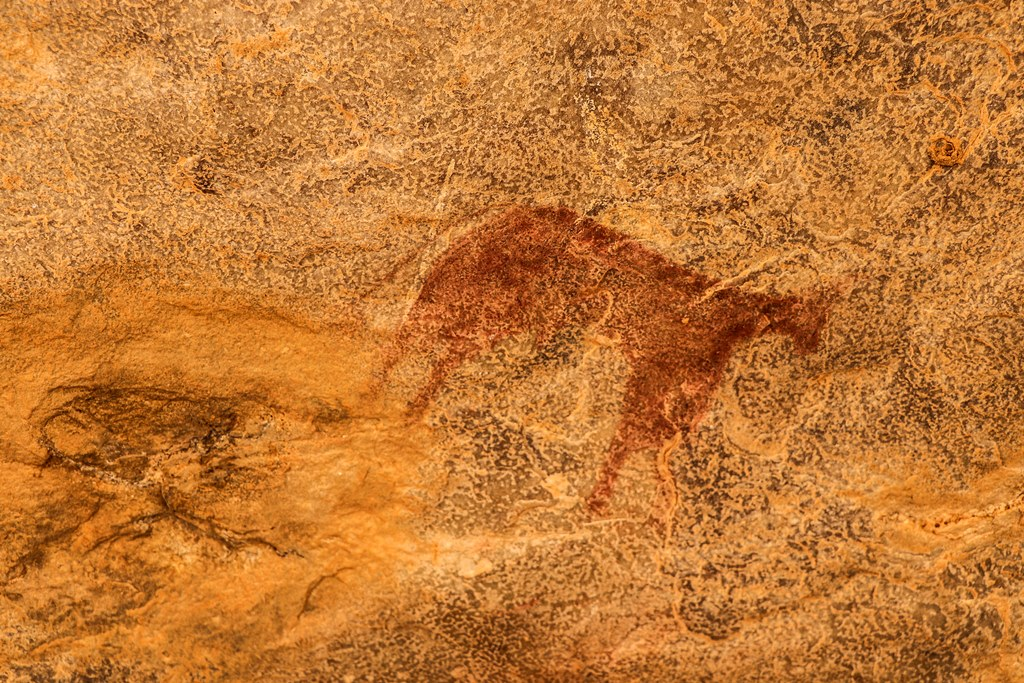
Rock painting of a bovine

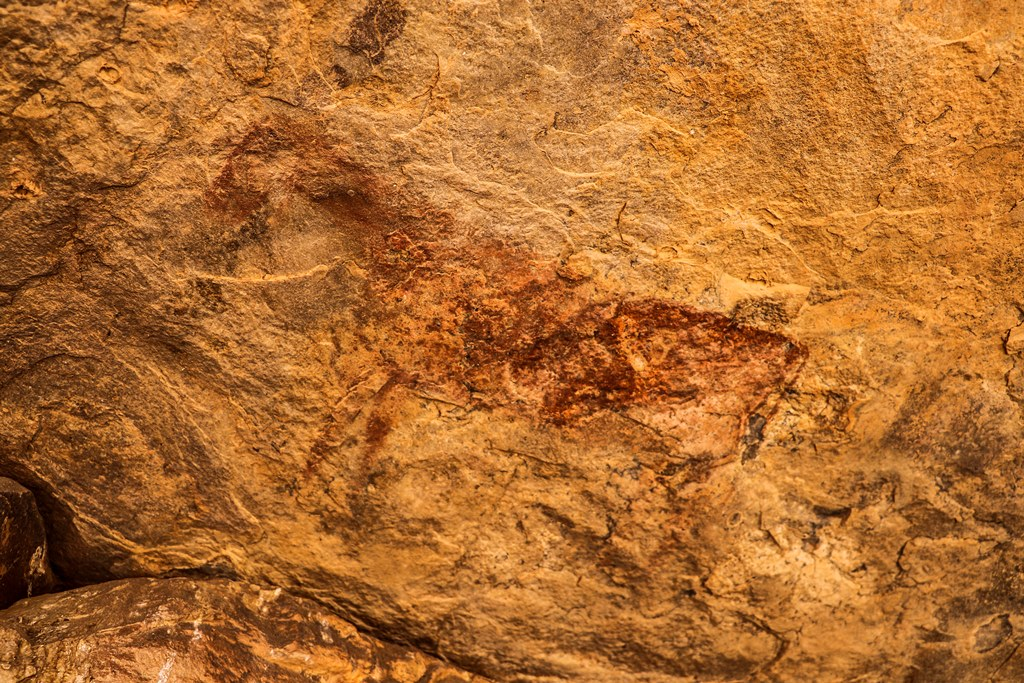
Rock painting of a bovine

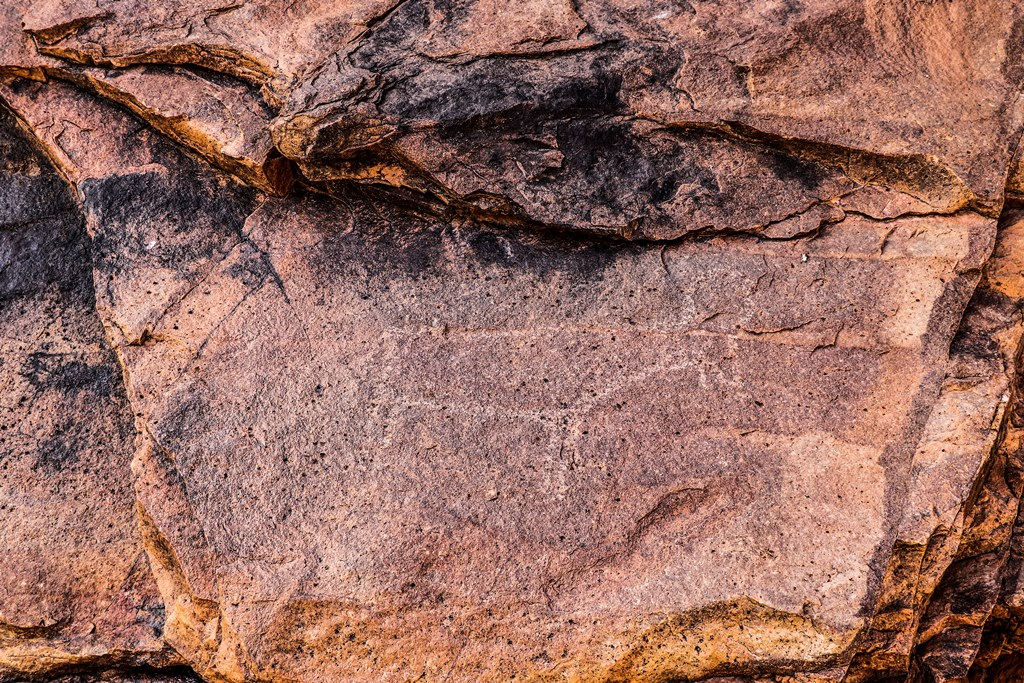
Rock engraving of a bovine
