= Bloody Creek crater =

- Location within Nova Scotia
- Location: Nova Scotia, Canada; 44°45′00″N 65°14′30″W

Impact crater structure
- Confidence: Probable
- Diameter: 420 m × 350 m (1,380 ft × 1,150 ft)
- Age: Neogene or younger in age
- Exposed: Submerged beneath Dalhousie Lake
- Drilled: No

Bloody Creek crater, which is also known as the Bloody Creek structure, is a 420-by-350-meter (1,380 by 1,150 ft) in diameter elliptical feature that is located in southwestern Nova Scotia, Canada. It is argued to be either a possible extraterrestrial impact crater or an impact structure. It lies between Bridgetown and West Dalhousie, Annapolis County, Nova Scotia, where the Bloody Creek structure straddles what was once a stretch of Bloody Creek. It also is informally known as the Astrid crater.

== History ==
The Bloody Creek structure was discovered by George R. Stevens, a retired geologist from Acadia University, in 1987 during a regional air photo survey. By the time of its discovery, it had been submerged beneath a reservoir, Dalhousie Lake. Dalhousie Lake was created by a dam constructed across Bloody Creek by the Nova Scotia Power Corporation as part of the Bloody Creek Reservoir hydroelectric development. As a result, the collection of rock samples from crater rim and its surroundings required the use of scuba gear and visiting the site during the occasional periods when the reservoir was drained. When the surface of Dalhousie Lake was frozen, the thick ice created a platform that greatly facilitated magnetometer and ground-penetrating radar surveys of this feature. Prior to being flooded, the interior of the Bloody Creek structure consisted of a fen within the floodplain of Bloody Creek.

== Surface geology ==
The Bloody Creek structure lies within the Southern Upland of southwestern Nova Scotia. The Southern Upland consists of poorly drained, gently-rolling, hilly topography that is characterized by glacially deranged drainages and extensive lakes and wetlands. A large granite batholith, which has intruded slate and greywacke, underlies the Southern Uplands. Within this region, bedrock is poorly exposed as the result of low relief; a widespread surficial blanket of glacial till; and numerous large depressions filled with either wetland peat or occupied by lakes. The blanket of glacial till is relatively thin, typically less than 5 meters (16 ft) thick, and consists of loose sandy sediment that contains an abundance of locally derived angular cobbles and boulders. The exposed bedrock has been glacially sculpted and polished. At the site of the Bloody Creek structure and elsewhere in the region, roches moutonnées and lee-side plucking features can be seen.

== Bedrock geology ==
The Bloody Creek structure lies entirely within deeply eroded outcrops of granitic rock of the Scrag Lake pluton. This pluton has an exposed area of approximately 2,460 km^{2} (950 sq mi). It forms much of the western end of the South Mountain Batholith. The pluton is composed primarily of megacrystic biotite monzogranite and lesser amounts of megacrystic biotite granodiorite. Contacts between the primary biotite monzogranite and the slates and greywackes of the host rocks are ubiquitously sharp and intrusive. Numerous small bodies (<1–2 km^{2} (0.39–0.77 sq mi)) of fine-grained leucomonzogranite, which constitute less than 0.1% of the total pluton, are scattered throughout it. The plutons of the South Mountain Batholith are estimated to have been emplaced at depths of 6–10 kilometers (3.7–6.2 mi).

The South Mountain Batholith was emplaced in the Late Devonian time, about 370 Ma. It intruded into Cambro-Ordovician metasedimentary rocks of the Meguma Supergroup and the overlying Siluro-Devonian metasedimentary to metavolcanic rocks of the Rockville Notch Group. The South Mountain Batholith and its host rocks are overlain by coarse clastic terrestrial sedimentary rocks of the Horton Group of Late Devonian to early Mississippian age, indicating a minimum exhumation age of about 355 Ma. These stratigraphic constraints are substantiated by radiometric dating that has yielded an age range of 372–361 Ma for the age of the plutons comprising the South Mountain Batholith

== Morphology ==
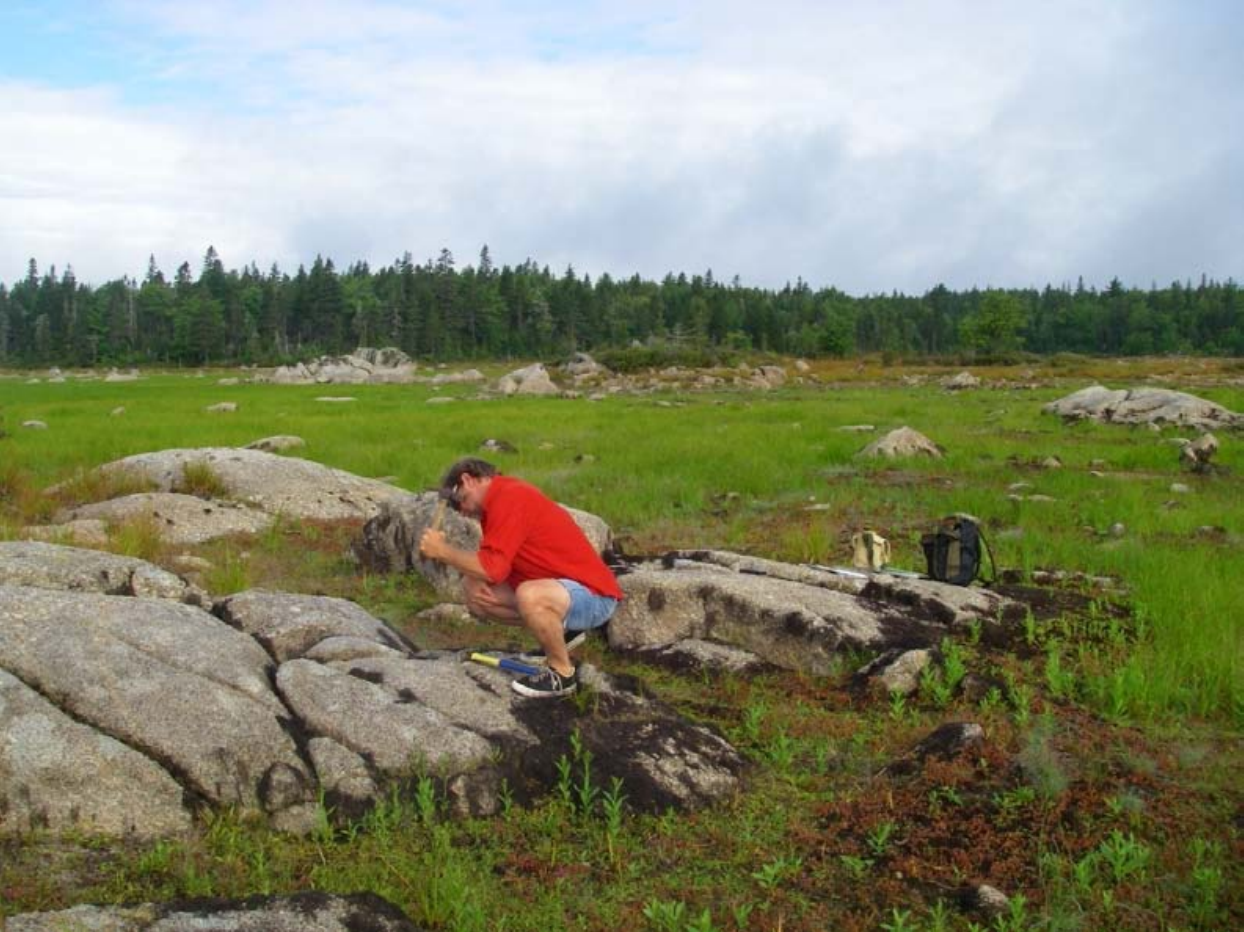
Acadia University technician Don Osburn sampling rocks near the rim of the crater for evidence of impact shock features.

The Bloody Creek structure is slightly elliptical in shape with a 420 meters (1,380 ft) long northwest-trending major axis and a 350 meters (1,150 ft) long southwest-trending minor axis. As seen in aerial photographs taken before Bloody Creek was flooded, the crater of this structure is defined by a continuous and prominent scarp that is 1 to 2 meters (3.3 to 6.6 ft) high and completely encircles what was once a flat fen. Approximately 10 meters (33 ft) of peat and lake sediments underlies the surface of the former fen. These sediments rest on a bedrock surface of irregular relief that is bisected by a southwest-trending ridge.

As interpreted from ground penetrating radar profiles, the bedrock underlying the sediments that occupy the crater of the Bloody Creek structure consists of a heterogeneous infill that differs from the bedrock outside of it. In ground penetrating radar profiles, the heterogeneous infill exhibits multiple reflections that are absent in the ground penetrating radar profiles of country rocks that lie outside of and surround this structure. The infilling material is internally faulted as shown by lateral discontinuities seen in the ground penetrating radar profiles.

Relative to similar size impact craters, i.e. the Aouelloul crater, the Bloody Creek structure has a distinctive and quite different morphology. For example, the depth of the crater of the Bloody Creek structure is quite, even anomalously, shallow although similar in diameter to the Aouelloul crater, which is 390 meters (1,280 ft) in diameter. In case of the Bloody Creek structure, the total relief of its crater from crest of its rim to base of its buried floor is only 11 to 12 meters (36 to 39 ft). In contrast, gravity and modeling studies indicate that the total relief of the Aouelloul crater from the crest of its rim to base of its buried crater floor is about 53 meters (174 ft). The Bloody Creek structure is also morphologically distinct from other similar size craters, including the Aouelloul crater, as it has an elliptical "rim" with a length to width ratio of 1.2.

== Shock metamorphism ==
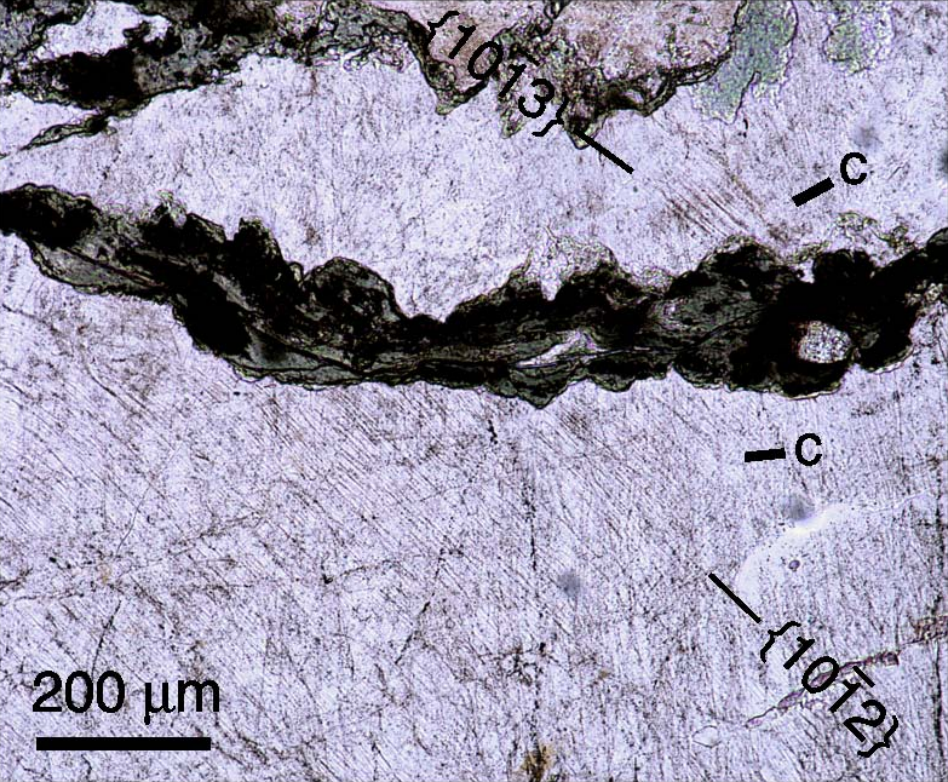
A photomicrograph of the granitic rock near the crater. The parallel lines throughout the thin section are diagnostic of shock metamorphism

Petrographic analysis using thin sections of samples collected proximal to the geomorphic rim of the Bloody Creek structure provide abundance evidence of shock metamorphism that is indicative of a hypervelocity impact associated with this structure. This evidence includes microbrecciation and cataclasis, kink-banding and rare planar microstructures in feldspar, reduced mineral birefringence, common mosaicism and planar microstructures in quartz, kink-banding in mica, and systematic degradation of biotite to chlorite showing plastic deformation and flow microtextures. The planar microstructures consist of rare planar fractures and possible planar deformation features. Of these features, the planar deformation features, known as shocked quartz, are considered uniquely diagnostic of shock metamorphism that was the result of an extraterrestrial impact.

The types of shocked quartz found in surface samples from the rim of the Bloody Creek structure indicate anomalously high formation pressures. Based on shock recovery experiments, the threshold pressure for the types of shocked quartz found in these samples is estimated to be 16 GPa, with a mean pressure of 23 GPa. These pressure estimates greatly exceed the estimated pressures for the formation of shocked quartz found in the rims of similar size and types of craters. They are only comparable in magnitude with pressures estimated for in situ target rocks at the base of such impact craters. Based upon the simple, 2.9 kilometers (1.8 mi) in diameter Brent crater in Ontario, Canada, as a model, to have the types of shocked quartz exposed at the surface at the rim of the Bloody Creek structure would theoretically require removal of at least the upper half of the original final crater. That an oblique impact, as an elliptical structure would indicate, would lessen, not increase, the pressures to which rim strata would be subjected makes the estimated formation pressures for the shocked quartz found in the rim of the Bloody Creek structure even more anomalously high.

== Origin ==
The morphology, internal structure, and abundant evidence of shock metamorphism clearly indicate that the Bloody Creek structure is likely either an impact crater or a structure that is the result of an extraterrestrial hypervelocity impact. The elliptical morphology of it strongly indicates that it is likely the result of an oblique impact.

== Age ==
The age of the Bloody Creek structure remains unanswered. In one case, the Bloody Creek structure might be a deeply eroded impact structure. This structure being relatively old and heavily eroded, presumably in part by Pleistocene glaciers, would explain both the anomalously low depth to diameter ratio of the crater structure and the anomalously high threshold pressures indicated by shocked quartz and other alteration features of the rock comprising its current rim. In such a case, the rock exposed at the surface would be the eroded base of a much larger original structure. This hypothesis is consistent with the extremely shallow depth-diameter ratio of the structure. In such a case, the sample sites would have initially been close to the bottom of the original crater and have experienced the high shock pressures indicated by the types of shocked quartz found in them. In addition, this hypothesis might also explain the lack of an obvious breccia lens that can be seen on the ground-penetrating radar profiles from inside the crater.

Alternatively, the Bloody Creek structure might be a well-preserved, uneroded, and relatively young impact crater. The anomalous morphometry of such an impact crater might be explained by an impact onto glacial ice, which may have resulted in the dissipation of much of the impact energy into the ice, resulting in the low depth to diameter ratio of the crater. This hypothesis might also explain similarities in the rate of accumulation of peat within the Bloody Creek structure and within nearby bogs with well-constrained ages that indicate this crater formed prior to deglaciation, which was about 12 thousand years ago. What is known about the stratigraphy of the peat layers from ground-penetrating radar profiles suggests that differential subsidence and compaction inside the crater may be continuing. If so, this would be another indication of a relatively young impact structure.

== The North Group ==
During the investigations of the Bloody Creek structure, a cluster of discontinuous arcuate scarps were found about 1 kilometer (0.62 mi) north of it. These arcuate scarps are known as the North Group. The analysis of aerial photography found that it consists of several discontinuous arcuate scarps that are 1 to 2 meters (3.3 to 6.6 ft) high and sharply outline depressions with relatively flat, inner floors. Sonar and lake sediment probing of a few of these structures, which are now submerged beneath Dalhousie Lake, revealed the presence of crater-like features, which underlie these floors and are inferred to be buried by lake sediment and peat. Petrographic analysis of bedrock samples collected near the eastern rim crests of the North Group identified features that are suggestive of shock metamorphism. These features include kink-bands in feldspar and biotite and planar microstructures in quartz and feldspar. The planar microstructures consist of planar fractures in both quartz and feldspar and possible planar deformation features in quartz.

== See also ==
- Charity Shoal Crater
- Clovis culture
- Corossol crater
- Quaternary extinction event
- Younger Dryas
- Younger Dryas impact hypothesis
