= Oued Seguellil =

Oued Seguellil Oued Séguélil, Oued Seguelil, Oued Seguellil وادي سكليل
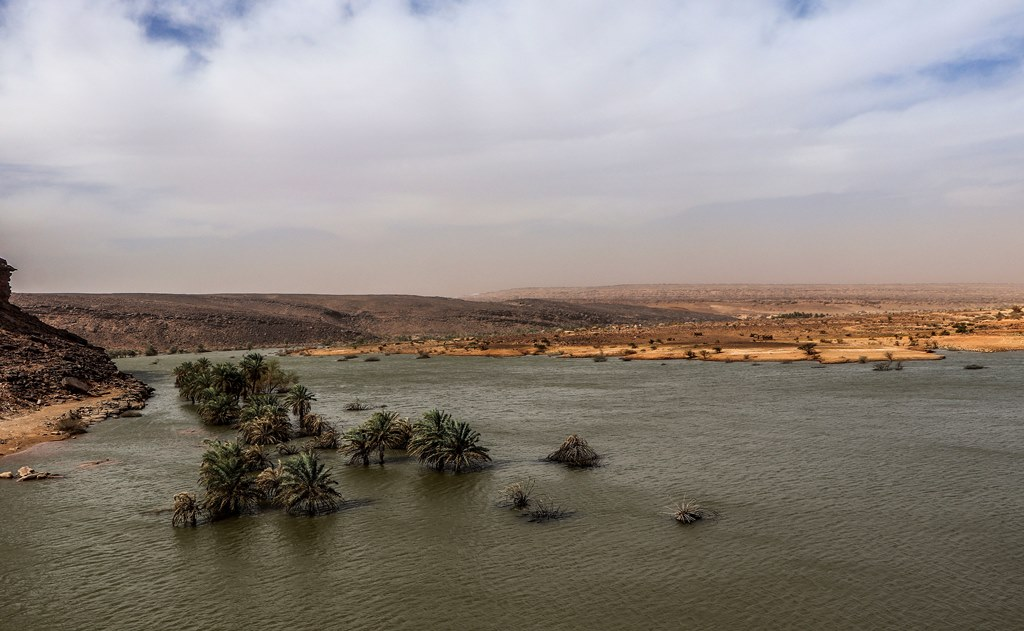
- Course of Oued Seguellil at Seguellil dam

Location
- Country: Mauritania
- Regions: Adrar Region

Oued Seguellil (or Oued Séguélil or Oued Seguelil or Oued Seguellîl) (Arabic: وادي سكليل) is a wadi in Mauritania. It begins in the Adrar Plateau and runs south-west passing through the town of Atar and getting lost in the surrounding sands.

The wadi is located along the ancient course of the Tamanrasset Paleoriver. The Adrar Plateau near Atar is rich in gorges like the oued el Abiod. Most of these gorges empty into the Seguellil wadi bed resulting in a string of pools and intermittent streams. 20 km south of Atar is the controversial Seguellil-dam, inaugurated in 2019. The river gets lost in the sands north of the western foothills of the Adrar Plateau.
