= Corossol crater =

Corossol structure
- Corossol crater
- Location within Quebec
- Location: Gulf of Saint Lawrence, Côte-Nord, Quebec, Sept-Îles, Québec, Canada; 50°03′00″N 66°23′00″W

Impact crater structure
- Confidence: Possible
- Diameter: 4.1 kilometres (3 mi)
- Age: Between post-Middle Ordovician and pre-Quaternary
- Exposed: Yes, seabottom at water depths from 40–208 metres (131–682 ft)
- Drilled: No

The Corossol structure, which is also known as the Corossol crater, is a circular, 4.3-by-3.9-kilometre (2.7 by 2.4 mi) in diameter, underwater bedrock feature that is exposed on the gulf floor of the northwestern Gulf of Saint Lawrence 20-kilometre (12 mi) offshore of the city of Sept-Îles, Quebec, in eastern Canada. It is hypothesized to be a possible pre-Pleistocene, extraterrestrial impact structure. It lies underwater at a depth of 40–208-metre (131–682 ft). This underwater feature was found during the study of high-resolution bathymetric and sub-bottom profiler data collected south of the city of Sept-Iles in the northwestern Gulf of Saint Lawrence.

== Geology ==
The Corossol structure has a maximum diameter of 4.3-kilometre (2.7 mi) and rises 25-metre (82 ft) above the surrounding sea floor. At its centre, there is central uplift is 0.9–1-kilometre (0.56–0.62 mi) in diameter and rises to the same elevation as the crater rim to a depth of about 755-metre (2,477 ft) below the surface of the Gulf of St Lawrence. This uplift lies within a 2–2.4-kilometre (1.2–1.5 mi) in diameter and 185-metre (607 ft) deep circular central cavity. The central cavity is surrounded by a 90–1,300-metre (300–4,270 ft) wide brim. In addition, three concentric rings form narrow (290-metre (950 ft) wide), shallow, and discontinuous depressions around the central cavity.

The central uplift, associated central cavity, brim, and rings likely represent both deformation and differential erosion of sedimentary rocks of the Ordovician Saint. Lawrence Platform. The sedimentary strata surrounding the Corossol structure show no deformation. However, seismic data reveal that they are highly fractured by a series of 10–15-metre (33–49 ft) deep faults. These faults also are associated with the concentric rings and form the irregular topography of the structure's brim.

Less than 50-metre (160 ft) of Quaternary sediments partially fill the central cavity. These sediments consist of glaciomarine and postglacial sediments. The central cavity and its sediment fill are interrupted by two diagonal 50-metre (160 ft) high bedrock ridges that connect the brim to the central peak. Using high-resolution seismic, it was found that the bedrock is locally covered with a thin veneer of glacial till overlain by 5–10-metre (16–33 ft) of glaciomarine and postglacial sediments. The discontinuous nature of the rings results from either partial burial of the rings under these sediments or partial erosion of the rings.

== Geomorphology ==
The gulf bottom surrounding the Corossol structure is characterized by a relict cuesta landscape consisting of partially eroded, gently inclined sedimentary rock layers that decreases southwards into a flat topography. The cuestas consist of steep northward-facing scarps and gentle southward-dipping slopes. Along its north side, the crater is truncated by a steep scarp of one of these cuestas and a 600-metre (2,000 ft) wide and 248-metre (814 ft) deep basin. Distinct 200–500-metre (660–1,640 ft) long and 75–100-metre (246–328 ft) wide streamlined glacial lineations cut across the southern half of the Corossol structure. The cuestas and associated paleovalleys likely were created by fluvial erosion during regional sea-level lowstand(s) that likely predates Quaternary glaciations. The passage of the Laurentide Ice Sheet formed the streamlined glacial lineations that cut across the southern half of the Corossol structure. The orientation of these lineations indicate SE–SSE-directed ice flow that scoured the surface of the Corossol structure.

== Origin ==
It is proposed that the Corossol structure was created as a result of the impact of a meteorite of about 300 metres (980 ft) in diameter. The impact origin of the Corossol structure is indicated by its associated geology, faulting, fracturing, and a rock fragment recovered from the crater surface. This rock fragment exhibits, under the microscope, impact melt and shock-induced structures.

== Age ==
The precise, absolute age of the Corossol structure remains undetermined. It geological setting and cross-cutting relationships indicate that it was created long after the Middle Ordovician (470 million years ago) and before the accumulation of glacial till and creation of streamlined lineations, which are interpreted as subglacially produced mega-scale glacial lineations, on its surface. The relict cuestas and evidence of fluvial erosion observed on the outer walls of the structure, imply it was formed during one of the periods of regional lowstand of sea level prior to the Quaternary glaciations.

== See also ==
- Bloody Creek crater
- Charity Shoal crater
