= Charity Shoal crater =

Submerged crater in Ontario, Canada

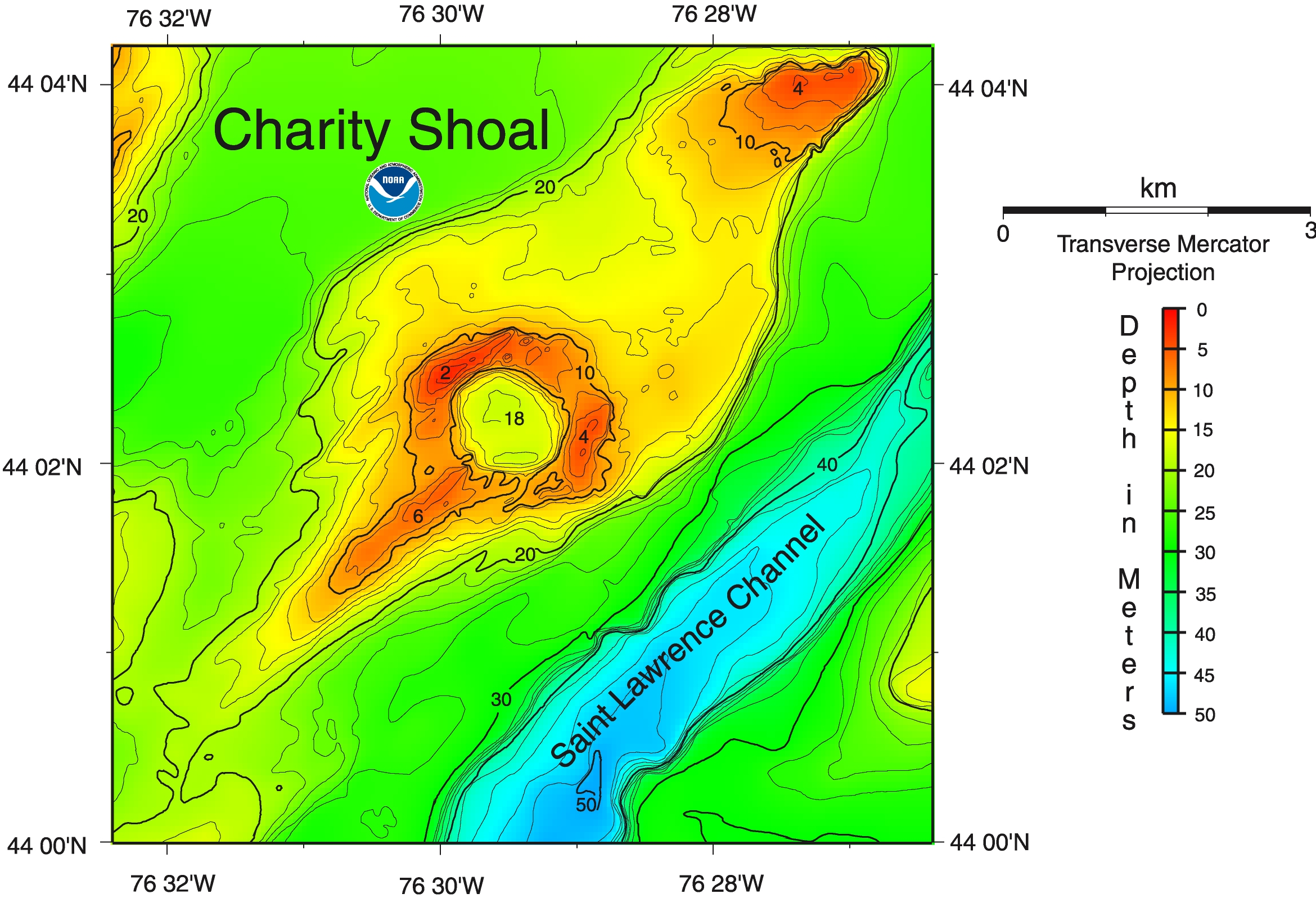

- Location within Ontario
- Location: Lake Ontario, Ontario, Canada; 44°2′15″N 76°29′37″W

Impact crater structure
- Confidence: Possible
- Diameter: 1.2–1.4 kilometers (0.75–0.87 mi)
- Age: Middle Ordovician
- Exposed: Yes, on lake bottom, but covered with thin veneer of Ordovician limestone at water depths from 1–19.5 meters (3.3–64.0 ft)
- Drilled: No

The Charity Shoal crater is a 1.2–1.4 kilometers (0.75–0.87 mi) in diameter circular feature that lies submerged beneath the northeast end of Lake Ontario about 12 kilometers (7.5 mi) southwest of Wolfe Island, and 25 kilometers (16 mi) south of Kingston, Ontario, at about latitude 44° 02′ N and longitude 76° 29′ W. It is hypothesized to be a Middle Ordovician impact crater from about 460 million years ago.

== History ==
On December 5, 1897, the steamship Rosedale grounded upon the rocks of East Charity Shoal in the eastern end of Lake Ontario during a northwest gale. During the summer of 1900, John C. Churchill, Jr. visited Charity Shoal to survey and chart the outlying spur known as East Charity Shoal.

It was first mapped in detail as part of a bathymetric map of Lake Ontario that was compiled from historic data sets by the National Oceanic and Atmospheric Administration's (NOAA) National Geophysical Data Center, the NOAA Great Lakes Environmental Research Laboratory, and the Canadian Hydrographic Service. Based on this bathymetric map and field investigations, it was first proposed in 2001 that Charity Creek Crater is an impact crater. In November 2010 and May 2011, high-resolution bathymetric and acoustic backscatter data were collected from the area of Charity Shoal and a 1 by 1 m grid model of its bathymetry was assembled by the Canadian Hydrographic Service. In July 2012, detailed magnetic and bathymetric surveys were conducted across a 9 km^{2} (3.5 sq mi) area over Charity Shoal.

== Morphology ==
The Charity Shoal Crater is a small oval basin with a circular rim that is approximately 1.2–1.5 kilometers (0.75–0.93 mi) in diameter. A continuous rim encircles the crater floor, ranging in water depth from less than 1 m at the Charity Shoal Lighthouse on the eastern rim, to just over 10 meters (33 ft) at the southernmost juncture of the rim. The exterior slopes of its rim are less steep than its interior slopes. Northeast-southwest trending erosional valleys cut across the southwestern sector of the crater rim. The crater floor is slightly ovoid, with a northwest–southeast-oriented long axis diameter of about 1 kilometer (0.62 mi) and a short axis diameter of about 0.8 kilometers (0.50 mi). At its deepest point, this basin is 18–19.5 meters (59–64 ft). A low, 2–3 meters (6.6–9.8 ft) high, central rise high, ridge divides the interior basin into two separate, small depressions.

From the Charity Shoal Crater, a prominent, elongated, and tapering ridge extends about 3–4 kilometers (1.9–2.5 mi) southwestward away from its rim and gives it the appearance of a frying pan. At its shallowest, the ridge lies less than 6 meters (20 ft) below the surface of Lake Ontario. Northwest and southeast of and parallel to this ridge, smaller northwest–southeast-trending ridges lie at depths of 18–19.5 meters (59–64 ft). In addition, numerous smaller northeast–southwest trending linear features cut Charity Shoal Crater and cover the entire northeastern end of Lake Ontario.

The Charity Shoal Crater and associated ridge both lie upon a broader and larger flat-topped ridge. This larger ridge is one of a series of several N23E-trending ridge segments that lie between Main Duck and Wolfe Islands and just northwest of the 30–50 meters (98–164 ft) Saint Lawrence Channel. The Simcoe Island Channel lies on the opposite side of this ridge. This ridge, the Charity Shoal Crater, and the entire northeast end of Lake Ontario are all crosscut N53E-trending lineations. These lineations, which were likely created by subglacial erosion, form a well-defined en echelon topography that characterize the bottom of Lake Ontario.

== Surface geology ==
The surface of the Charity Shoal Crater consists of a mixture of bedrock, broken bedrock, and lacustrine sediments. The rim of this feature consists of eroded bedrock and patches of broken bedrock. Broken bedrock covers the interior and exterior slopes of the feature. Loose rocks recovered from the inner slope of the west–central portion of the crater rim consisted mainly of sandstone, quartzite, and gneiss that are glacial erratics derived from exposures of Precambrian, Cambrian, and Ordovician strata to the northeast. Of these rocks, two specimens consist of fossiliferous limestone and are thought to be representative of local bedrock. Neither shatter cones nor breccia were reported as having been observed among these rocks.

The interior basin of this feature is stiff, varved clay covered with a layer of about 1–2 cm (0.39–0.79 in) of coarse brown sand. Sub-bottom seismic profiles found that at most a maximum of 10–12 meters (33–39 ft) of crudely stratified unconsolidated sediments overlie Ordovician limestones of the Trenton Group. Planar parallel reflections, which are interpreted as laminated (post-glacial-Holocene?) muds and silt, comprise the upper 2–3 meters (6.6–9.8 ft) of the crater fill. These sediments overlie an acoustically transparent unit that is largely devoid of reflections. This unit represents poorly-stratified unconsolidated sediment that likely consists of sand and gravel. The base of the crater fill is a low-relief, symmetric, parabolic-shaped bedrock surface that lies only 20 meters (66 ft) below the crest of the crater's rim.

The ridge that extends southwestward from the crater consists of bedrock that is capped by unstratified gravelly and sandy sediment that resembles a medial moraine. The orientation of this ridge parallels other northwest–southeast-trending ridges, lineations, and features that cut through the rim of the Charity Shoal Crater and the bedrock bottom of Lake Ontario.

== Bedrock geology ==
The bottom of Lake Ontario within the area of the Charity Shoal Crater consists of Middle Ordovician limestone belonging to the Trenton Group. They are hard erosion-resistant strata that dip very gently to the southwest. As a result, the Trenton Group forms the lake bottom over a wide area although it is only hundreds of meters thick. These Middle Ordovician strata overlie thin Cambrian sandstones which in turn rest unconformably on Late Proterozoic basement rocks. The basement rocks are part of the Frontenac Terrane of the Grenville Province. Thus, they most likely consist of high-grade gneisses, marble and quartzite.

High-resolution multibeam sonar data collected in November 2010 and May 2011 revealed that the rim of the crater consists of undisturbed and unbrecciated bedrock that has been almost completely stripped of sediments and debris by erosion. The sonar data demonstrates that the rim consists of severely eroded bedrock exhibiting micro-ridges that are generally less than 1 meter (3.3 ft) in relief and spaced generally less than 15 meters (49 ft) apart, depending on the thicknesses, attitudes, and erosional resistances of the strata. Furthermore, these micro-ridges both parallel the rim itself, and dip away from the rim axis in both directions, revealing a continuous ring anticline with a diameter of 2.1–2.5 kilometers (1.3–1.6 mi). This ring anticline coincides with the crater rim, with rock strata dipping gently in both directions away from the rim axis. The ring anticline is more nearly circular, in contrast to the ovoid shape of the Charity Shoal topographic crater floor. The dips of exposed rock strata are generally gentle and lack any evidence of beds being overturned or even vertical.

== Evidence of shock metamorphism ==
No evidence of shock metamorphism has been reported from the Charity Shoal Crater. This is likely because in situ samples from the sedimentary strata underlying the layers Middle Ordovician limestone that still cover the rim of this feature have not been collected from it. Drilling and coring of this feature will be required to recover any evidence of shock metamorphism and verify the impact origin of the Charity Shoal Crater.

== Origin ==
The ring anticline that forms the bulk of the rim of the Charity Shoal Crater is interpreted to consist of layers of Middle Ordovician limestone that are draped over the still buried rim of an underlying crater. The microridges are argued to be edges of these limestone beds that have been truncated by erosion, which is presumed to be glacial in nature. Based upon its circular shape, lack of local and regional volcanism, and geophysical anomalies, the Charity Shoal Crater is hypothesized to be an extraterrestrial impact crater. As a result of modelling of data collected during a magnetic survey of this feature, Philip Suttak concluded that Charity Shoal Crater is neither a shallow glacial erosional, nor karst sinkhole. As modelled, the data proved to be most consistent with an impact crater that is in the range of 450–600 meters (1,480–1,970 ft) deep and possibly consistent with a diatreme.

The ridge that extends southwestward from the crater is judged to represent a till ridge or bedrock fluting (crag-and-tail feature). Crag-and-tail features are a common occurrence in some drumlin fields. It likely formed below the southwestward-flowing Laurentide Ice Sheet during the last glaciation. Other streamlined erosional features, e.g., oriented bedrock ridges and troughs, flat-topped ridges, and bedrock lineations, indicate that the bottom of this part of Lake Ontario, including Charity Shoal, has been significantly modified by glacial erosion.

== Age ==
Currently, the age of the Charity Shoal Crater is argued to be from the Middle Ordovician period, about 460 million years ago. The presence of continuous and well-defined northeast-trending lineations that cut across both the Charity Shoal Crater and adjacent bedrock indicates that this landform has been significantly eroded by glacial processes and predates the last glacial advance of the Laurentide Ice Sheet. As the existing research indicates that the rim of this crater is draped by layers of Middle Ordovician limestone, the Charity Shoal Crater must be at least as old as the Middle Ordovician. That its rim height is 80 to 90 percent lower than predicted by cratering models indicates that the relief has been diminished by the filling of the central basin with sediments after its formation.

== See also ==
- Bloody Creek crater
- Corossol crater
- Ordovician
