= Tifoujar Pass =

Mountain pass

TifoujarPass
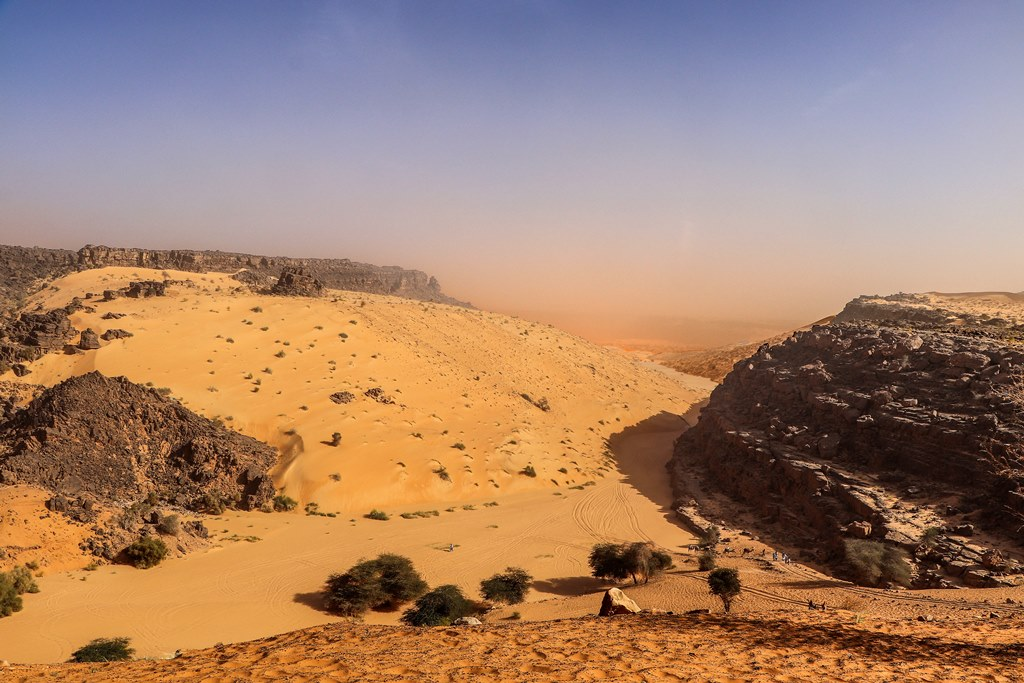
- Tifoujar pass. View from above

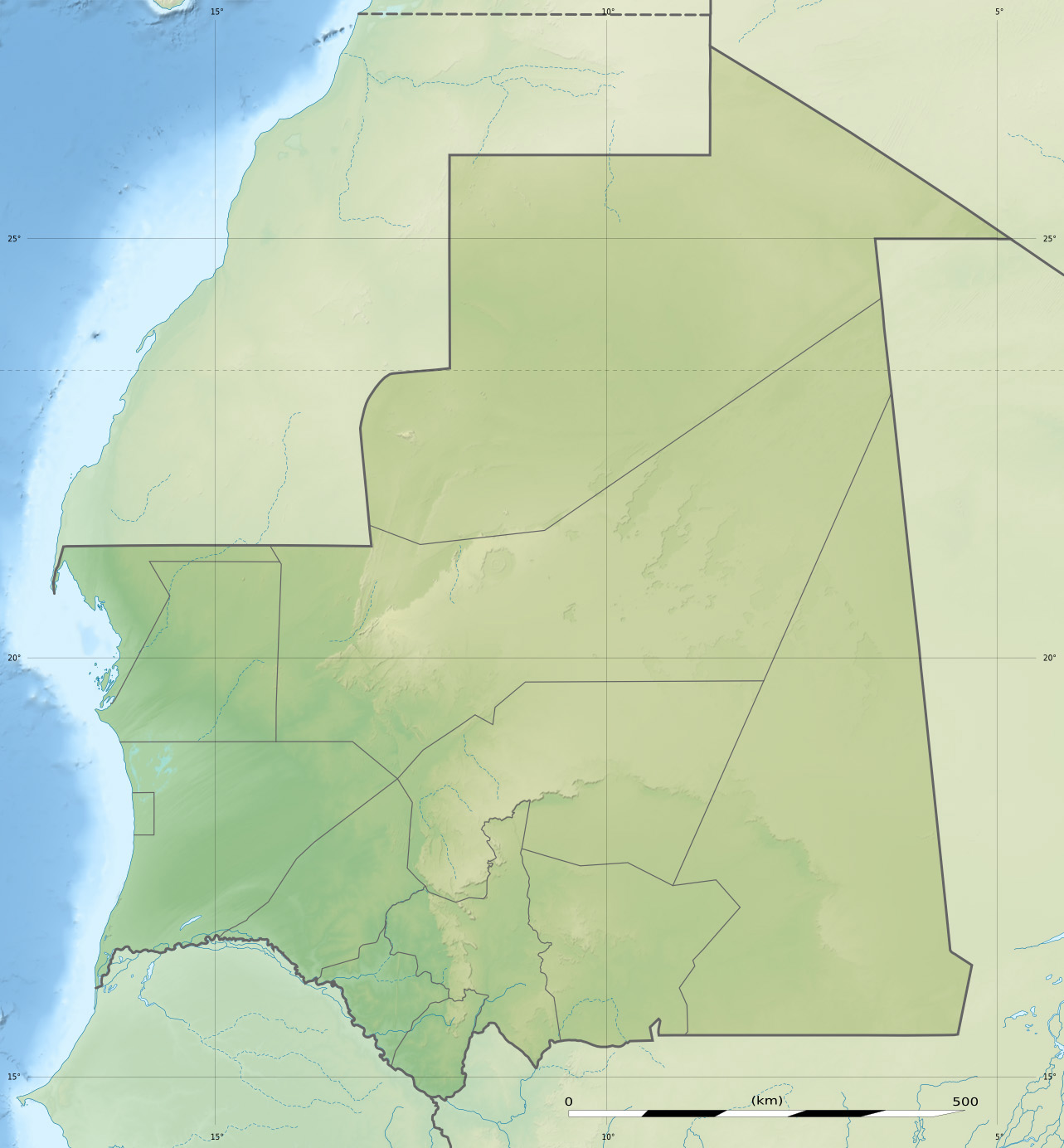
- Location within Mauritania
- Elevation: 278 metres (912 ft)
- Traversed by: Sand track

Third Approach
- Location: Mauritania
- Range: Adrar Plateau
- Coordinates: 20°5′58.81″N 13°11′48.19″W

Tifoujar Pass is a mountain pass in Mauritania. It is located in the Adrar Plateau, 400 km northeast of the capital Nouakchott. The pass, completely sandy, dominates an eponymous gorge which ends in the Oued el Abiod or White Valley on the eastern side and originates the erg Amatlich on its western slopes.

The area has hot desert climate in the Köppen climate classification. The annual average temperature is 30 °C. The warmest month is May with average temperatures of 35 °C, and the coldest is January, with 22 °C. The average annual rainfall is 108 mm. The most humid month is September, with 46 mm of rainfall, and the driest is January, with 1 mm of rainfall.
