= Agrour Amogjar =

Mountain peak in Mauritania

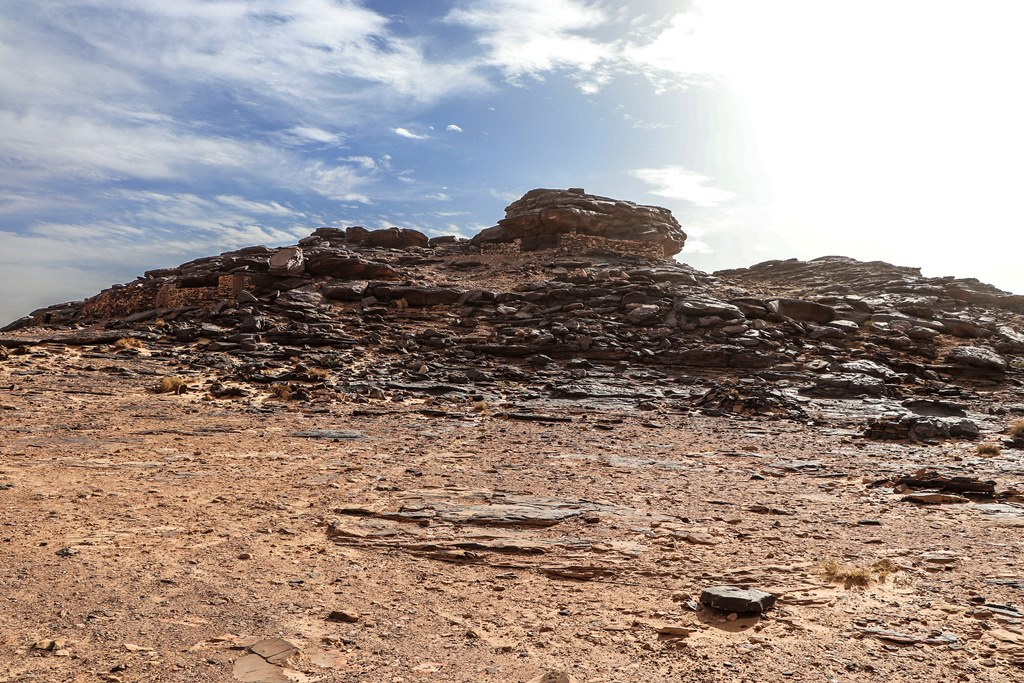
- The peak of Agrour Amogjar

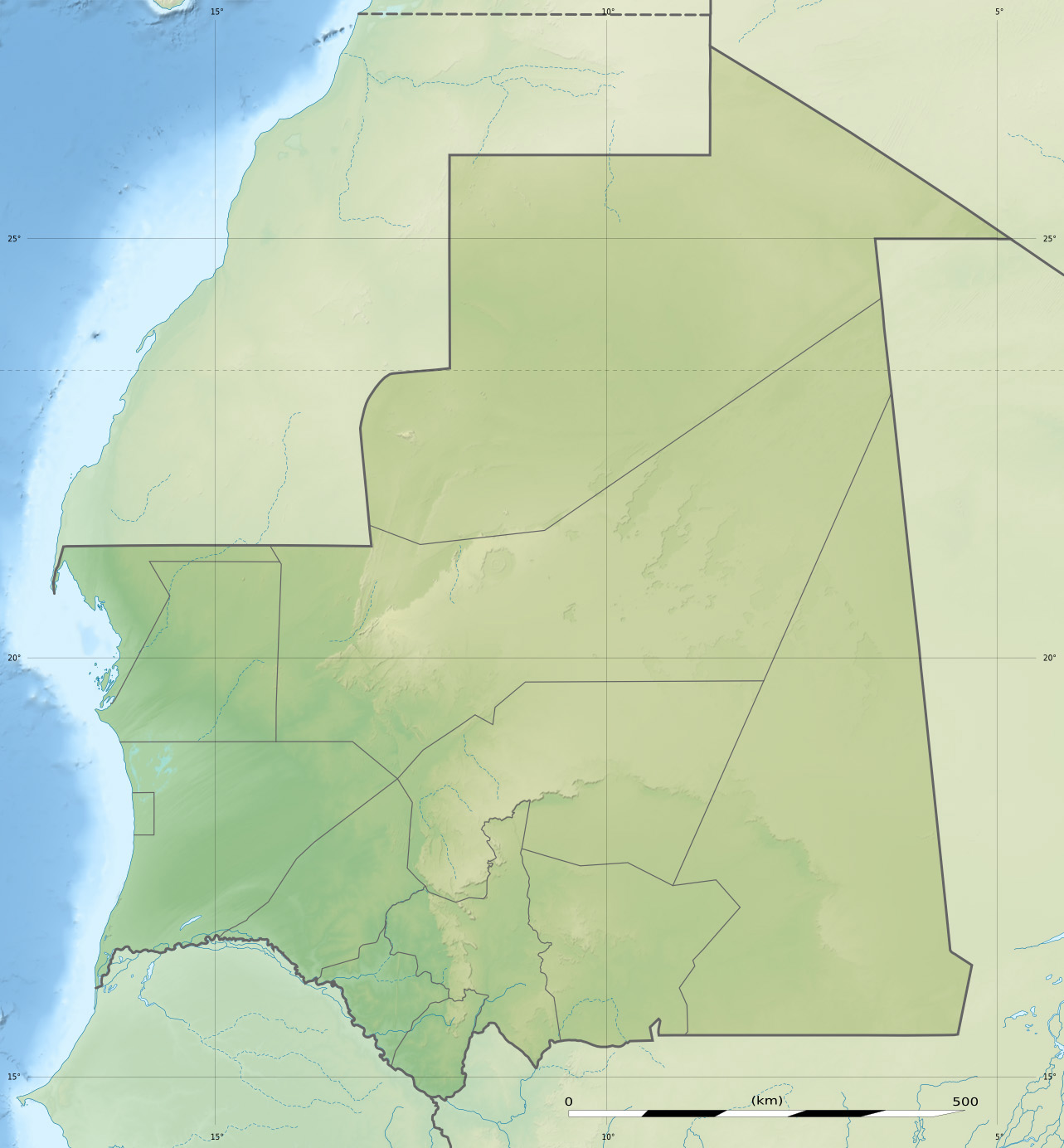
- Location within Mauritania
- 20°38′1″N 12°43′27″W
- Periods: Neolithic
- Location: Adrar plateau
- Region: Adrar, Mauritania

The Agrour Amogjar is a 690 m high peak near the Amogjar Pass, in the Adrar plateau of central Mauritania. Its small natural shelters house a rich collection of rock paintings in a damaged state. An enclosure protects some of the shelters and access is subject to a fee.

== Rock paintings ==
The set of rock paintings is heterogeneous. Eight stylistic groups have been recorded, ranging from the "pastoral" period to the most recent graffiti. The panels are featuring geometric circles with sunburst design, handprints, naturalistic wildlife such as giraffe, lion and crocodile, as well as herds of cattle and human collective scenes. The most important set is a frieze of dancers.

== Gallery ==
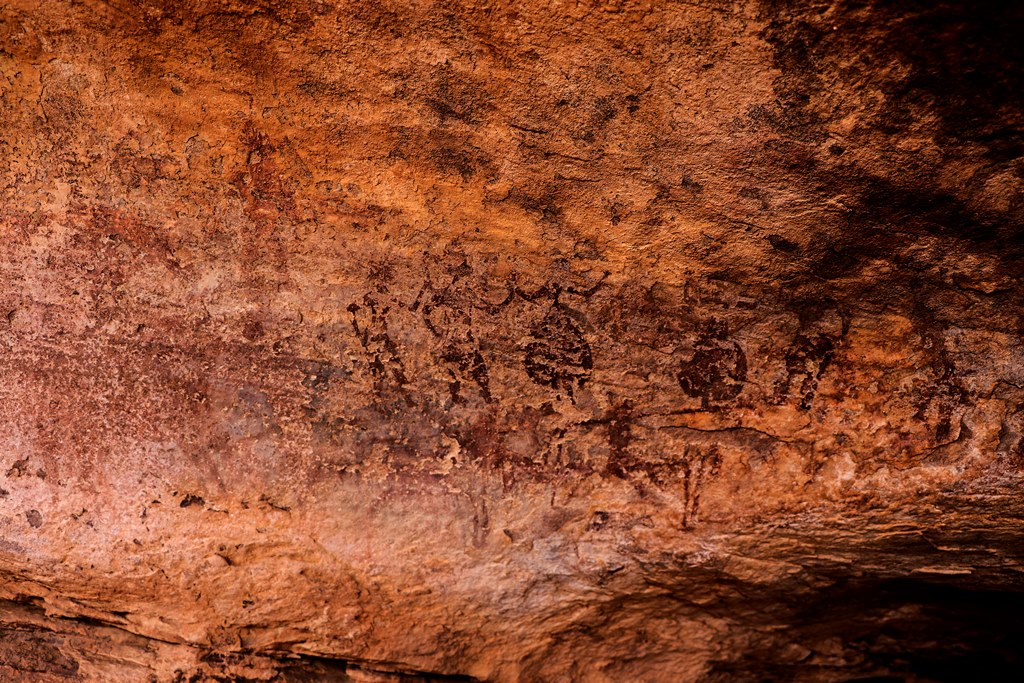
Frieze of dancers

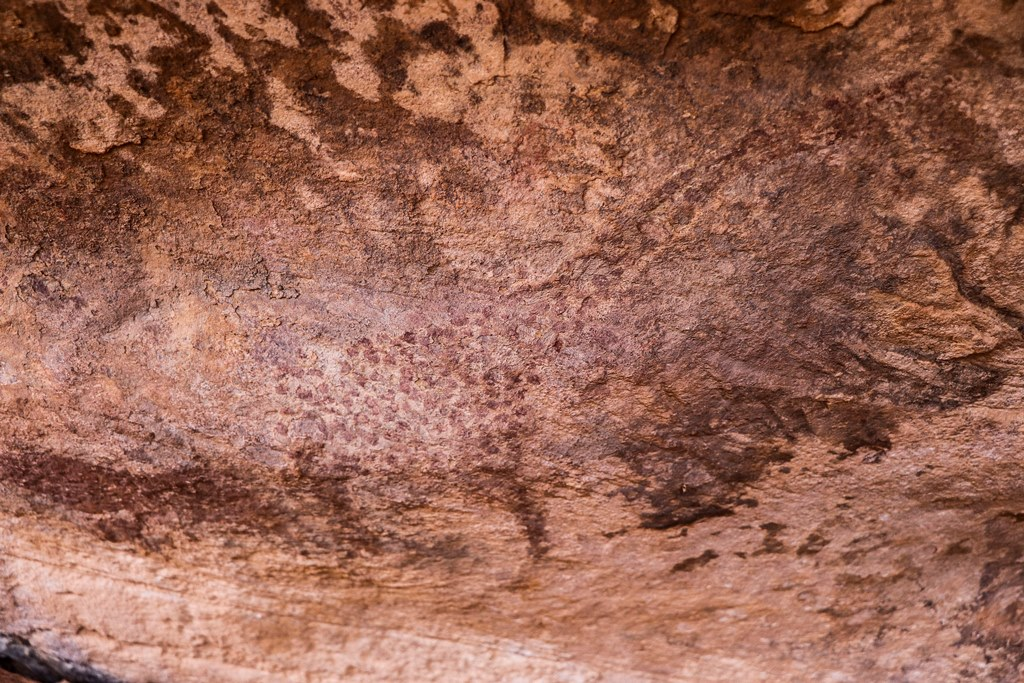
Pecked giraffe

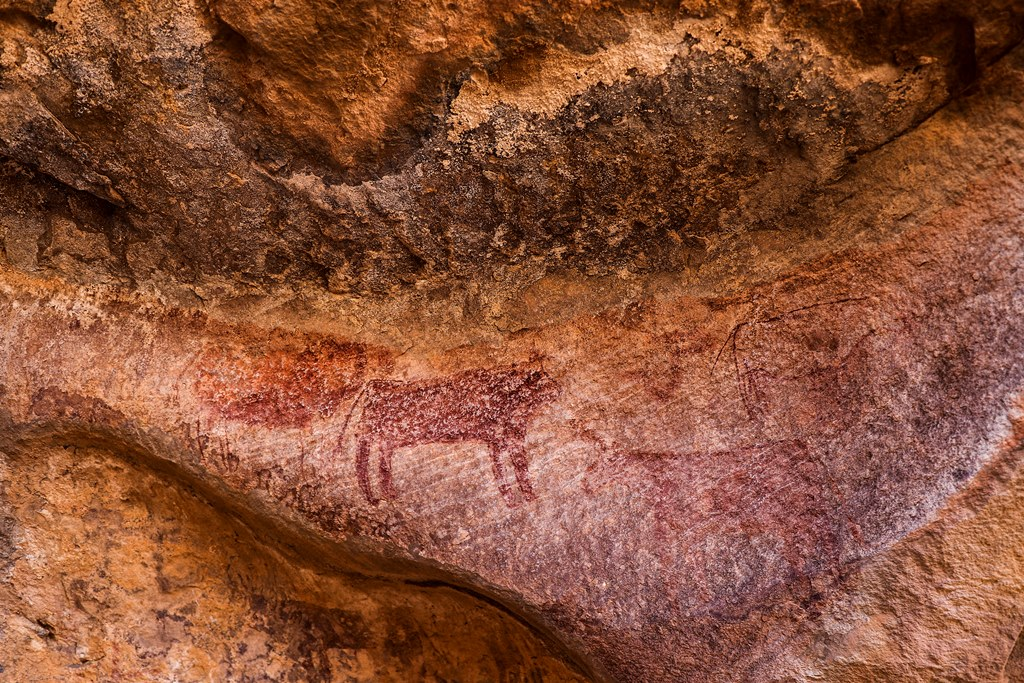
Cattle

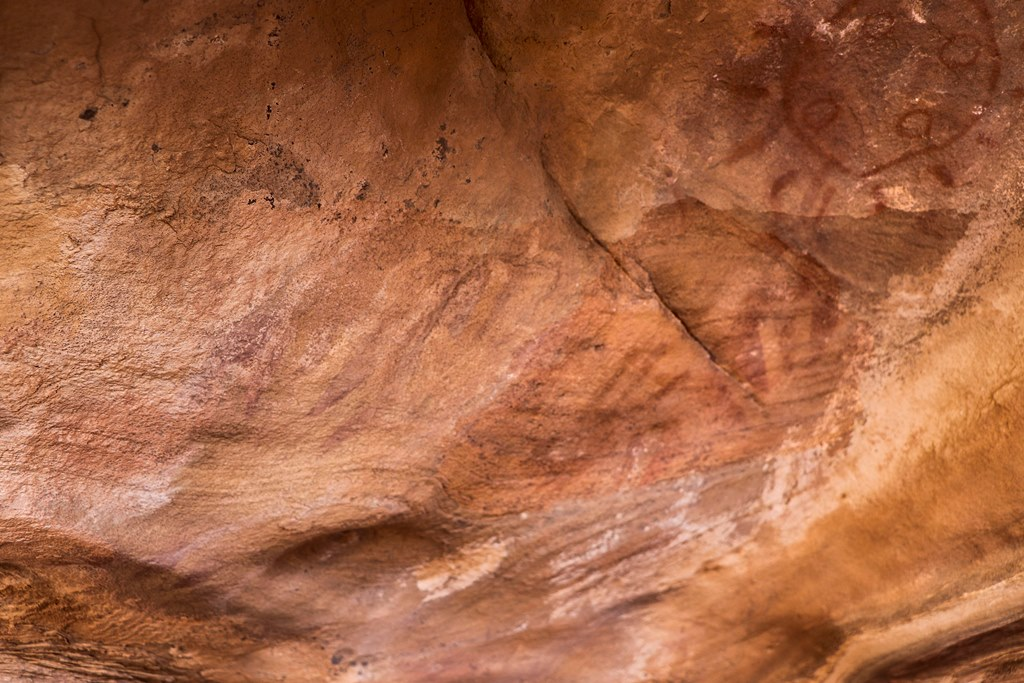
Geometric circle in red, with rays, and handprints

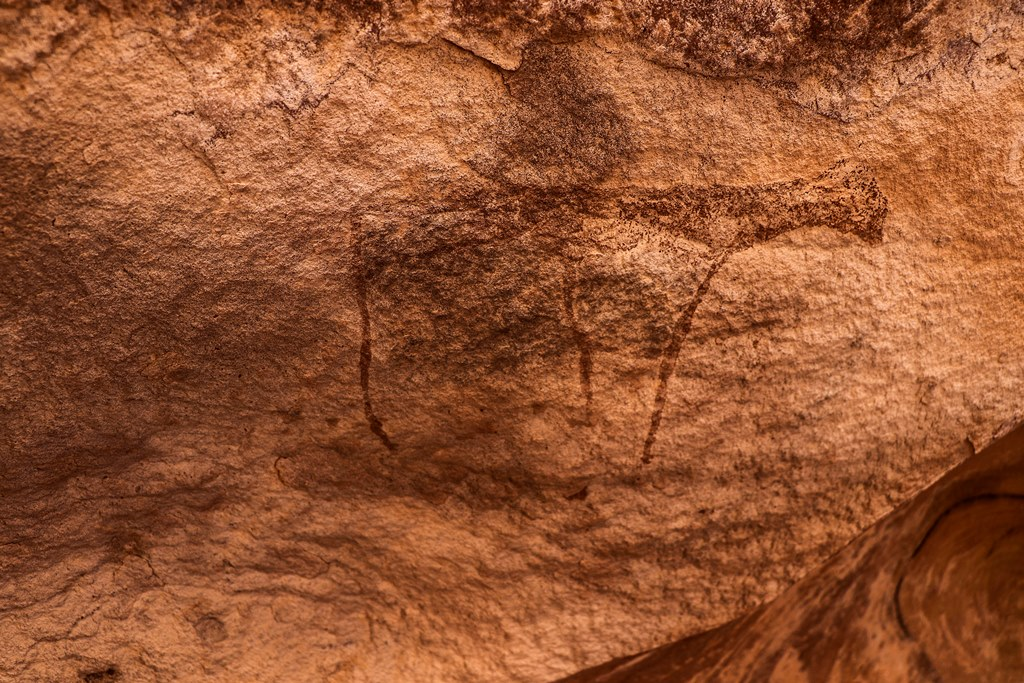
Schematically drawn bovine
