= Amojjar Pass =

Mountain pass in the Adrar Plateau, Mauritania

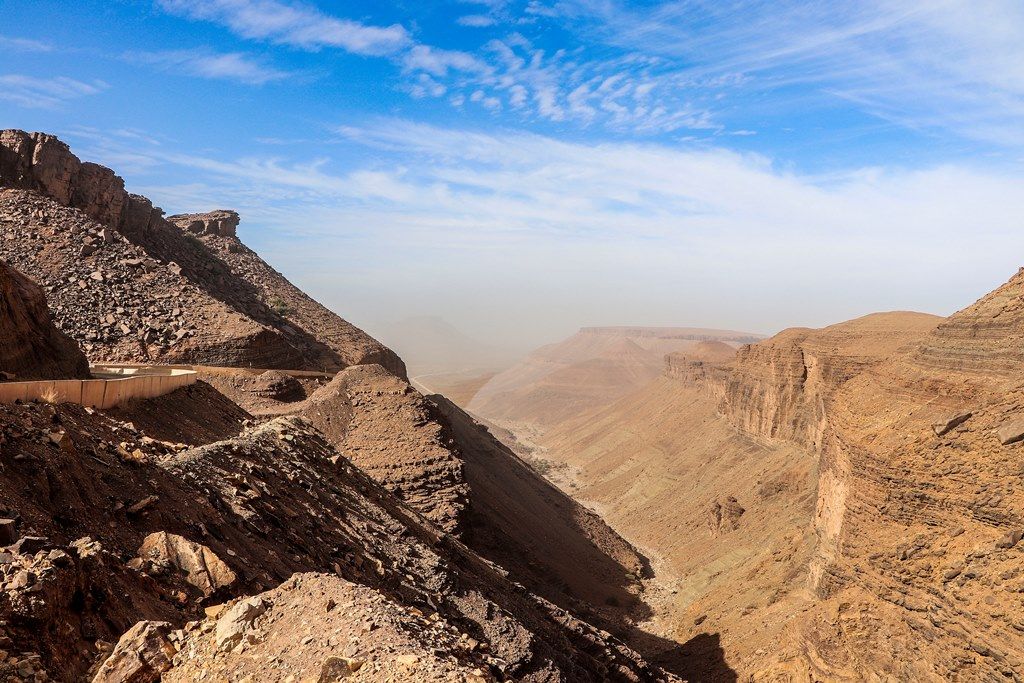
- Amojjar Pass Road
- Traversed by: Road

Third Approach
- Location: Atar, Mauritania
- Range: Adrar Plateau

Amojjar Pass is a mountain pass in the Adrar Plateau in the centre of Adrar, near Atar, Mauritania. The pink-brown sandstone of the pass was worn away by repeated cycles of extreme dryness interrupted by torrential rain. The bases of the steep valley walls are covered in scree, loosened by the erosion of the rainfall. There is little plant life in the pass. Acacias are a notable exception, as they are resistant to drought.

Amojjar Pass is an important link for ground transportation in Mauritania because it provides a somewhat protected roadway connecting Mauritania's capital, Nouakchott, with other important locations such as Ouadane and Chinguetti.

The Neolithic rock paintings of Agrour Amogjar are near the pass, northeast of Atar at 20°35′N 12°45′W.

== Gallery ==
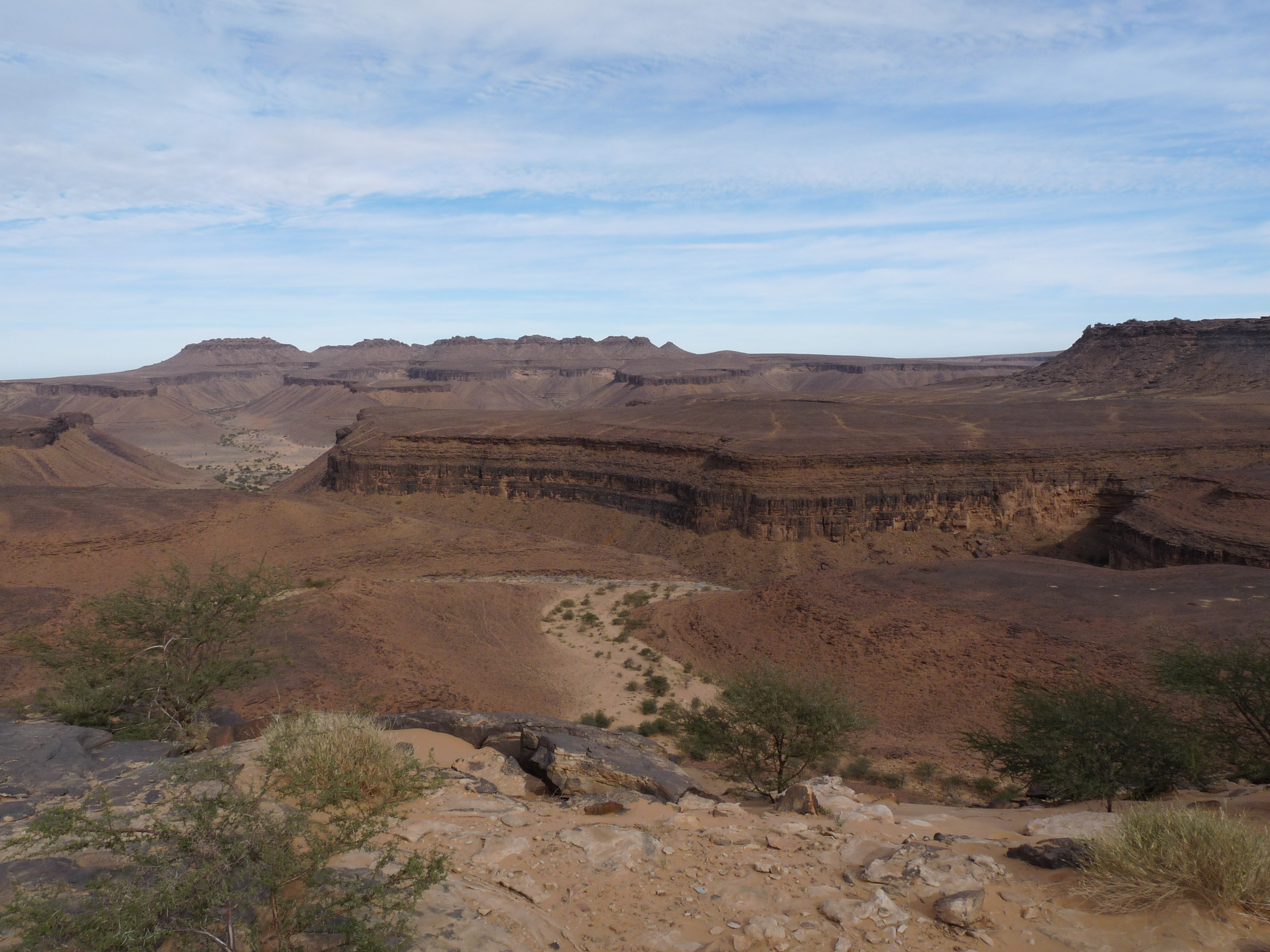
On the Amojjar Pass

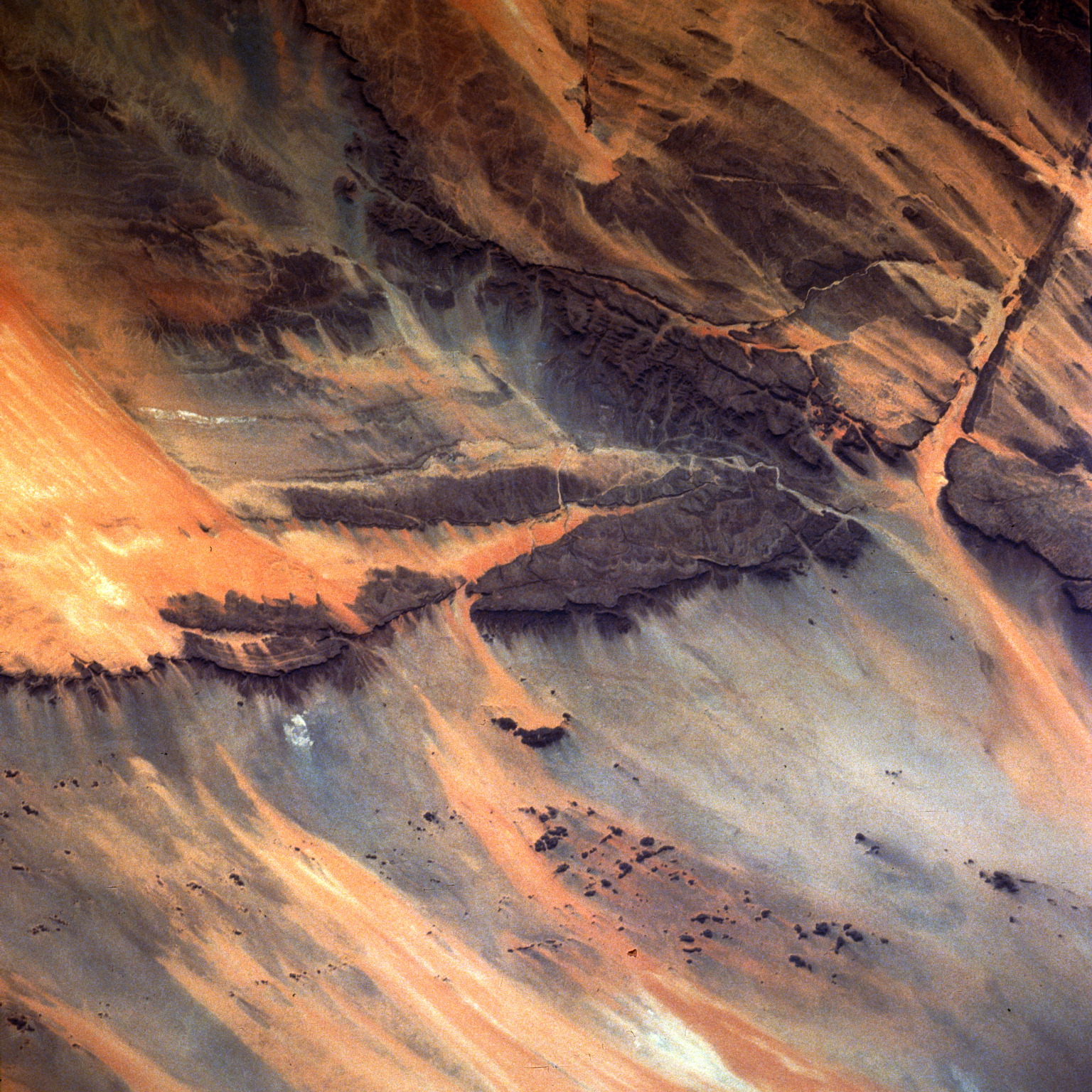
Satellite image of Amojjar Pass, in the canyon just east of the large flat-topped plateau (center) North on the left.
