= Aouelloul crater =

Impact crater in Mauritania

Coordinates: 20°14′28″N 12°40′30″W

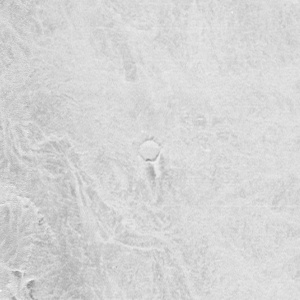
- Aouelloul crater at center
- Location: Mauritania

Impact crater structure
- Confidence: Confirmed
- Diameter: 390 metres (1,280 ft)
- Age: 3.1 ± 0.3 Ma

Aouelloul is an impact crater in Mauritania. It is located in the Akchar Desert, part of the Sahara Desert, approximately 50 kilometres (31 mi) southeast of Atar.

The crater is exposed, 390 metres (1,280 ft) wide and roughly circular. The rim rises up to 53 metres (174 ft) above the bottom of the crater. Sediments in the crater are approximately 23 metres (75 ft) thick. Its age is estimated to be 3.1 ± 0.3 million years (Pliocene).

Tektites are found around the crater, although very few meteorites have been found. The Zerga meteorite was found in 1973 immediately outside the crater rim to the south southeast, but scientists are unsure if it is the same meteorite (or even a part of it) that formed the crater.
