= Adrar Plateau =

Coordinates: 20.5°N 11.0°W

Adrar هضبة آدرار
- Natural region
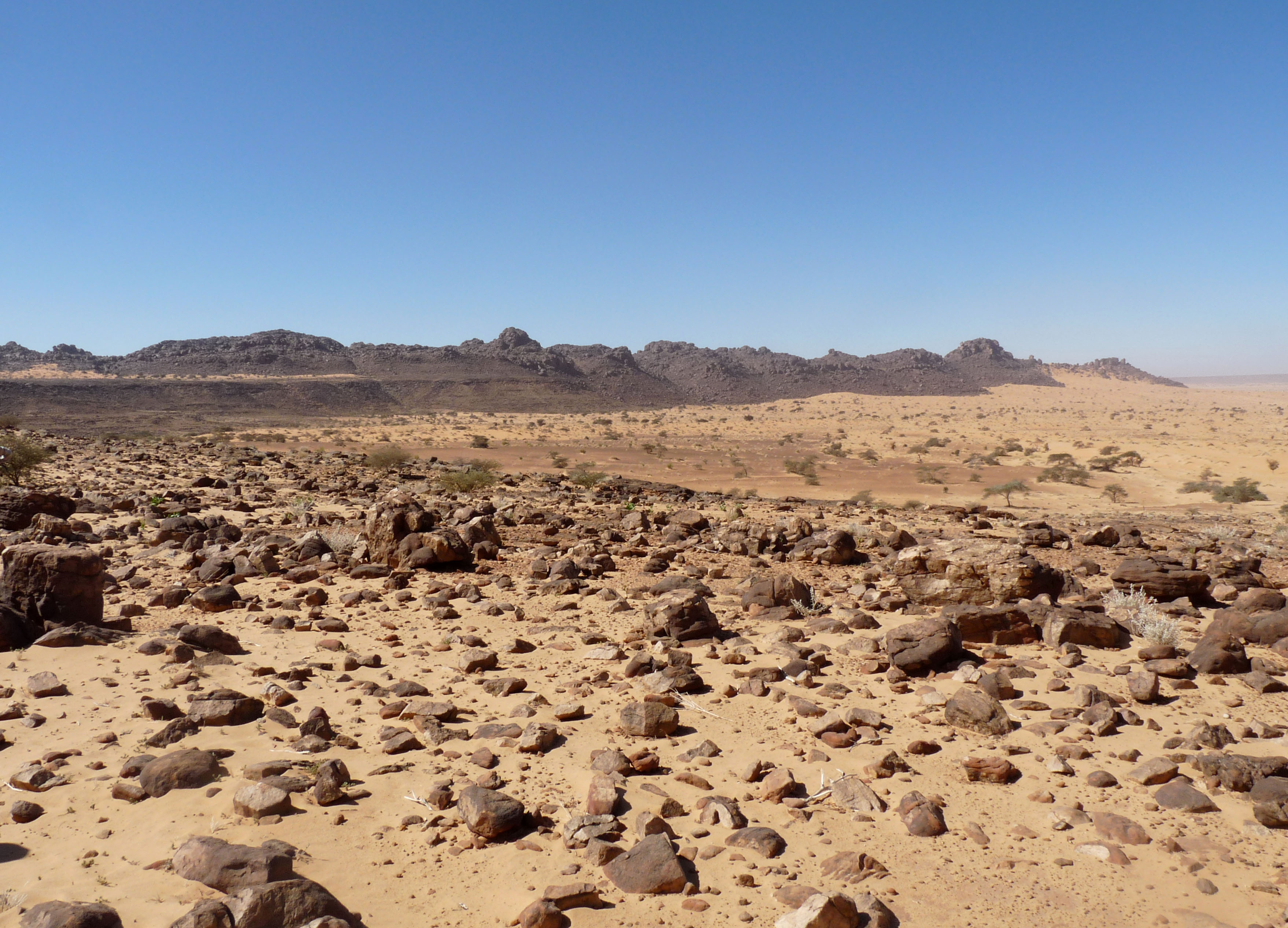
- Landscape of the stony desert known as Reg de l'Adrar

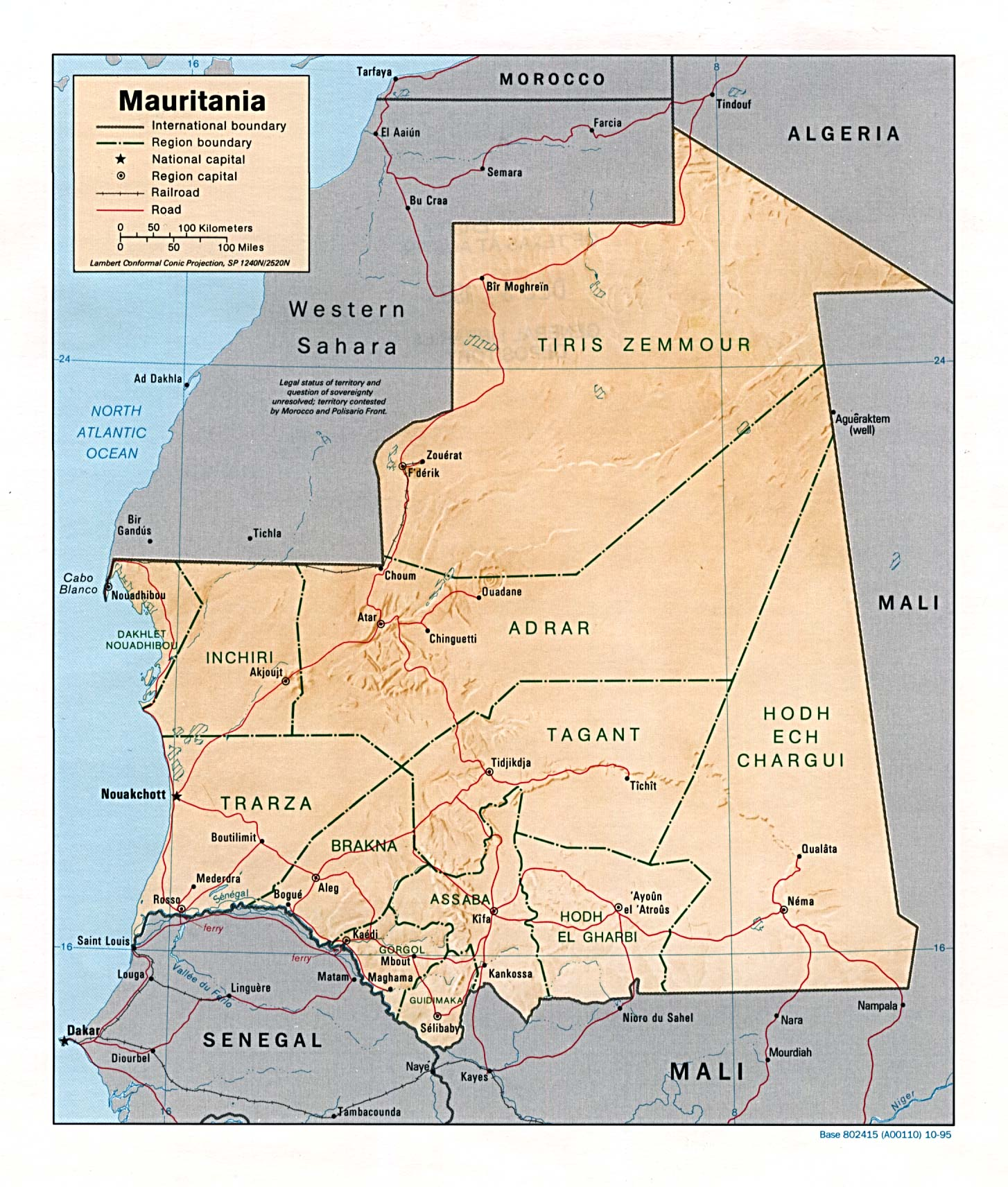
- Location of the Adrar in central Mauritania
- Country: Mauritania
- Elevation: 340 m (1,120 ft)

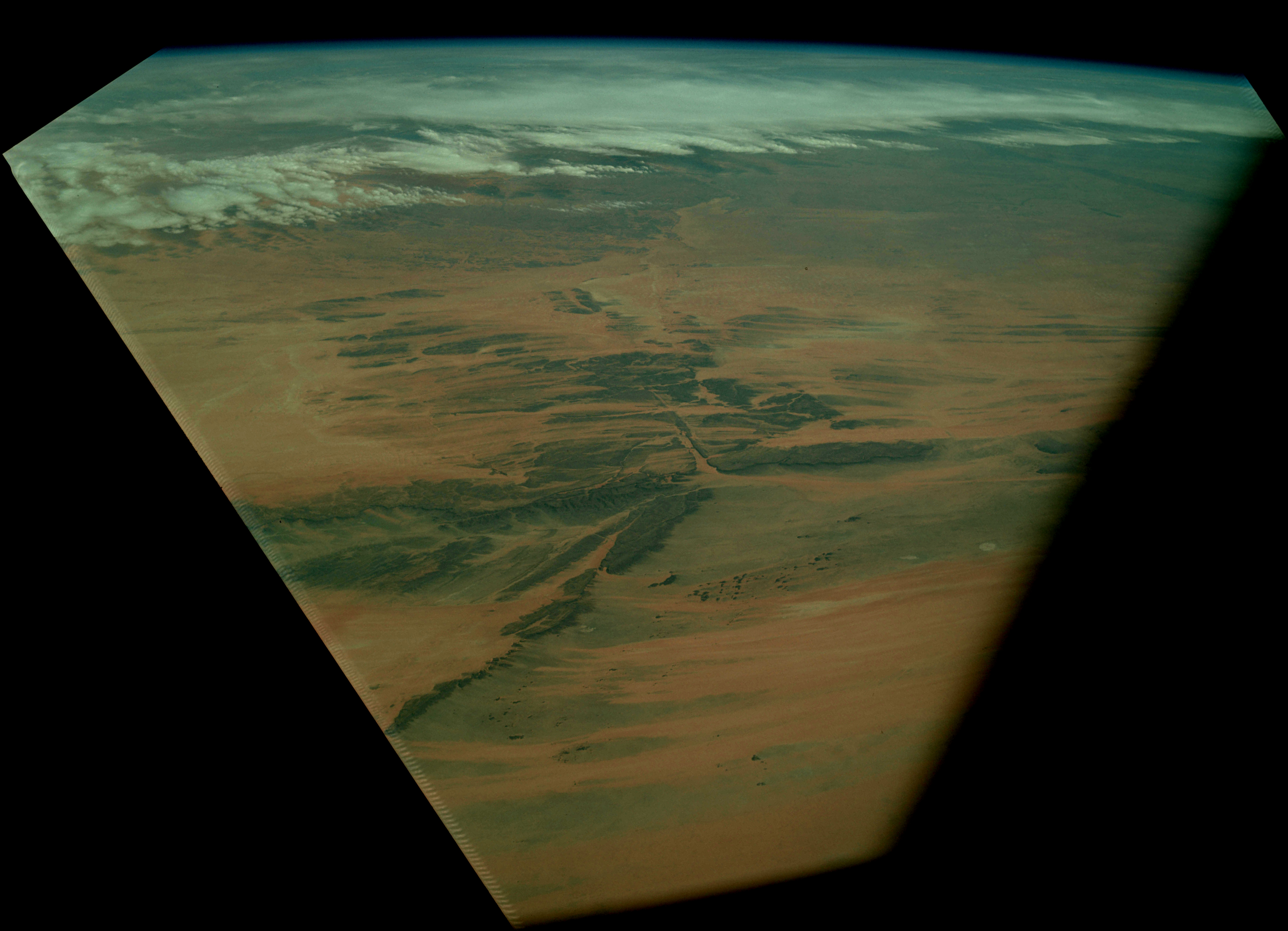
Oblique view of Adrar Plateau from Apollo 9

The Adrar (Arabic: هضبة آدرار, Berber for "mountain") is a highland natural and historical region of the Sahara Desert in northern Mauritania. The Adrar Region, an administrative division of Mauritania, is named after the traditional region. It is sometimes called Adrar Tamar to distinguish it from other areas called Adrar in the Sahara.

== Geography ==
The Adrar is an arid plateau, known for its gorges, regs (stony deserts) and sand dunes. Structurally the Adrar is a low central massif which rises to over 700 m (2,297 ft) above sea level, just east of Atar near the Amojjar Pass on the track to Chinguetti, then loses elevation and becomes subsumed by dunes to the south and east. Limited cultivation is only possible in the gorges at lower elevations such as Oued Seguellil, where the water table is high enough to support large palm groves.

Features include the Oued el Abiod or 'White Valley', a dune-filled fault line along which many small settlements and palm groves are found. The Guelb Aouelloul crater is 3.1 million-old impact crater which was studied by the noted Saharan scholar Théodore Monod. To the east beyond Ouadane is the distinctive Richat Structure, an uplifted and then heavily eroded dome of strata approximately 40 km across and whose concentric rings resemble an impact crater when observed from space.

The Adrar region is home to a small human population, centered on the town of Atar. The ancient town of Ouadane, formerly an important caravan and gold-trading center, is located towards the eastern edge of the Adrar. Chinguetti is another important historical town in the region.

== History ==
The Adrar was settled in the Neolithic era as shown by cave and rock paintings found in the area such as the Agrour Amogjar. The more recent aridification has left much of the archaeology intact, most notable several stone circles, e.g. Atar Stone Circle, and the later town of Azougui.

Beginning in the mid-17th century, migrants from the Adrar Plateau region moved into the Tagant Plateau and displaced the native population.

== Features of the Adrar ==
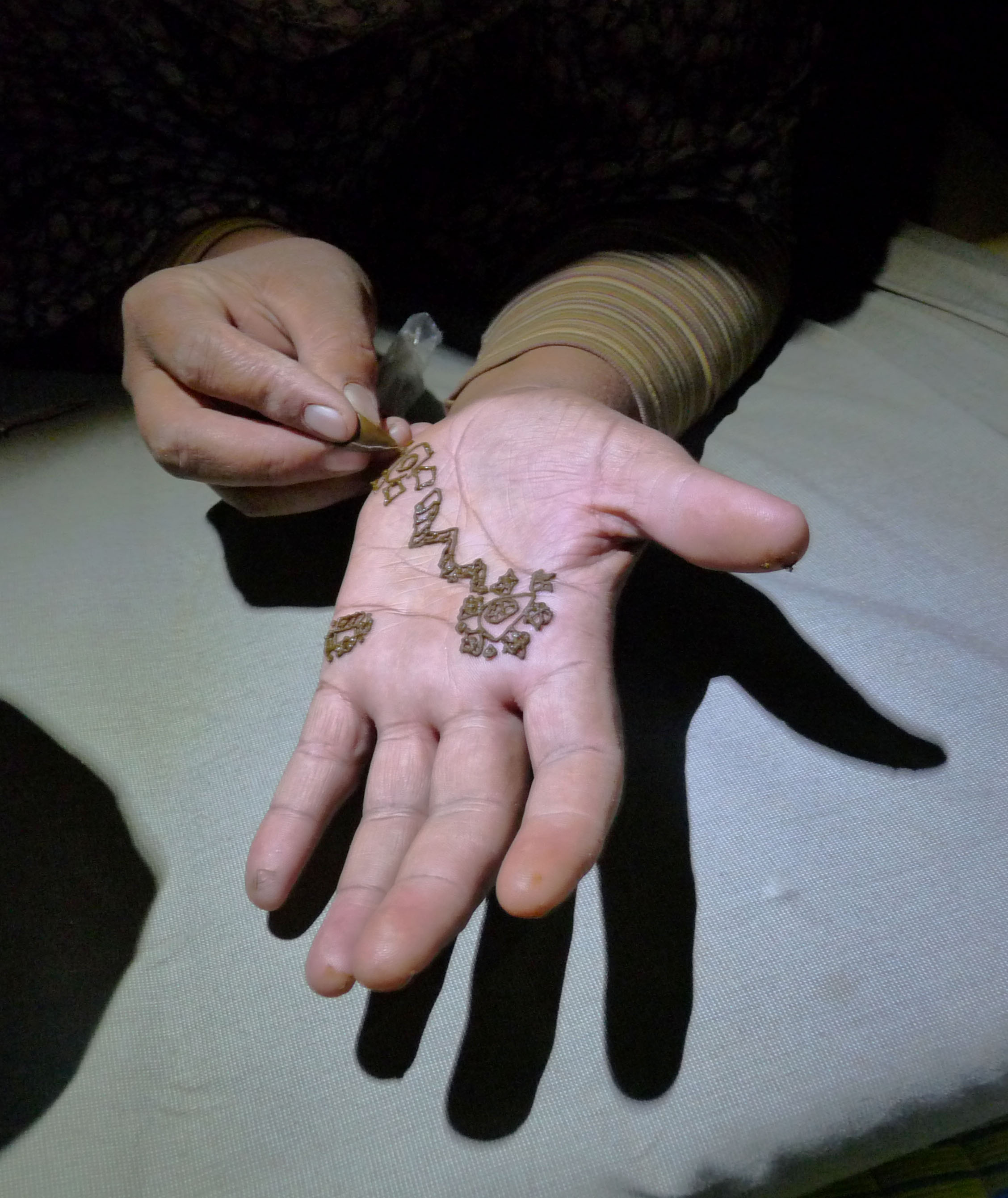
Henna design on the hand of a girl of the region

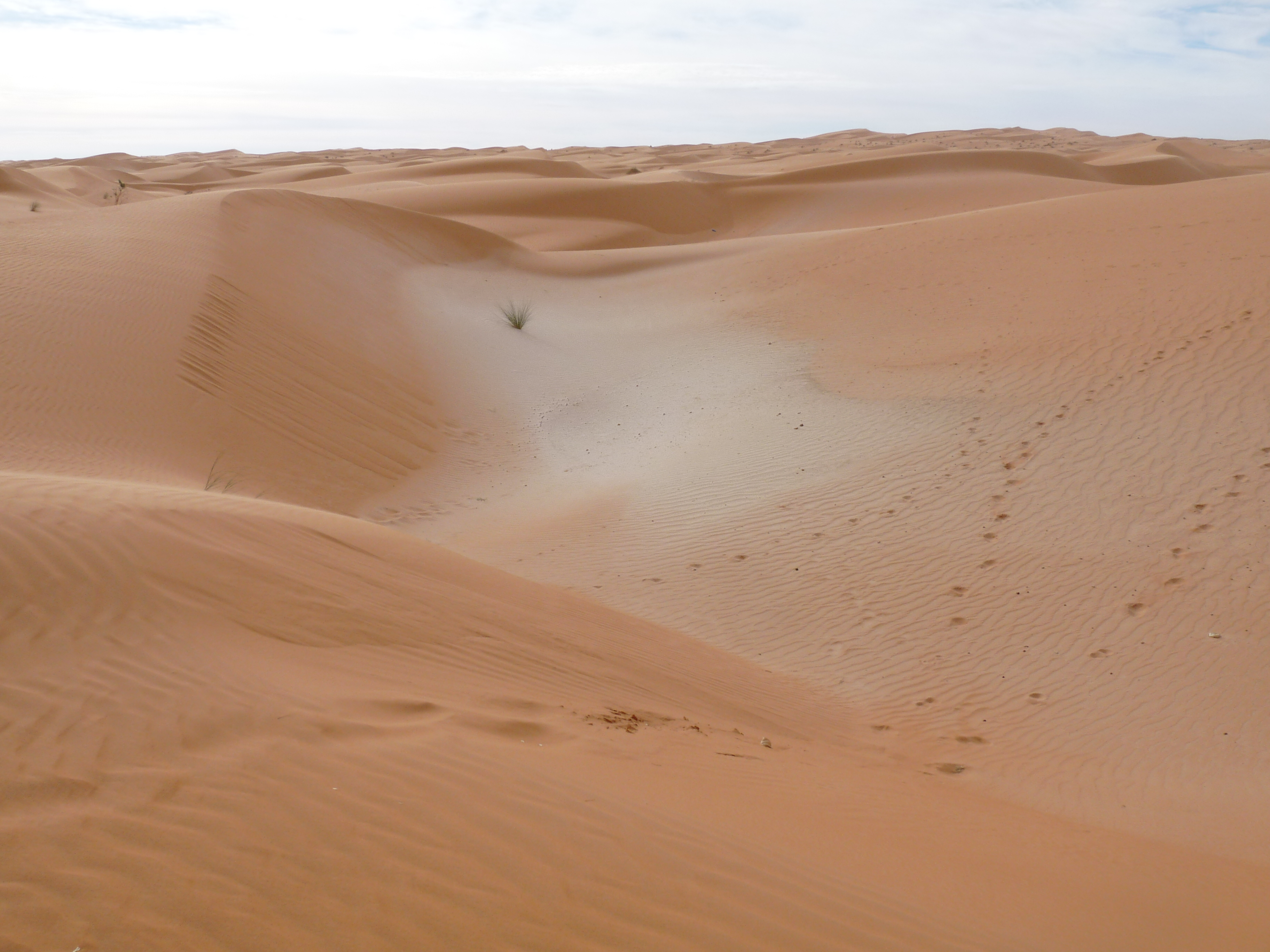
A sandy area west of Chinguetti

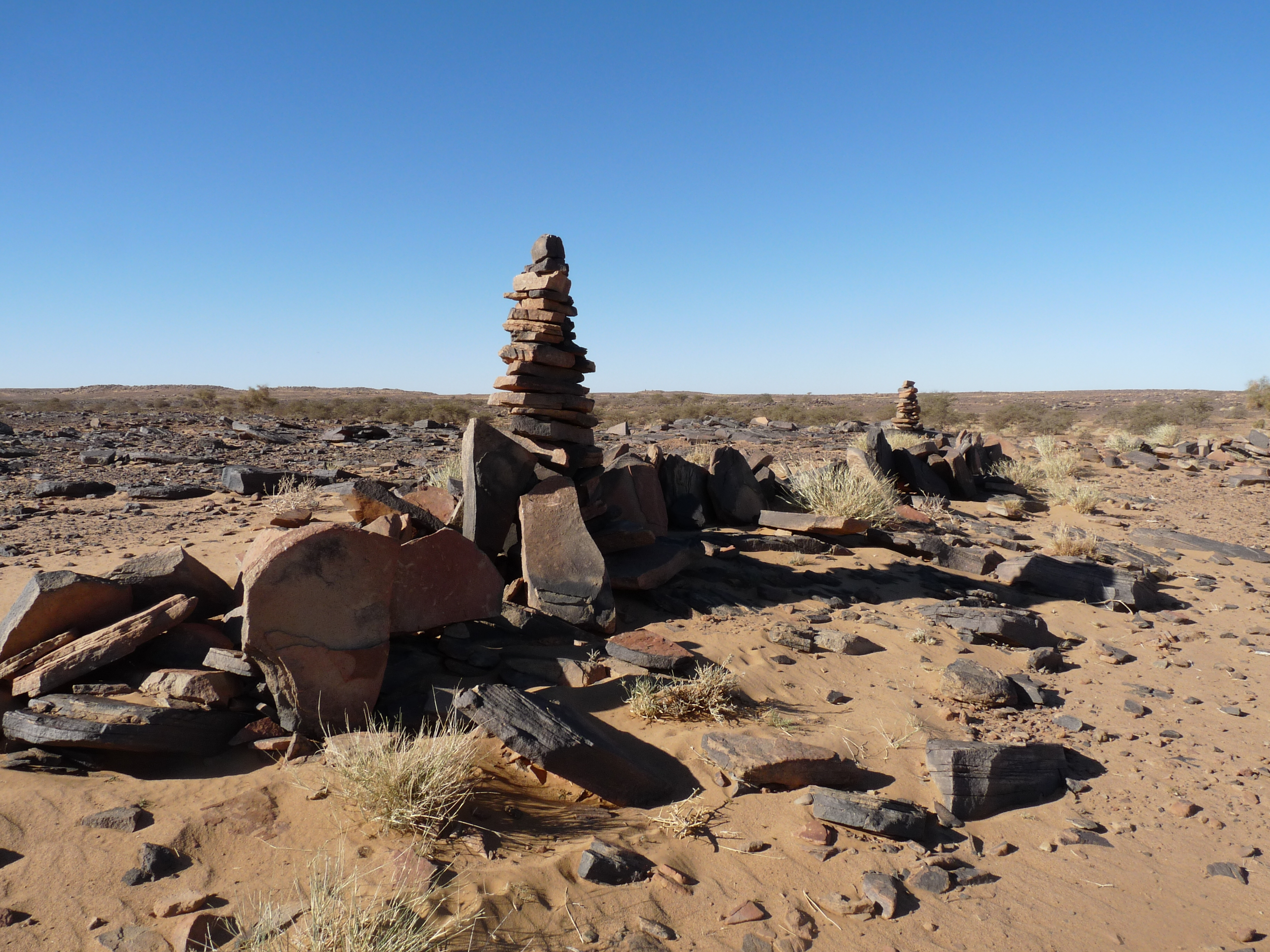
A stone cairn

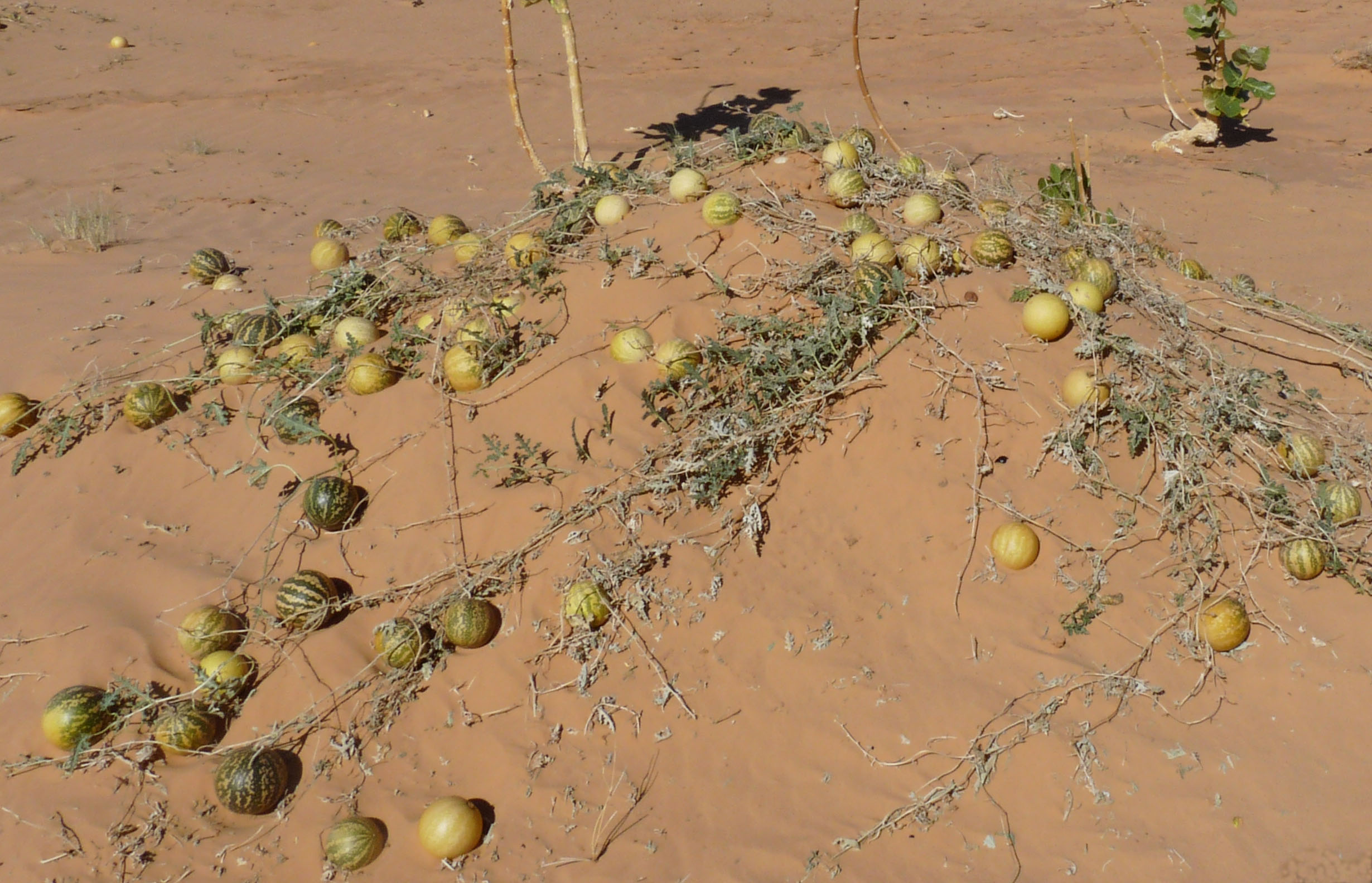
Colocynths in the Adrar desert

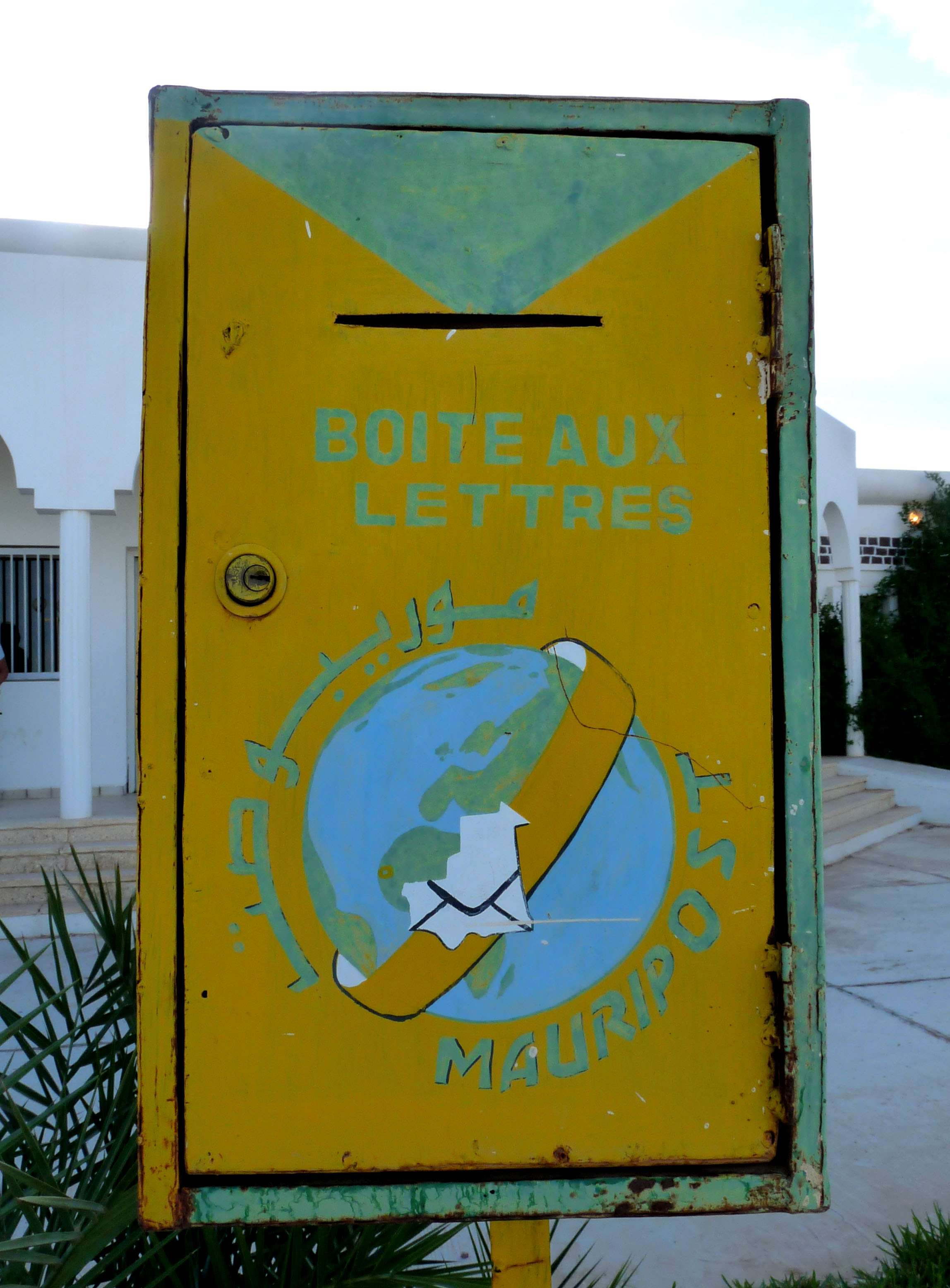
A postbox in the airport of Atar, the Adrar's main town

== See also ==
- Geography of Mauritania
