= Atar, Mauritania =

Atar أطار
- Commune and town
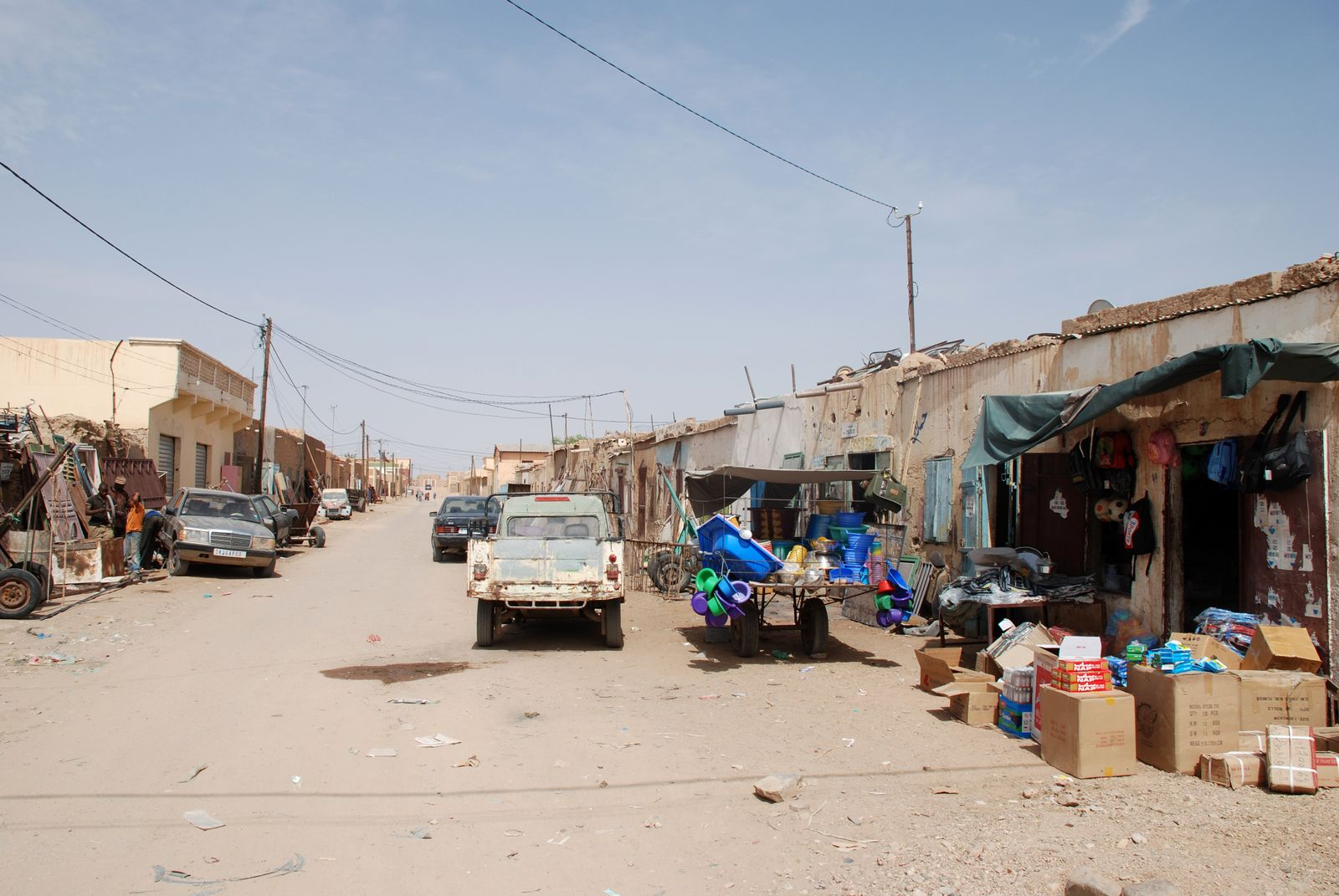
- Atar Market Street

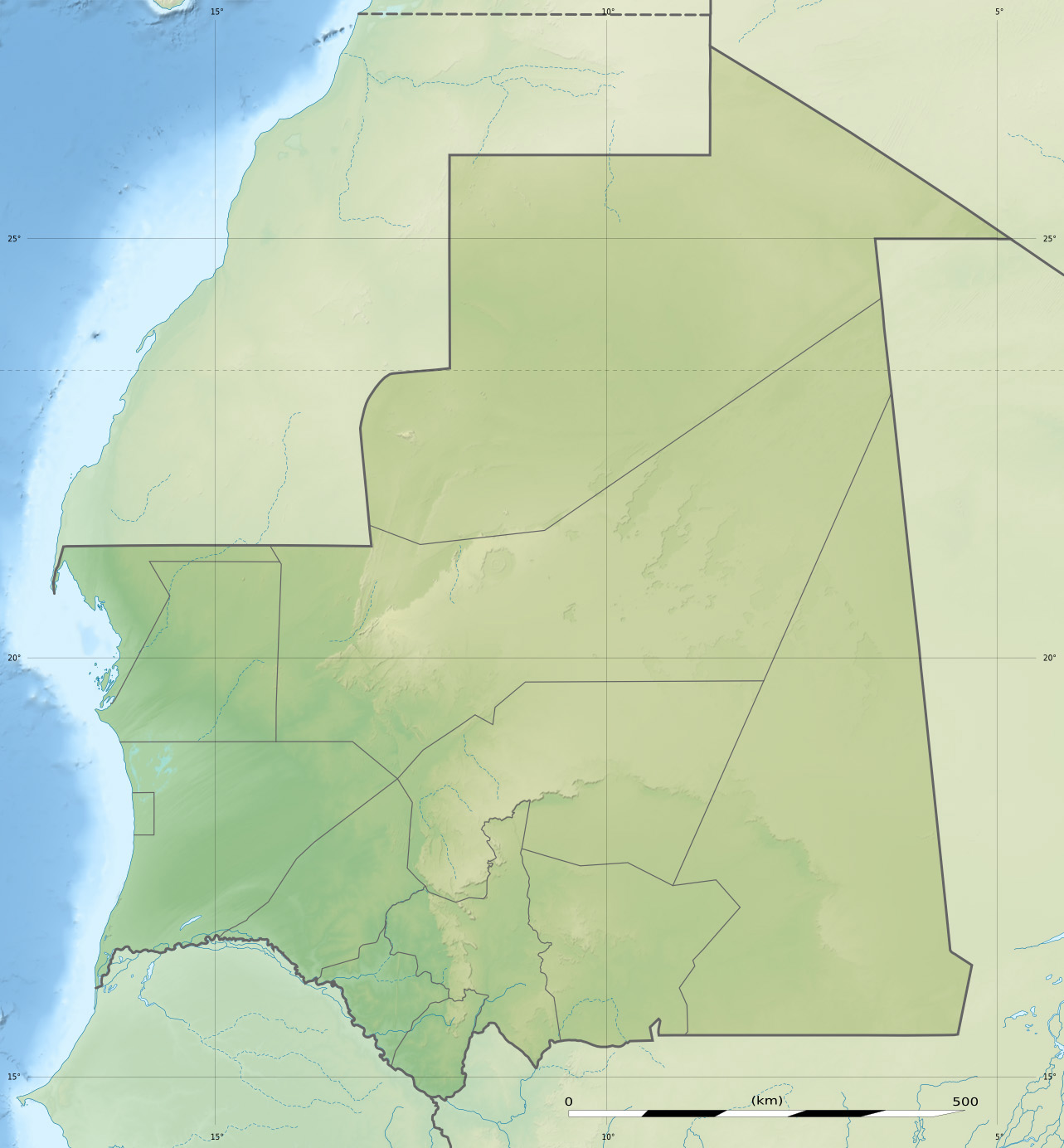
- Location in Mauritania
- Coordinates: 20°31′N 13°03′W
- Country: Mauritania
- Region: Adrar Region

Area
  - Total: 200.8 km^{2} (77.5 sq mi)
- Elevation: 270 m (890 ft)

Population (2023 census)
  - Total: 35,170
  - Density: 175.1/km^{2} (453.6/sq mi)
- Time zone: UTC+00:00 (GMT)

Atar (Arabic: أطار, Berber for mountain) is a town in northwestern Mauritania, the capital of the Adrar Region and the main settlement on the Adrar Plateau. Situated on the Oued Seguellil, it is home to an airport, a museum and a historic mosque, constructed in 1674.

In 2023, it had a population of 35,170.

== Geology and geography ==
The Adrar's mountains are from the primary era, against the precambrian Tiris Zemmour. Near Atar, there are stromatolites and in the north is Choum. A train goes from Nouadhibou to Zouerate. East of Atar, through Amojjar Pass, is the difficult passage to Chinguetti, Ouadane and the Richat Structure.

== Climate ==
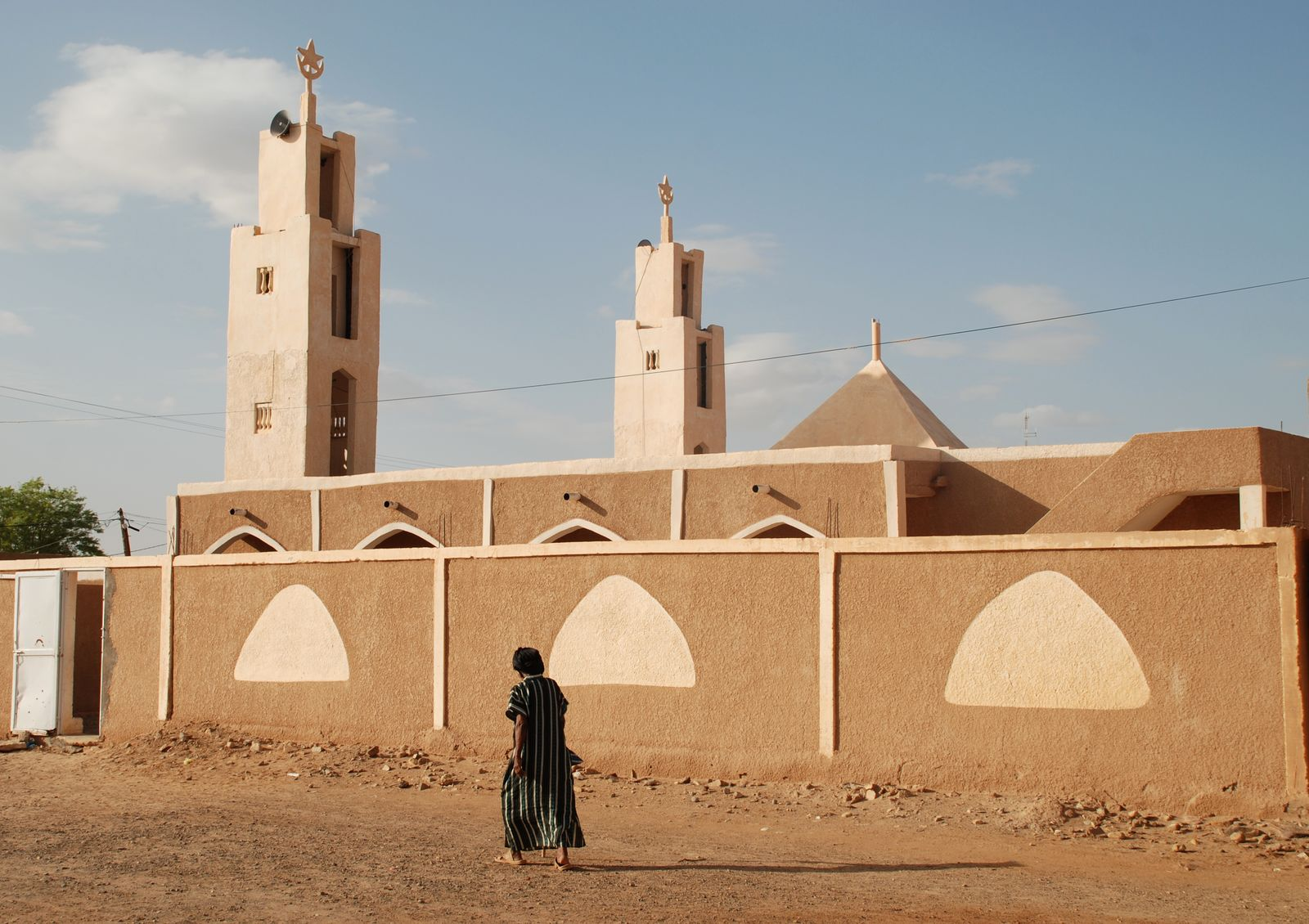
Atar Mosque

Atar has a hot desert climate (Köppen climate classification BWh) typical of the Sahara Desert, south of the tropic of Cancer. The weather is usually very hot, very sunny and very dry but it can be overcast sometimes. The annual average temperature is close to 30 °C (86 °F), meaning that excessive heat persists year-round. The annual mean rainfall amount is very low, averaging 108 mm (4.3 in) and it mainly falls in August and in September while the sunshine duration is high, at 3,365 h of bright sunshine yearly. In 2019, Khadijetou Lekweiry reported the first appearance of the Plasmodium vivax parasite in the town.

Climate data for Atar
Month	Jan	Feb	Mar	Apr	May	Jun	Jul	Aug	Sep	Oct	Nov	Dec	Year
Mean daily maximum °C (°F)	27.6 (81.7)	30.3 (86.5)	33.4 (92.1)	35.3 (95.5)	39.1 (102.4)	41.8 (107.2)	41.7 (107.1)	40.7 (105.3)	39.6 (103.3)	36.8 (98.2)	32.5 (90.5)	27.3 (81.1)	35.5 (95.9)
Daily mean °C (°F)	20.0 (68.0)	22.6 (72.7)	26.0 (78.8)	28.7 (83.7)	31.4 (88.5)	34.6 (94.3)	35.6 (96.1)	35.2 (95.4)	33.7 (92.7)	31.0 (87.8)	25.6 (78.1)	21.3 (70.3)	28.8 (83.8)
Mean daily minimum °C (°F)	12.5 (54.5)	14.0 (57.2)	16.3 (61.3)	18.6 (65.5)	22.7 (72.9)	26.3 (79.3)	27.0 (80.6)	26.6 (79.9)	25.9 (78.6)	22.2 (72.0)	18.0 (64.4)	13.1 (55.6)	20.3 (68.5)
Average precipitation mm (inches)	1 (0.0)	1 (0.0)	1 (0.0)	1 (0.0)	1 (0.0)	8 (0.3)	8 (0.3)	33 (1.3)	35 (1.4)	8 (0.3)	10 (0.4)	1 (0.0)	108 (4.3)
Average relative humidity (%)	39	34	33	29	27	28	39	45	40	36	38	41	36
Mean monthly sunshine hours	257.3	259.9	294.5	309.0	325.5	309.0	288.3	291.4	264.0	263.5	252.0	251.1	3,365.5
Mean daily sunshine hours	8.3	9.2	9.5	10.3	10.5	10.3	9.3	9.4	8.8	8.5	8.4	8.1	9.2
Source: Arab Meteorology Book

== Tourism ==
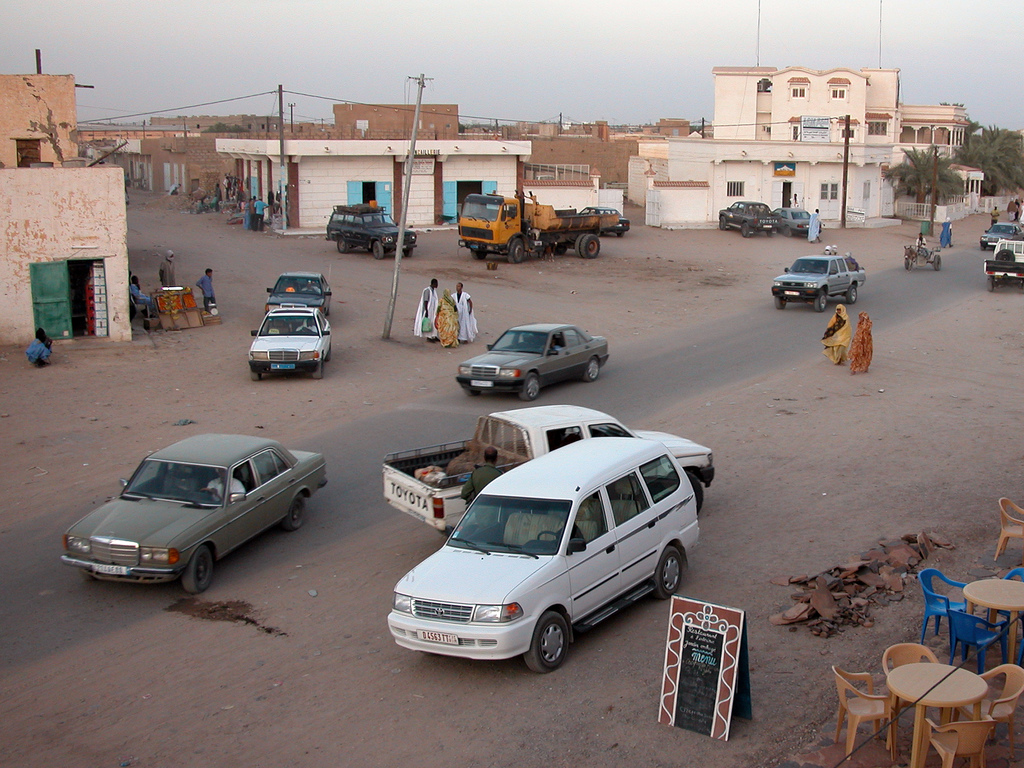
Atar Centre

Today, the Atar is best known to outsiders as an entryway for tourists to visit the ruins of the ancient Moorish cities of Ouadane and Chinguetti. It was a key stop in the world's longest off-road race, the Paris Dakar Rally, held every January.

== Small business sector ==
The "samaras" (from Arab smela : sole) are made in Atar and well known in Mauritania. It's a leather sole with straps.

== Military ==
In 2012, an air force school was founded in Atar to train pilots and crew for the Military of Mauritania.

== Notable people ==
- Med Hondo - film director (1936–2019)
- Maaouya Ould Sid'Ahmed Taya - 5th President of Mauritania (born 1941)
