= List of World Heritage Sites in Mauritania =

Location of World Heritage Sites in Mauritania. The red dots represent the cultural sites of Ancient Ksour, the green dot is a natural site.

The United Nations Educational, Scientific and Cultural Organization (UNESCO) designates World Heritage Sites of outstanding universal value to cultural or natural heritage which have been nominated by countries which are signatories to the UNESCO World Heritage Convention, established in 1972. Cultural heritage consists of monuments (such as architectural works, monumental sculptures, or inscriptions), groups of buildings, and sites (including archaeological sites). Natural heritage consists of natural features (physical and biological formations), geological and physiographical formations (including habitats of threatened species of animals and plants), and natural sites which are important from the point of view of science, conservation, or natural beauty. Mauritania ratified the convention on March 2, 1981, making its historical sites eligible for inclusion on the list.

As of 2025, Mauritania has two World Heritage Sites. The Banc d'Arguin National Park was the first Mauritanian World Heritage Site inscribed in 1989. It is the only natural site in Mauritania. The Ancient Ksour of Ouadane, Chinguetti, Tichitt and Oualata, the most recent and only cultural site, was inscribed in 1996.

== World Heritage Sites ==
UNESCO lists sites under ten criteria; each entry must meet at least one of the criteria. Criteria i through vi are cultural, and vii through x are natural.

† In danger

World Heritage Sites
Site	Image	Location (region)	Year listed	UNESCO data	Description
Banc d'Arguin National Park		Dakhlet Nouadhibou Region, Inchiri Region	1989	506; ix, x (natural)	Fringing the Atlantic coast, the park comprises sand-dunes, coastal swamps, small islands and shallow coastal waters. The contrast between the harsh desert environment and the biodiversity of the marine zone has resulted in a land- and seascape of outstanding natural significance. A wide variety of migrating birds spend the winter there. Several species of sea turtle and dolphin, used by the fishermen to attract shoals of fish, can also be found.
Ancient Ksour of Ouadane, Chinguetti, Tichitt and Oualata		Adrar Region, Hodh Ech Chargui, Tagant Region	1996	750; iii, iv, v (cultural)	Founded in the 11th and 12th centuries to serve the caravans crossing the Sahara, these trading and religious centres became focal points of Islamic culture. They have managed to preserve an urban fabric that evolved between the 12th and 16th centuries. Typically, houses with patios crowd along narrow streets around a mosque with a square minaret. They illustrate a traditional way of life centred on the nomadic culture of the people of the western Sahara.

== Tentative List ==
In addition to sites inscribed on the World Heritage List, member states can maintain a list of tentative sites that they may consider for nomination. Nominations for the World Heritage List are only accepted if the site was previously listed on the tentative list. As of 2023, Mauritania has listed three properties on its tentative list.

Tentative sites
Site	Image	Location (region)	Year listed	UNESCO criteria	Description
Azougui Cultural Landscape		Adrar Region	2001	iii, iv, v, vi (cultural)	
Kumbi Saleh Archaeological Site		Hodh Ech Chargui Region	2001	iii, iv, v, vi (cultural)	
Tegdaoust Archaeological Site		Hodh El Gharbi Region	2001	iii, v (cultural)	

== See also ==
- List of Intangible Cultural Heritage elements in Mauritania
