= Chinguetti Mosque =

Mosque in Chinguetti, Adrar, Mauritania

- Arabic: مسجد شنقيط
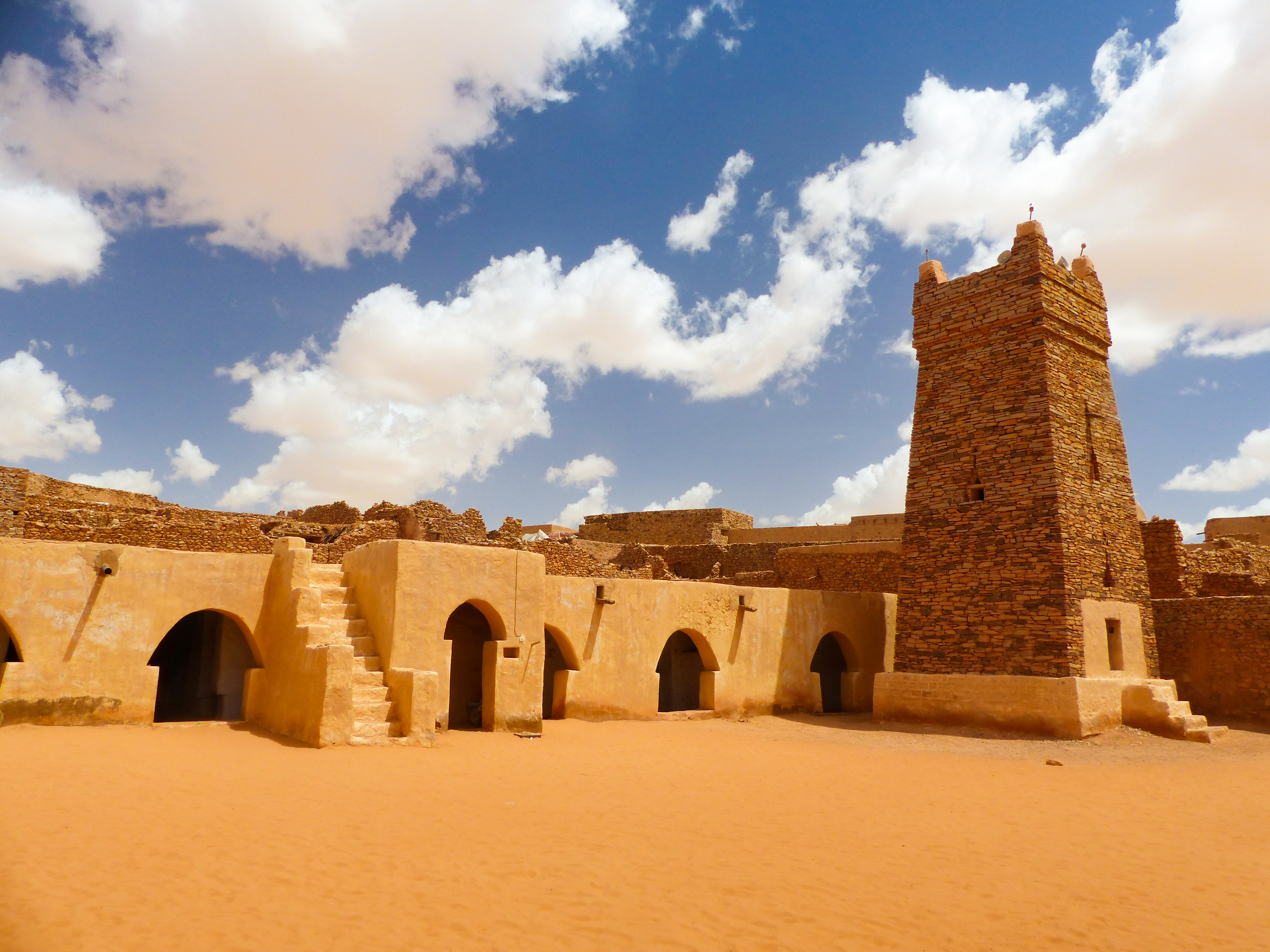
- The mosque in 2019

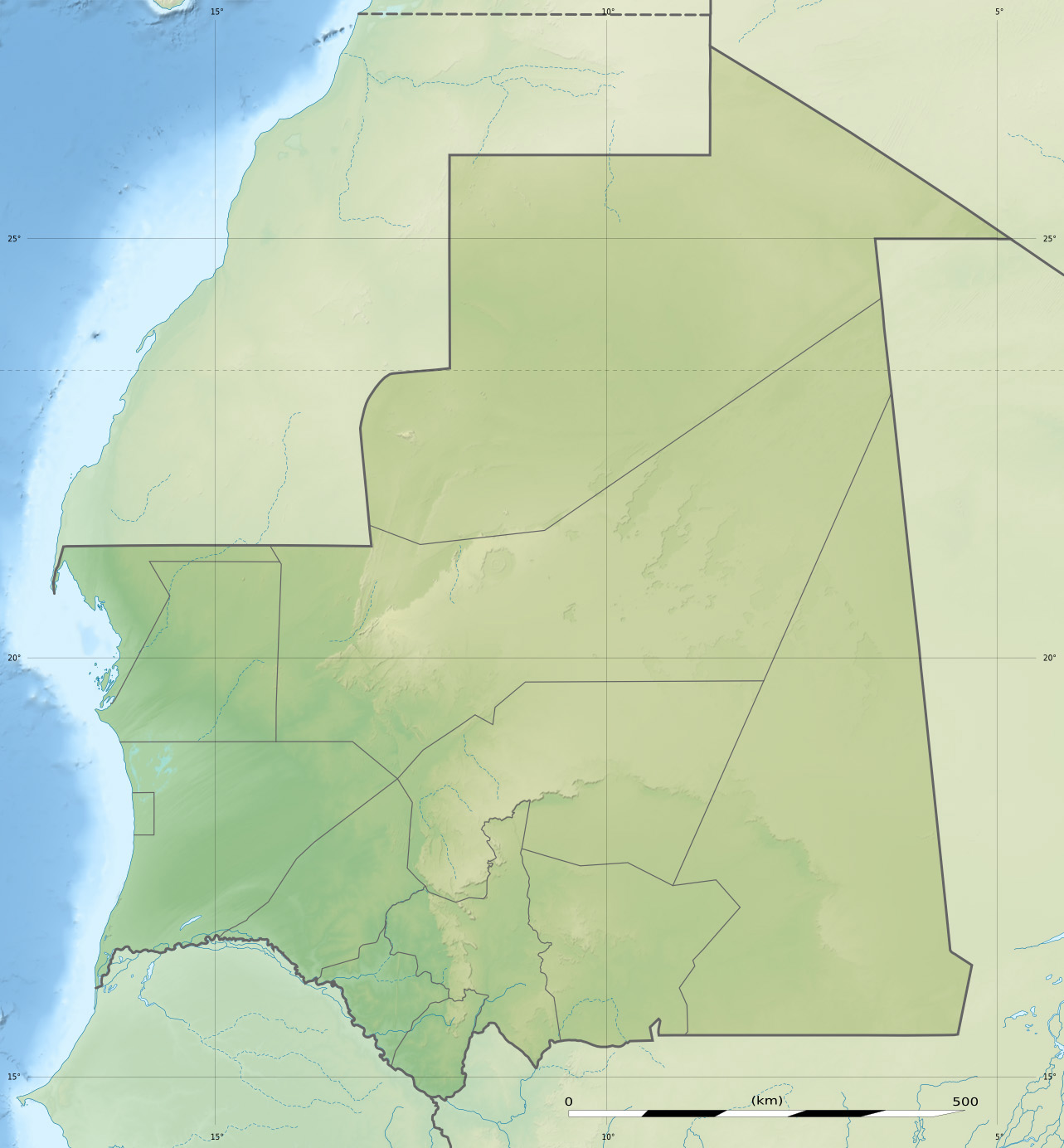
- Location of the mosque in Mauritania

Religion
- Affiliation: Sunni Islam
- Ecclesiastical or organizational status: Mosque
- Status: Active

Location
- Location: Chinguetti, Adrar
- Country: Mauritania
- Interactive map of Chinguetti Mosque
- Coordinates: 20°27′48″N 12°22′0″W

Architecture
- Type: Mosque architecture
- Style: Soninké; Soninké
- Groundbreaking: 13th-14th century

Specifications
- Minaret: One
- Materials: Stone; clay

The Chinguetti Mosque (Arabic: مسجد شنقيط, romanized: Masjid Shinqīṭ), also known as the Chinguetti Great Mosque, is a Sunni Islam mosque in Chinguetti, Adrar Region, Mauritania. The minaret of this ancient structure is claimed to be the second oldest in continuous use anywhere in the Muslim world.

The mosque is located within the Ancient Ksour of Ouadane, Chinguetti, Tichitt and Oualata, a 54.7 ha (135-acre) UNESCO World Heritage Site, listed in 1996.

== Overview ==
The mosque is constructed of split stone and clay with a roof of palm beams on stone piers. Architecturally, the structure features a prayer room with four aisles as well as a double-niched symbolic door, or mihrab pointing towards Mecca and an open courtyard. The twin mihrab and minbar niches are built into the qibla wall, which is typical of the mosques of the region.

Among its most distinctive characteristics are its spare, unmortared, split stone masonry, its square minaret tower, and its conscious lack of adornment, keeping with the strict Malikite beliefs of the city's founders. The mosque and its minaret is popularly considered the national emblem of the Islamic Republic of Mauritania.

The mosque was restored through a UNESCO effort, but it, along with the city itself, continues to be threatened by intense desertification.

== See also ==
- Islam in Mauritania
- List of mosques in Mauritania
