= Mesosiderite =

Class of stony–iron meteorites

- — Class —
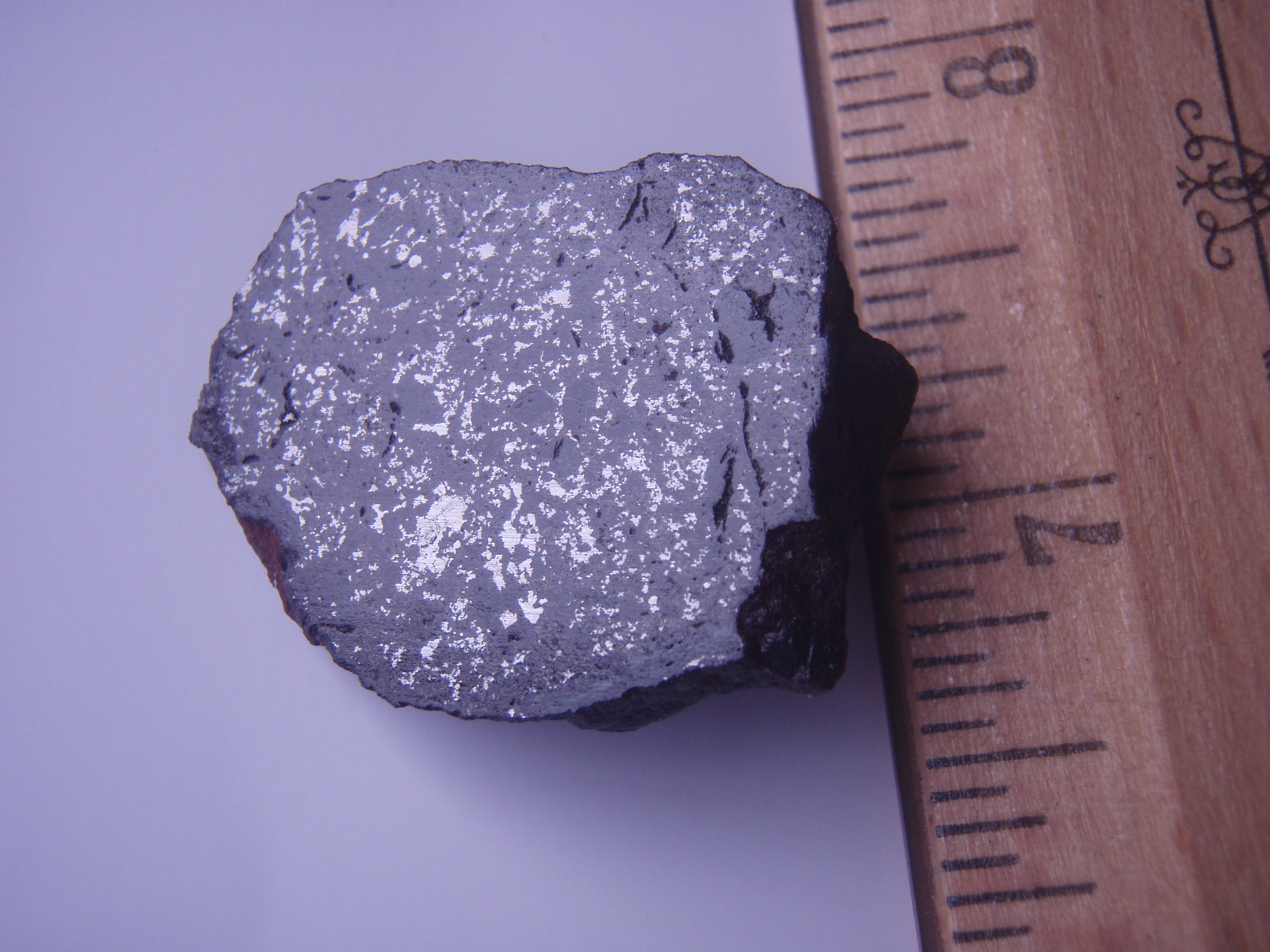
- Vaca muerta mesosiderite.
- Type: Stony-iron
- Subgroups: A; B; C; anomalous
- Composition: Meteoric iron (kamacite, taenite & tetrataenite); silicates (mostly pyroxene & Ca-rich plagioclase); sulphides (troilite)
- Total known specimens: 208
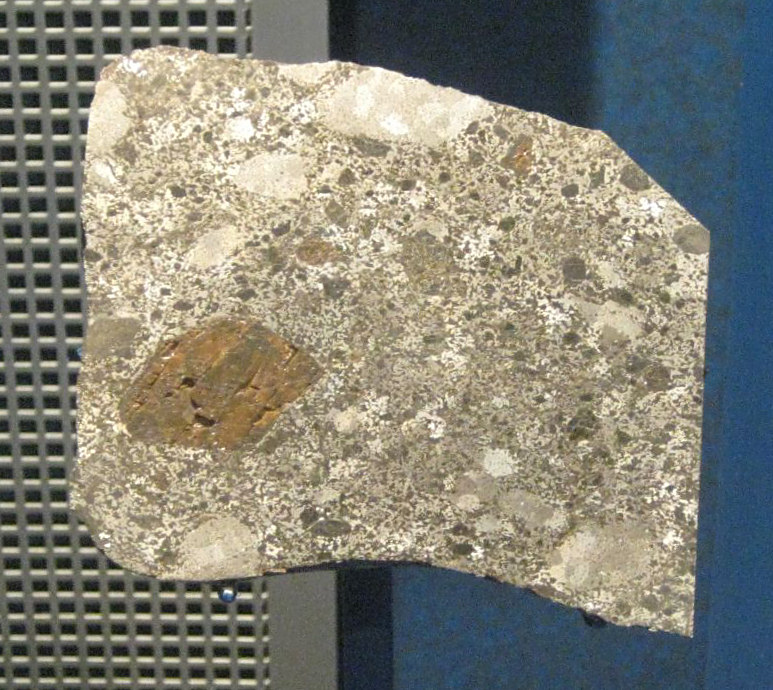
- Chinguetti mesosiderite

Mesosiderites are a class of stony–iron meteorites consisting of about equal parts of metallic nickel-iron and silicate. They are breccias with an irregular texture; silicates and metal occur often in lumps or pebbles as well as in fine-grained intergrowths. The silicate part contains olivine, pyroxenes, and Ca-rich feldspar and is similar in composition to eucrites and diogenites.

They are a rare type of meteorite; as of November 2014 only 208 are known (of which 56 come from Antarctica) and only 7 of these are observed falls. On the other hand, some mesosiderites are among the largest meteorites known.

At Vaca Muerta in the Atacama Desert in Chile, many fragments with a total mass of 3.8 tons were found in a large strewnfield. They were first discovered in the 19th century by ore prospectors who mistook the shiny metal inclusions for silver and thought they had found an outcrop of a silver ore deposit. Later when an analysis was made and nickel-iron was found, the true nature as a meteorite was established. The meteorite was called Vaca Muerta. The picture at right shows a cut and polished piece of Vaca Muerta.

The most recent fall of a mesosiderite occurred at Dong Ujimqin Qi in China, on September 7, 1995, where three large pieces with a total mass of 129 kilograms (284 lb) fell. The fall of the Estherville mesosiderite in Iowa, US occurred on May 10, 1879. After a brilliant fireball had been seen, a shower of several large masses and many small fragments fell, totaling 320 kilograms (710 lb). The fall at Lowicz in Poland on March 12, 1935, yielded many (more than 50) fragments with a total weight of 59 kilograms (130 lb). The other observed mesosiderite falls occurred in 1842 at Barea (Spain), in 1880 at Varamin (Iran), in 1933 at Dyarrl Island (Papua New Guinea), and at Patwar (India) in 1935. The legendary Chinguetti meteorite is also supposed to be a mesosiderite.

The asteroid 16 Psyche is a candidate for the parent body of the mesosiderites. However, a reliable delivery mechanism lacks for Psyche, and spectral analysis indicates the mesosiderites derive from the Maria family of asteroids.

== See also ==
- Glossary of meteoritics
