= Chinguetti meteorite =

Alleged find near Chinguetti, Mauritania

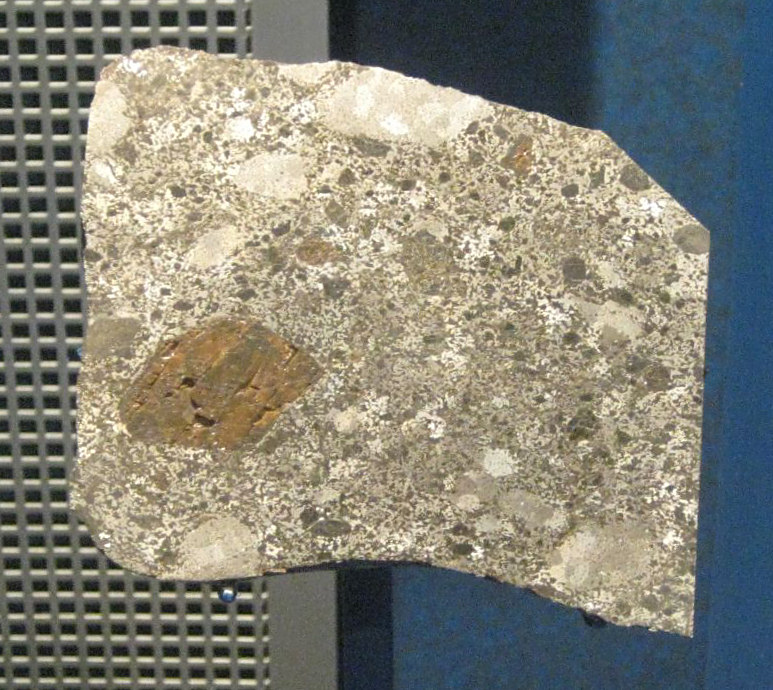
- Chinguetti slice at the National Museum of Natural History, USA.
- Type: Stony-iron
- Class: Mesosiderite
- Country: Mauritania
- Region: Chinguetti
- Observed fall: No
- Found date: 1916

The Chinguetti meteorite is a find reputed to come from a large unconfirmed 'iron mountain' in Africa.

The existence of a huge stony-iron mesosiderite approximately 45 kilometers from the Saharan city Chinguetti, Mauritania, has been a mystery since 1916, when Captain Gaston Ripert, a French consular official, claimed to have discovered 'a huge iron hill 40 metres (130 ft) high and 100 metres (330 ft) long.'

Ripert said that he had been guided blindfolded by a local chieftain to a natural source of iron, after a 12-hour-long camel ride to the south-east of Chinguetti.

He bagged a 4-kilogram fragment of the rock, which found its way to Paris some years later, where geologist Alfred Lacroix pronounced that it was an important discovery. However, despite the attempts of several expeditions since, the supposed meteorite could not be found again.

Ripert wrote to Professor Théodore Monod in 1934: 'I know that the general opinion is that the stone does not exist; that to some, I am purely and simply an impostor who picked up a metallic specimen. That to others, I am a simpleton who mistook a sandstone outcrop for an enormous meteorite. I shall do nothing to disabuse them, I know only what I saw.'

Despite various searches over the years, Monod concluded in 1989 that Ripert had been mistaken: 'An error was made in the identification of the rock of a 40-metre hill that is entirely sedimentary with no trace of metal,' he wrote.

In 1980, former French air force officer Jacques Gallouédec was carrying out aerial surveys for the Mauritanian water authority, when he spotted a strange semi-circular ground formation to the south-east of Chinguetti. He sent details to Théodore Monod, but the professor was unable to locate it.

Finally, the Chinguetti fragment that was sent to Paris was analyzed again, and it was concluded that it could not have been from a meteorite larger than 80 cm (31 in) in radius.

== See also ==
- Glossary of meteoritics
