= Chinguetti oil field =

Oil field near Mauritania

The Chinguetti oilfield is an oil field located off the Mauritanian coast in 800 m water depth. It was discovered by the Australian firm Woodside Petroleum in 2001. It is named after the city of Chinguetti.

Relatively modest in size, originally estimated at 123 million barrels (19,600,000 m^{3}), this deposit is nonetheless significant as the first commercial discovery of oil in the country, opening a new region for offshore petroleum exploration. Production of 75,000 barrels per day (11,900 m^{3}/d) began in early 2006 via an FPSO. Production declined rapidly after the start of production due to geological complexity. In November 2006 Woodside issued a statement cutting the field's 2P reserves to 53 million barrels (8,400,000 m^{3}). Woodside expect production of 20,000 barrels per day (3,200 m^{3}/d) to 30,000 barrels per day (4,800 m^{3}/d) in the next few years.

A smaller oil field, Tevet, was discovered in the same area in early 2005, and will probably develop as a satellite - meaning that it will be exploited by wells tied back to Chinguetti's platform.

Two larger discoveries, Banda and Tiof, were also made off the coast of Mauritania, by the Woodside consortium in 2003.

In 2004, Woodside had agreed to invest US$ 600 million in developing the Chinguetti project. However, in February 2006, the Mauritanian military junta led by Ely Ould Mohamed Vall denounced amendments to an oil contract made by former President Maaouya Ould Sid'Ahmed Taya with Woodside Petroleum. The controversial amendments, which Mauritanian authorities declared that they had been signed "outside the legal framework of normal practice, to the great detriment of our country", could cost Mauritania up to $200 million a year, according to BBC News.

It was later sold to PETRONAS group. Production ceased in December 2017, and an abandonment programme was begun in 2019.
