= Oualata =

Oualata Arabic: ولاتة
- Commune and town
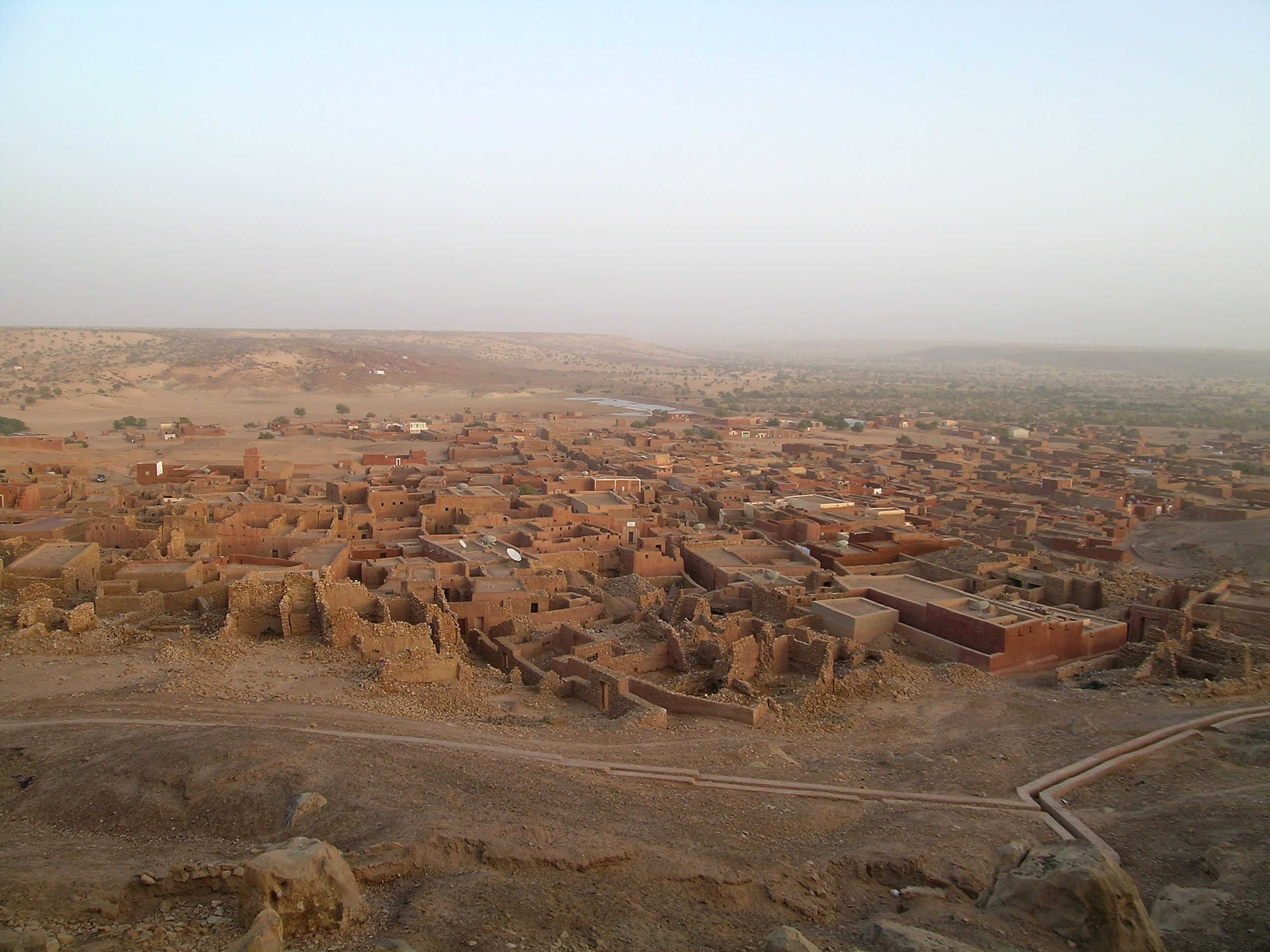
- View of the town looking in a southeasterly direction

- Location in Mauritania
- Coordinates: 17.3°N 7.025°W
- Country: Mauritania
- Region: Hodh Ech Chargui

Area
  - Total: 93,092 km^{2} (35,943 sq mi)

Population (2023 census)
  - Total: 4,782
  - Density: 0.05137/km^{2} (0.1330/sq mi)

UNESCO World Heritage Site
- Official name: Ancient Ksour of Ouadane, Chinguetti, Tichitt and Oualata
- Type: Cultural
- Criteria: iii, iv, v
- Designated: 1996 (20th session)
- Reference no.: 750
- Region: Arab States

Trade routes of the Western Sahara Desert c. 1000–1500. Goldfields are indicated by light brown shading: Bambuk, Bure, Lobi, and Akan.

Oualata or Walāta (Arabic: ولاتة) (also Biru in 17th century chronicles) is a small oasis town in southeast Mauritania, located at the eastern end of the Aoukar basin. Oualata was important as a caravan city in the thirteenth and fourteenth centuries as the southern terminus of a trans-Saharan trade route and now it is a World Heritage Site.

The whole Oualata commune has a total size of 93,092 square kilometres (35,943 sq mi), mostly consisting of desert. The main town is located in the south of the commune.

== History ==
The Oualata area is believed to have been first settled by an agro-pastoral people akin to the Mandé Soninke people who lived along the rocky promontories of the Tichitt-Oualata and Tagant cliffs of Mauritania facing the Aoukar basin. There, they built what are among the oldest stone settlements on the African continent.

The town formed part of the Ghana Empire and grew wealthy through trade. At the beginning of the thirteenth century Oualata replaced Aoudaghost as the principal southern terminus of the trans-Saharan trade and developed into an important commercial and religious centre. By the fourteenth century the city had become part of the Mali Empire.

An important trans-Saharan route began at Sijilmasa and passed through Taghaza with its salt mines and ended at Oualata. The French historian Raymond Mauny estimated that in the Middle Ages the town would have accommodated between 2000 and 3000 inhabitants.

Moroccan explorer Ibn Battuta found the inhabitants of Oualata were Muslim and mainly Massufa, a section of the Sanhaja. He was surprised by the great respect and independence that women enjoyed. He only gives a brief description of the town itself: "My stay at Iwalatan (Oualata) lasted about fifty days; and I was shown honour and entertained by its inhabitants. It is an excessively hot place, and boasts a few small date-palms, in the shade of which they sow watermelons. Its water comes from underground waterbeds at that point, and there is plenty of mutton to be had." His visit highlights the increased use of the Berber name Iwalatan at the expense of the original Mande name Biru, a reflection of the changing identity of the residents. Nevertheless, the Azayr language, a mix of Soninke (Mande) and Berber, was still spoken widely until at least the end of the 16th century.

From the second half of the fourteenth century Timbuktu gradually replaced Oualata as the southern terminus of the trans-Sahara route and it declined in importance, becoming an increasingly poor backwater in comparison to the previous wealth of the town. In 1433, the Mali Empire lost control of Walata. The town was besieged for a month and then sacked by the Mossi in 1480. The inhabitants managed to regroup, pursue the invaders as they made off with their spoils, and rescue many of the slaves who had been taken.

The Berber diplomat, traveller and author Leo Africanus visited the region in 1509–1510, and gives a description in his book Descrittione dell’Africa: "Walata Kingdom: This is a small kingdom, and of mediocre condition compared to the other kingdoms of the blacks. In fact, the only inhabited places are three large villages and some huts spread about among the palm groves." By that time, the composition of the kingdom seems to have changed to reflect a large Songhai-speaking population residing within the town. "The language of this region is called Songhai, and the inhabitants are black people, and the most friendly unto strangers." Oualata was a tributary of the Songhai Empire; also reflected within Africanus' book Descrittione dell’Africa explaining "In my time this region was conquered by the king of Timbuktu and the prince of Oualata fled into the deserts, whereof the king granted him peace conditionally that he pay great yearly tribute and so the prince has remained tributary to the king of Timbuktu until this present."

The early 17th century saw an influx of Hassaniya Arabs into the town, whose influence would lead to the development of the current name, Walata. The local political scene was dominated for a century and a half by the Lemhajib, a group of three Soninke families who, like the rest of Biru's Mande population, were gradually assimilated into the Berber and Arab milieu.

== Description ==
The old town covers an area of about 600 by 300 metres (1,970 by 980 ft), some of it now in ruins. The sandstone buildings are coated with banco and some are decorated with geometric designs. The mosque now lies on the eastern edge of the town but in earlier times may have been surrounded by other buildings. Oualata is home to a manuscript museum, and is known for its highly decorative vernacular architecture. It was made a UNESCO World Heritage Site in 1996 together with Ouadane, Chinguetti and Tichitt.

== Gallery ==
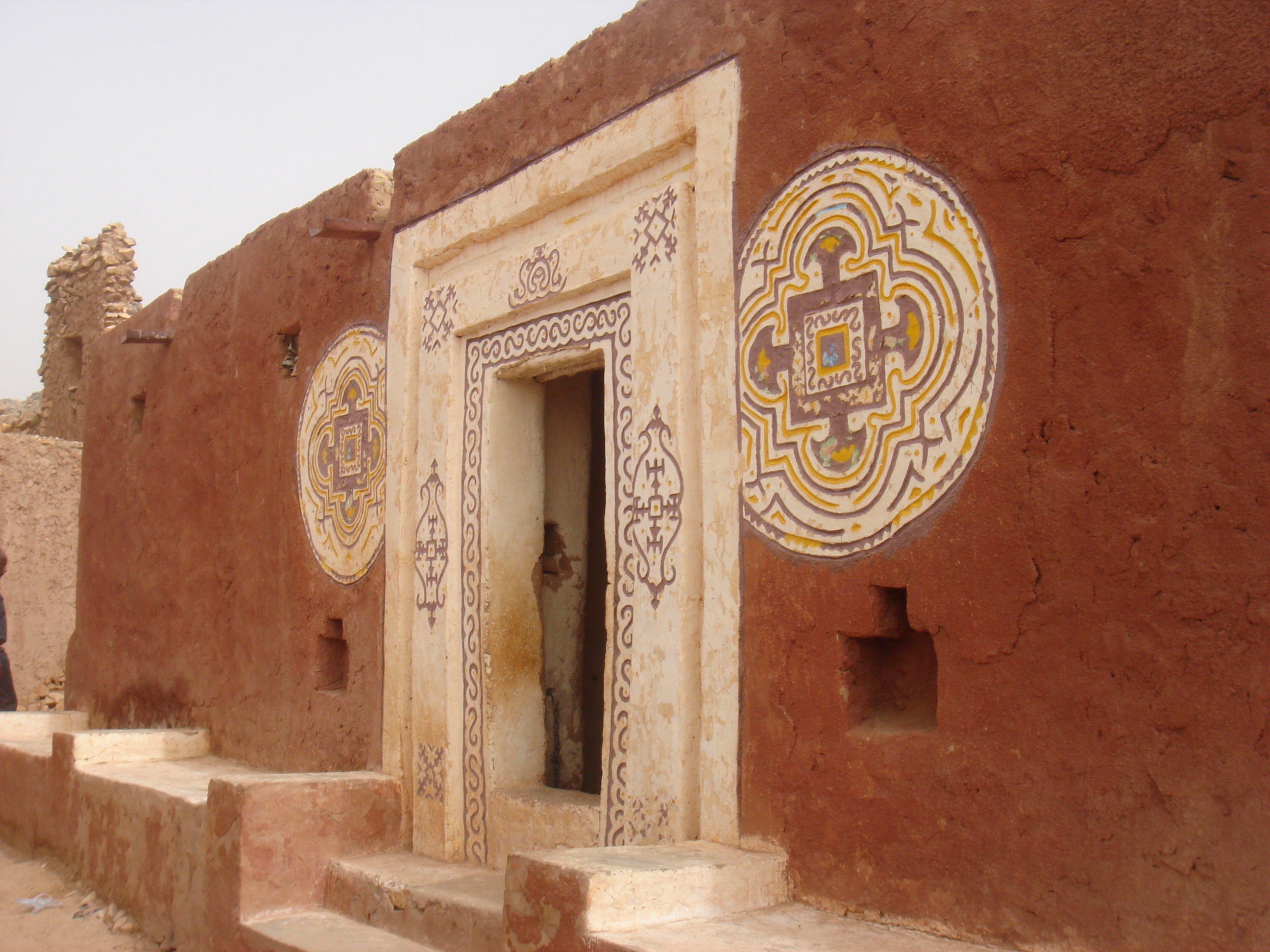
Oualata Decorative Entrance

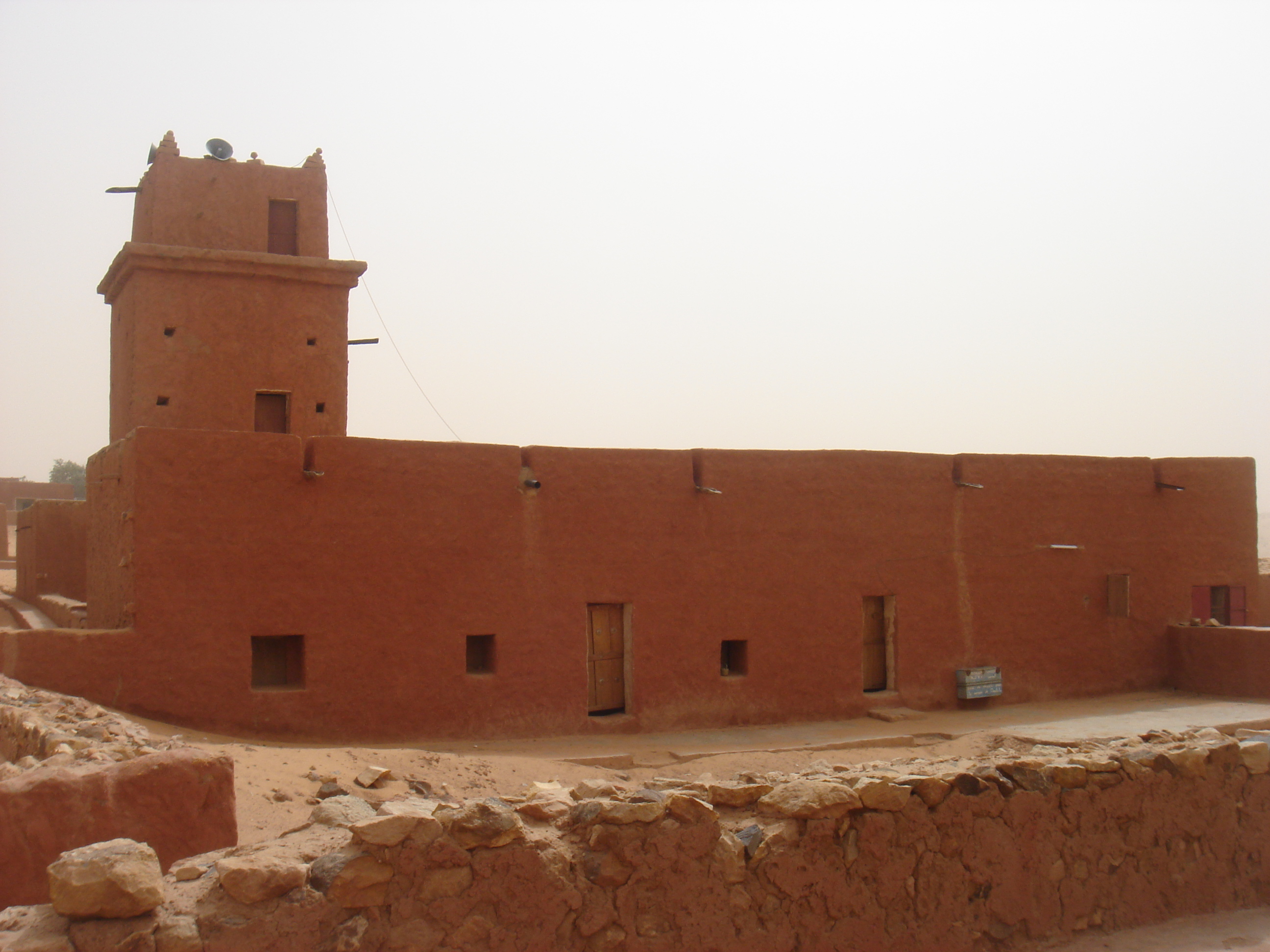
Oualata Mosque

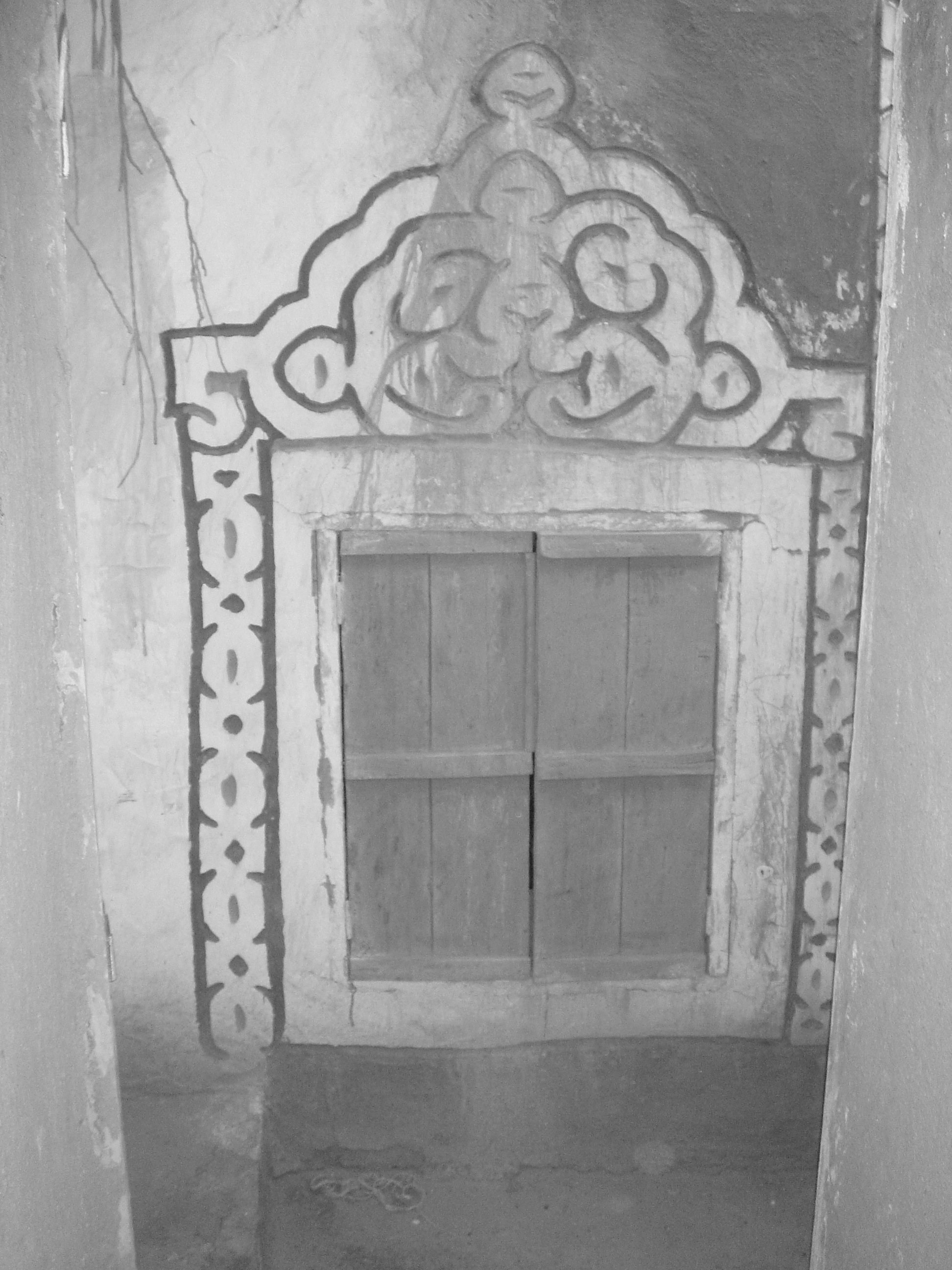
Oualata Decorative Window

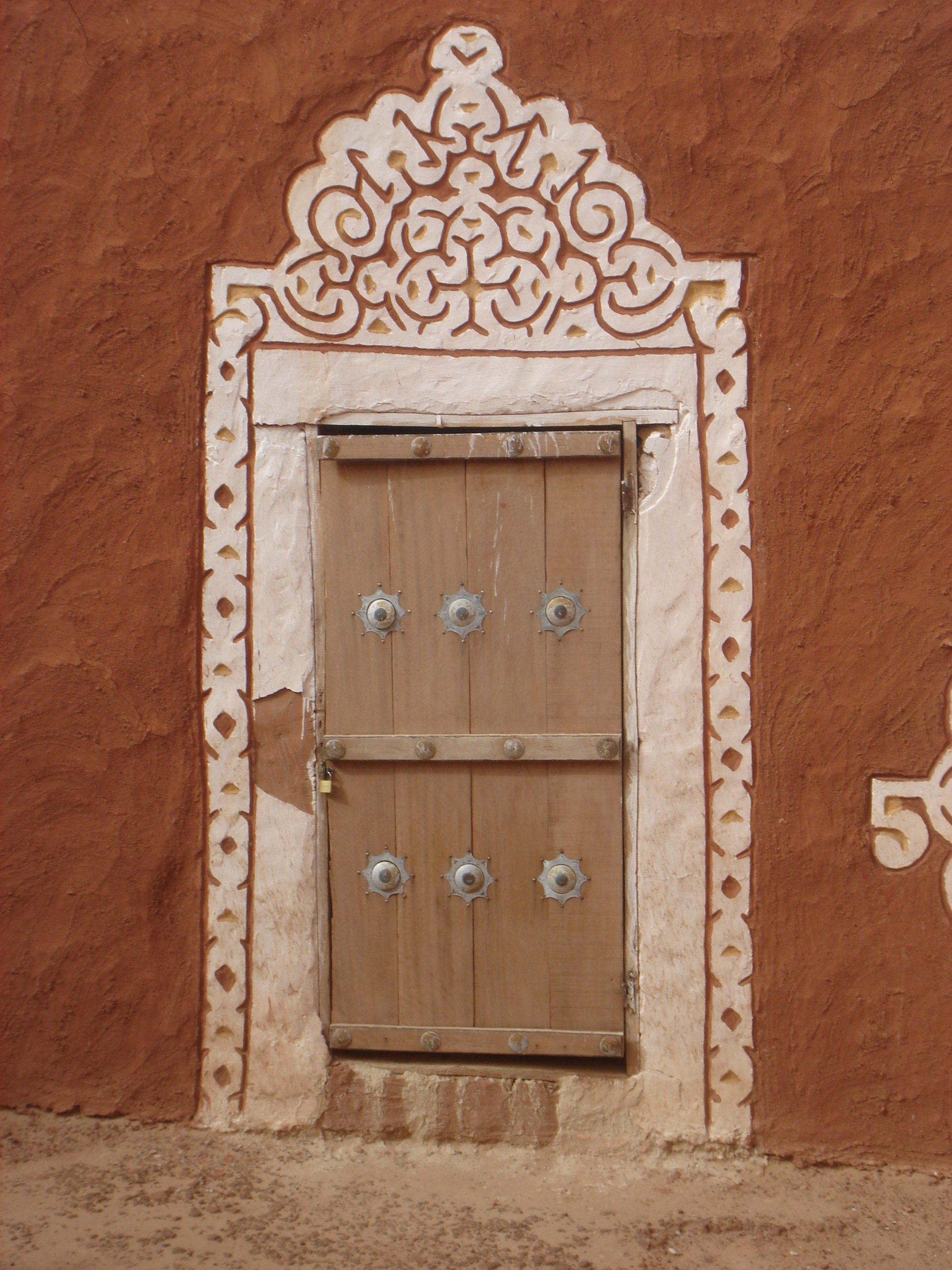
Oualata Decorative Secondary Entrance

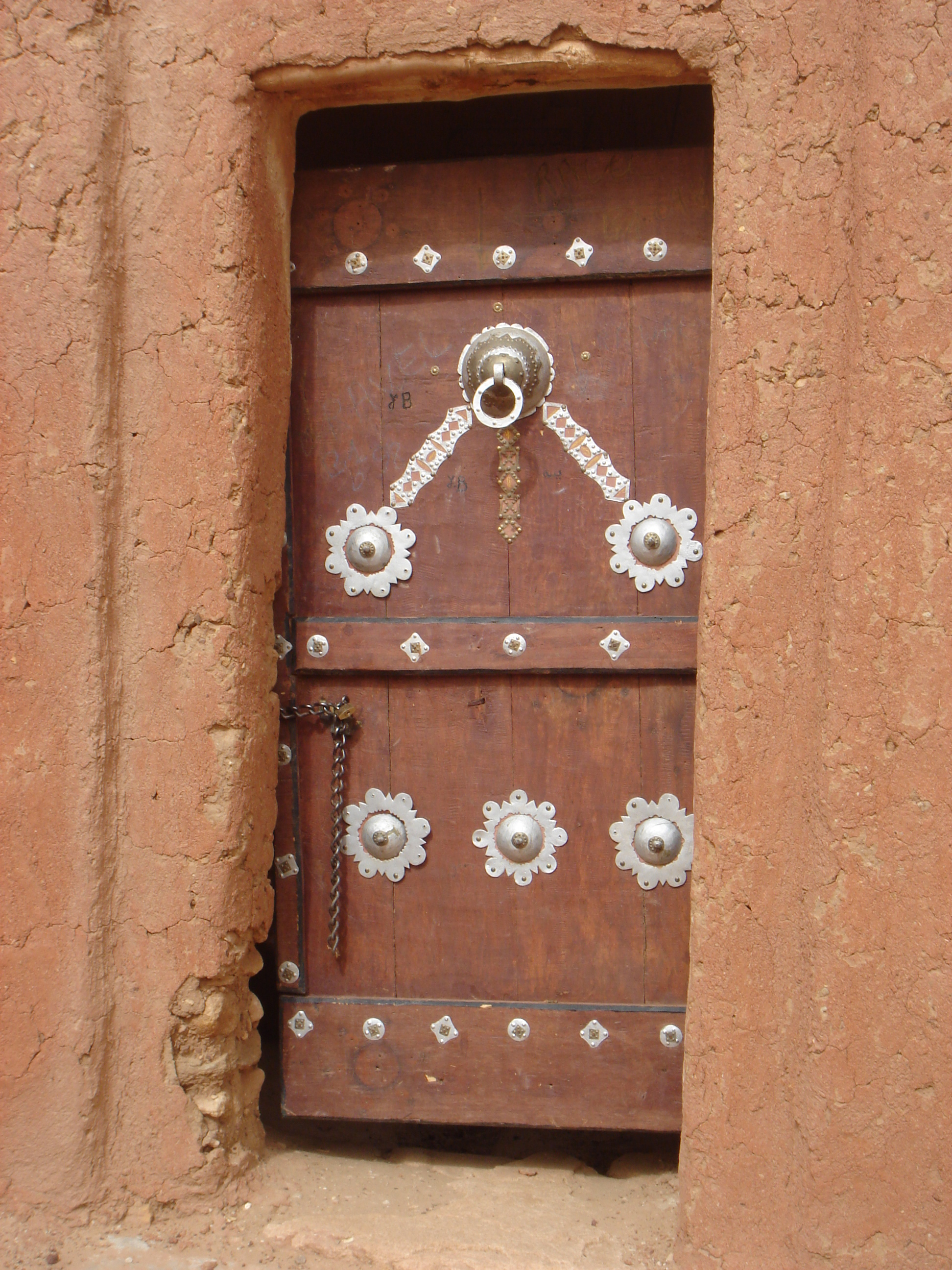
Oualata Decorative Secondary Entrance

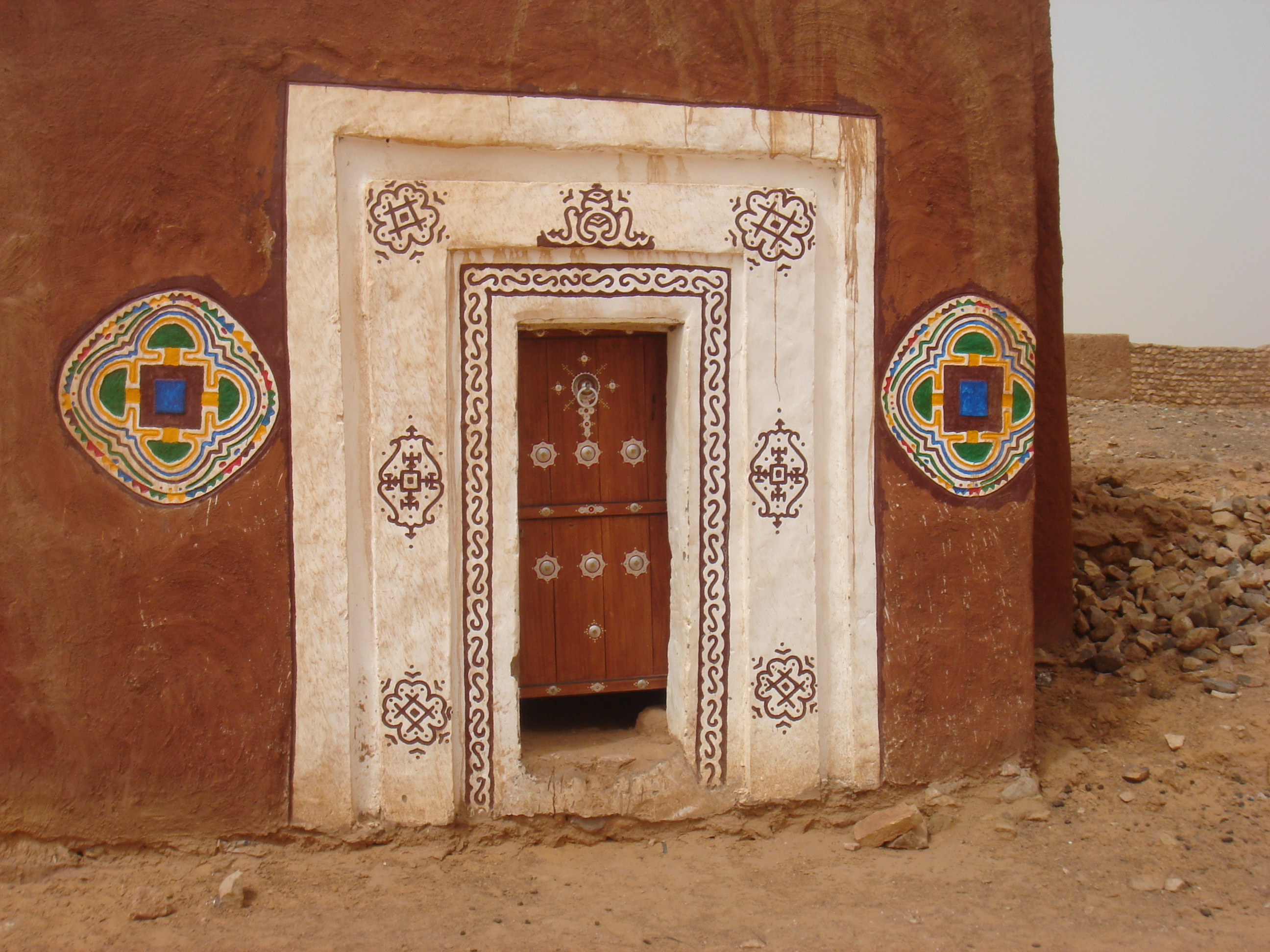
Oualata Decorative Main Entrance

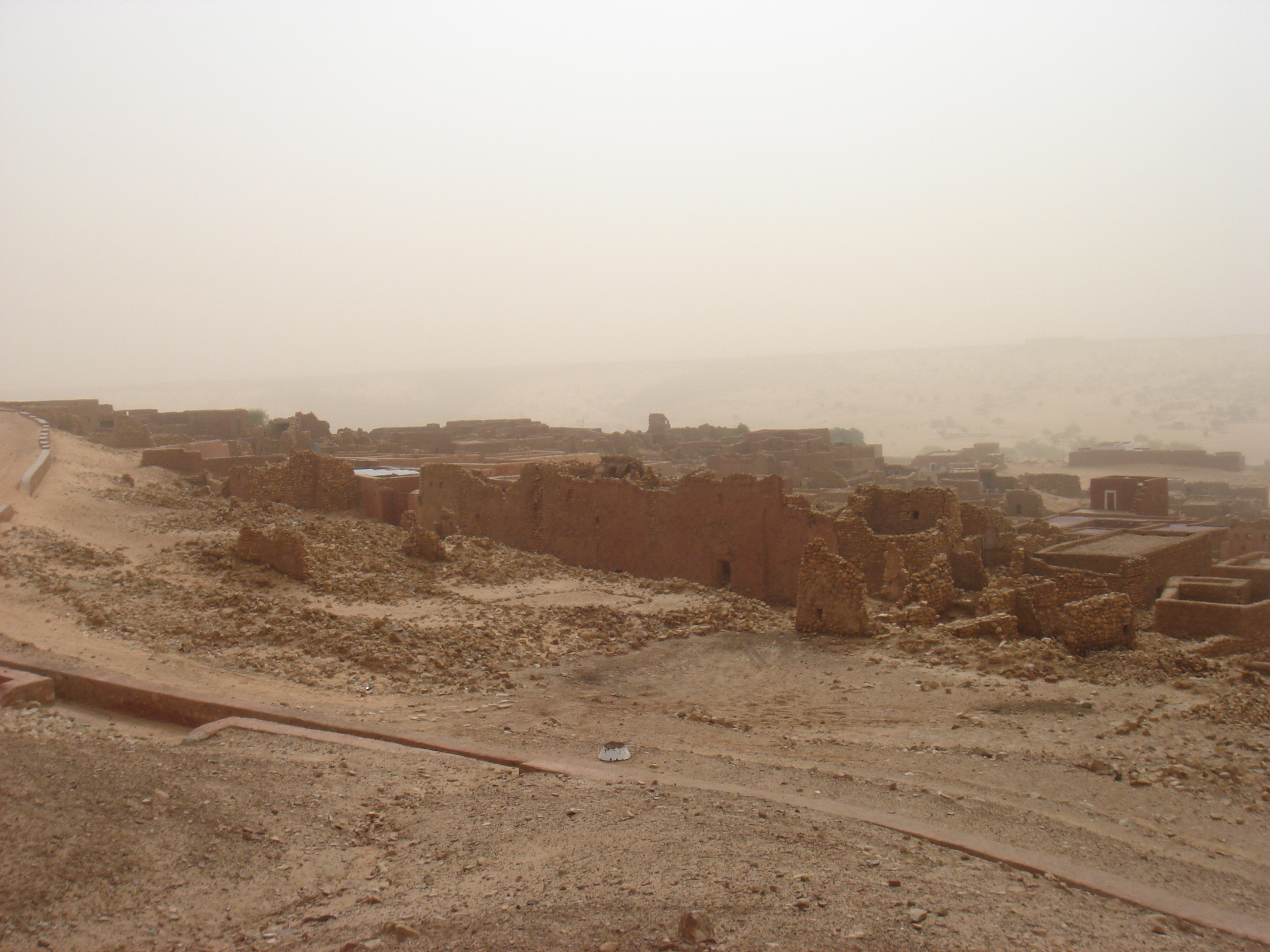
View of Oualata 1

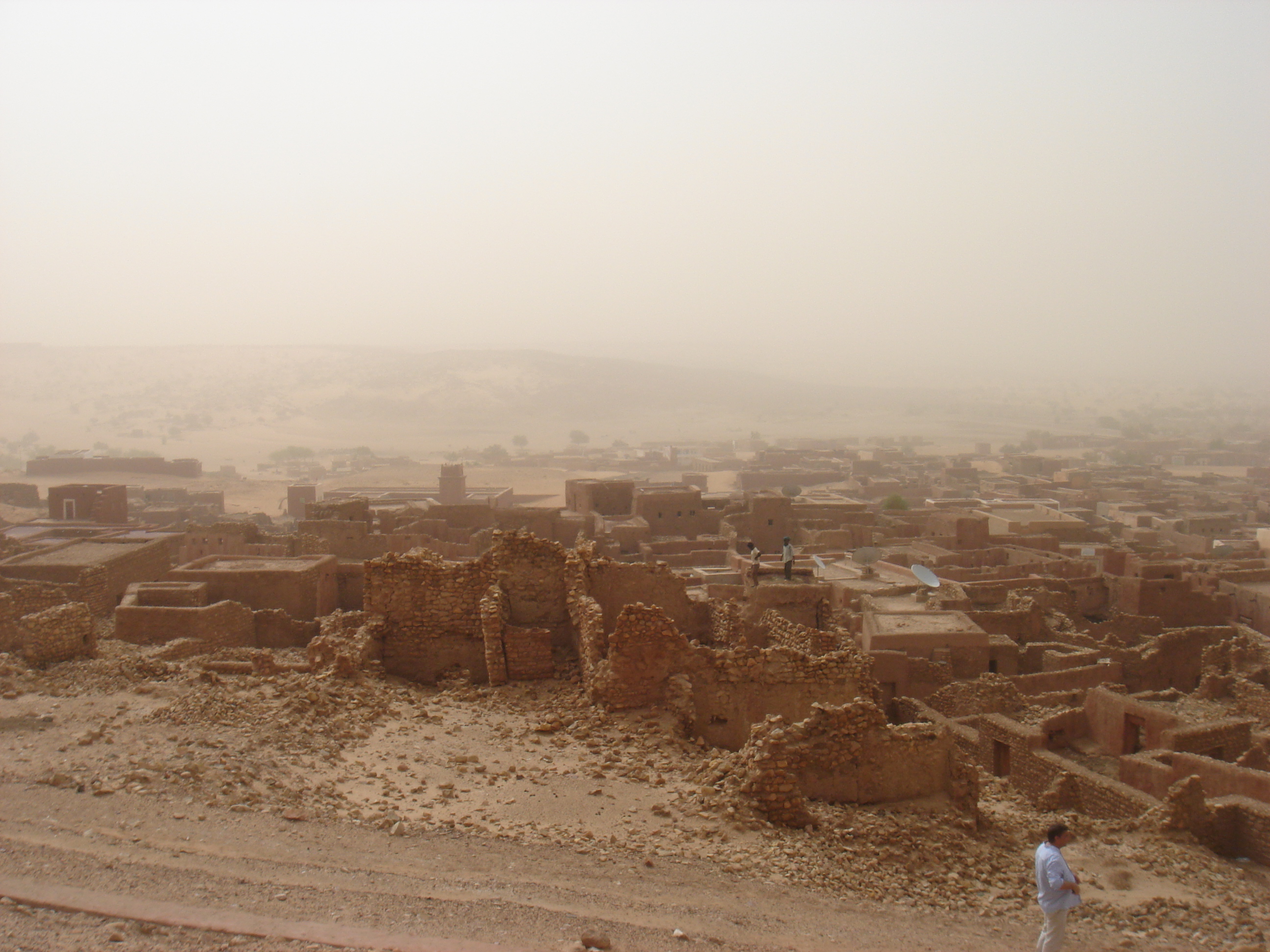
View of Oualata 2

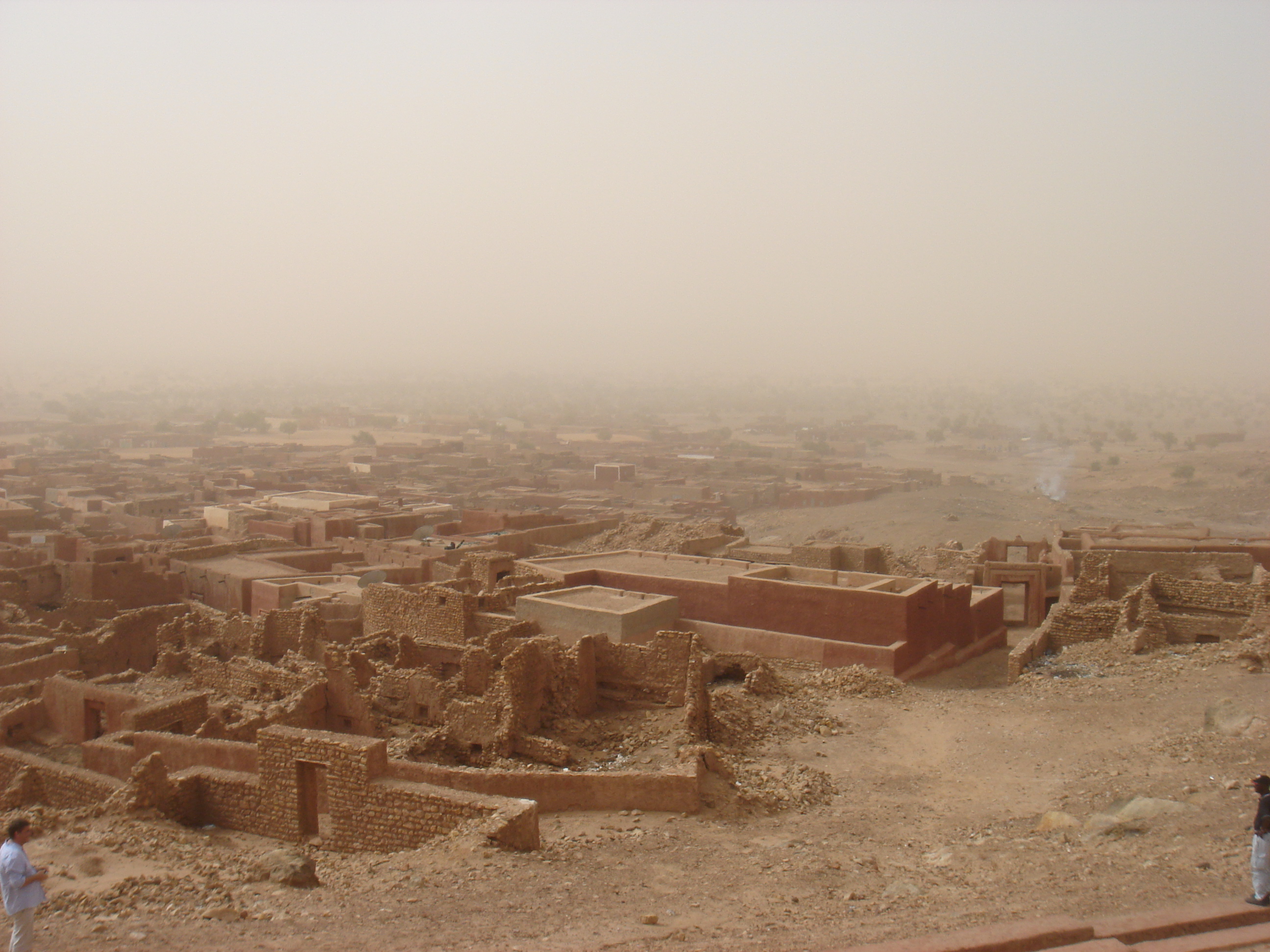
View of Oualata 3

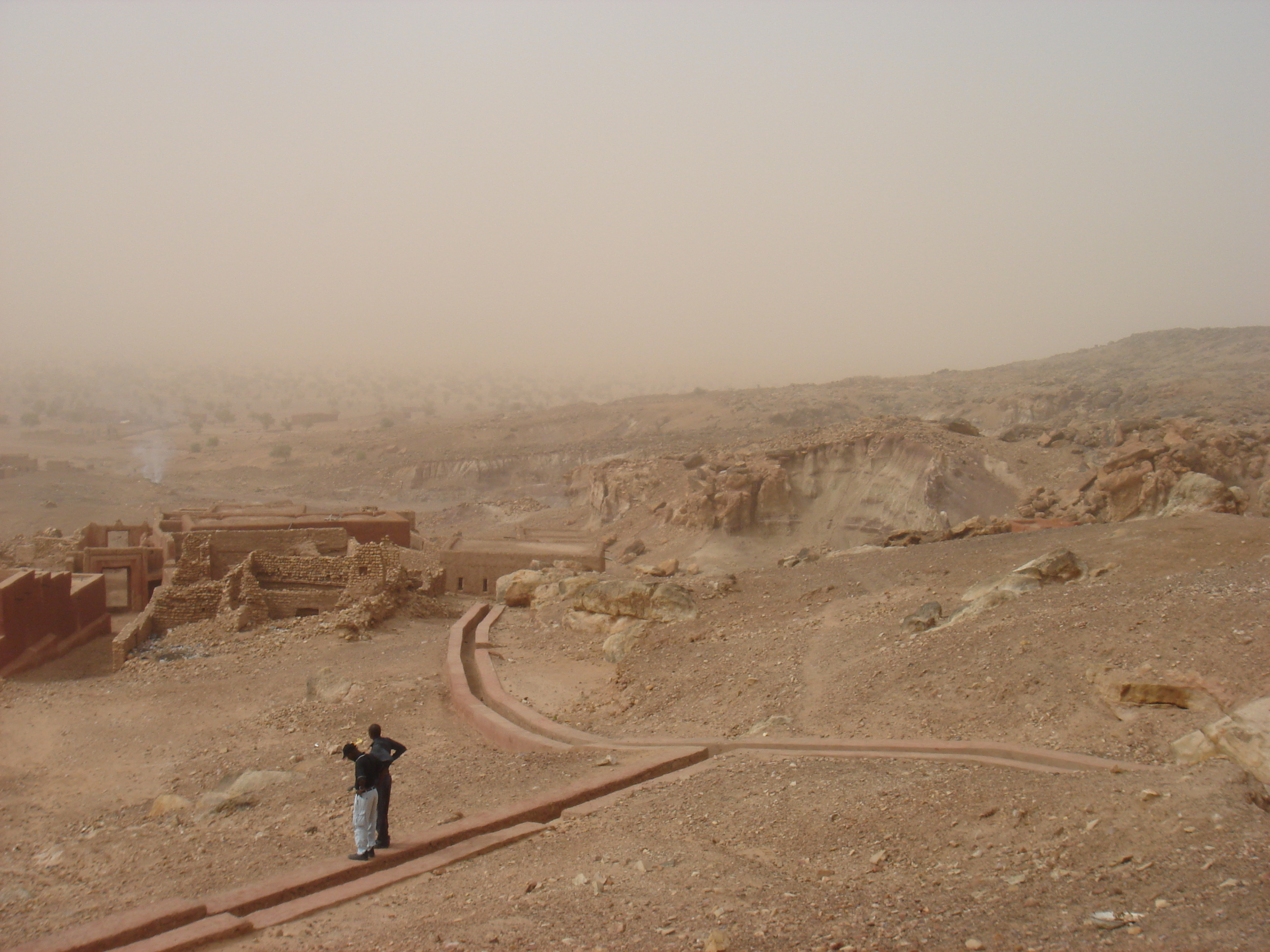
View of Oualata 4

== See also ==
- Ancient Ksour of Ouadane, Chinguetti, Tichitt and Oualata
- Twelve Doors of the Mali Empire
- En attendant les hommes, 2007 documentary film about women muralists in Oualata.
- Mauritania: Oualata, “the big sister of Timbuktu” documentary film on TV5MONDE Info, 2023

== Sources ==
- Cleaveland, Timothy (2002). Becoming Walata: A History of Saharan Social Formation and Transformation. Portsmouth, NH: Heinemann. ISBN 978-0-325-07027-8.
- Gibb, H.A.R., ed. (1929). Ibn Battuta, Travels in Asia and Africa 1325-1354. London: Routledge. ISBN 9788120608092. Extracts are available here.
- Holl, Augustin F.C. (2009). "Coping with uncertainty: Neolithic life in the Dhar Tichitt-Walata, Mauritania, (ca. 4000–2300 BP)". Comptes Rendus Geoscience. 341 (8–9): 703–712. Bibcode:2009CRGeo.341..703H. doi:10.1016/j.crte.2009.04.005.
- Hunwick, John O. (1999). Timbuktu and the Songhay Empire: Al-Sadi's Tarikh al-Sudan down to 1613 and other contemporary documents. Leiden: Brill. ISBN 90-04-11207-3.
- Levtzion, Nehemia (1973). Ancient Ghana and Mali. London: Methuen. ISBN 0-8419-0431-6.
- Mauny, Raymond (1961). Tableau géographique de l'ouest africain au moyen age, d'après les sources écrites, la tradition et l'archéologie (in French). Dakar: Institut français d'Afrique Noire.
