= Aoukar =

Coordinates: 18°00′N 9°30′W

Aoukar عوكر
- Natural region
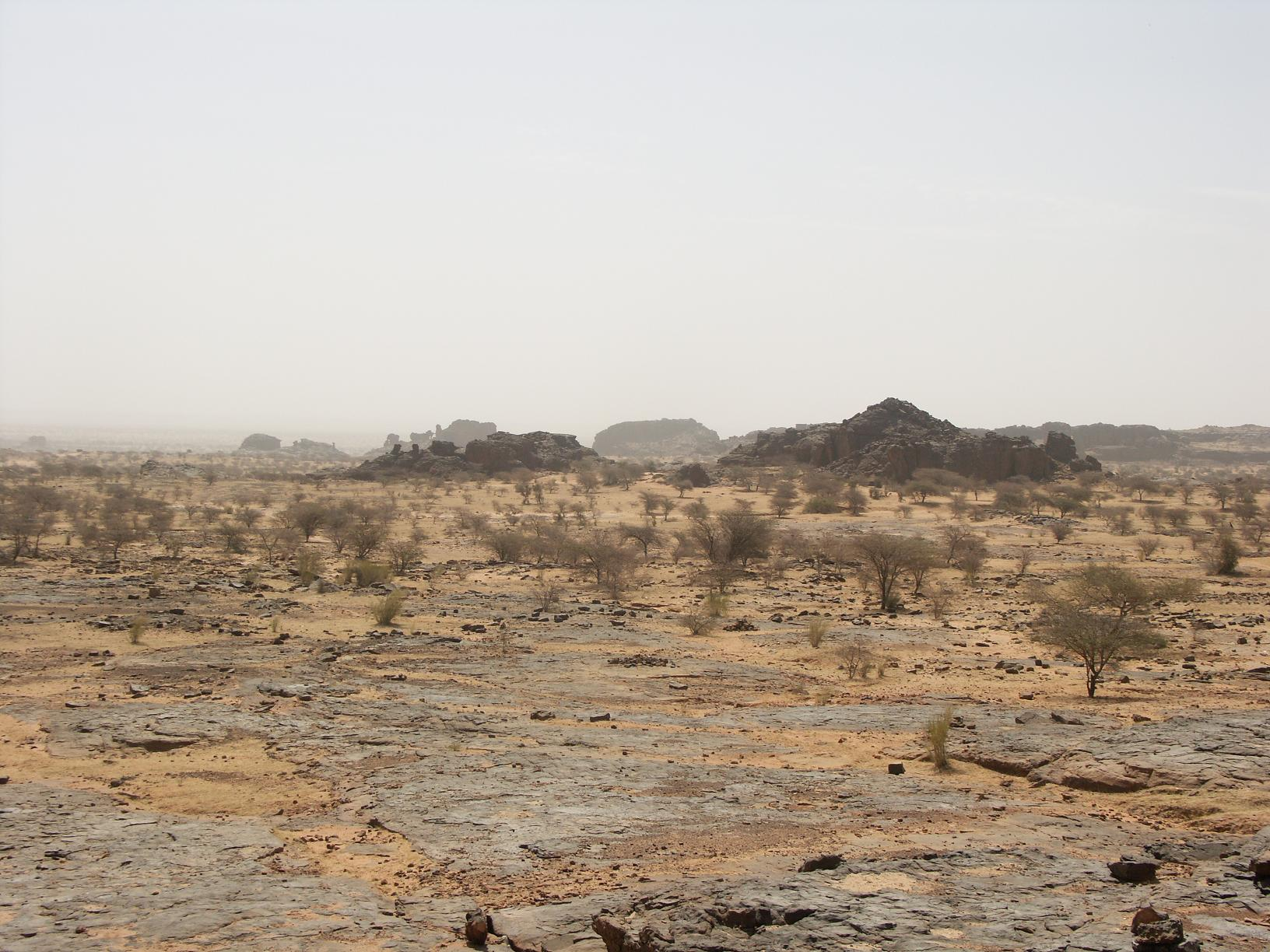
- Landscape in the Ayoun el Atrous area

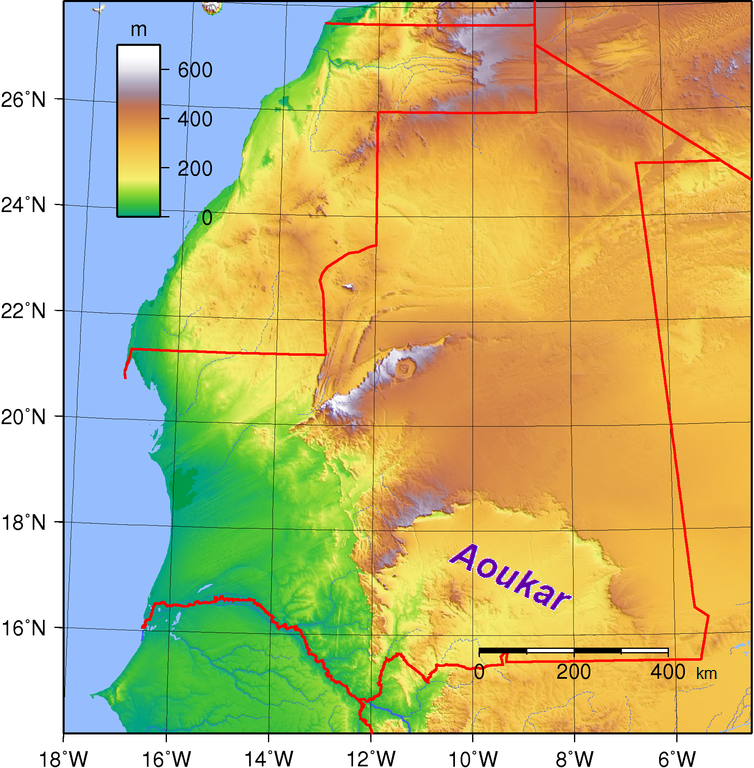
- Location of the Aoukar basin in Mauritania
- Country: Mauritania
- Elevation: 240 m (790 ft)

Aoukar or Erg Aoukar (Arabic: عوكر) is a geological depression area of south eastern Mauritania. It is located between Kiffa and Néma, south of the Tagant Plateau. The region is also referred to as Hodh or El Hodh (Note: Also encountered as Hōdh, Ḥawḍ, Hódh, and al-Hodh.) (Arabic: الحوض, lit. 'the Basin').

The Aoukar basin is a dry natural region of sand dunes and salt pans fringed by escarpments on its northern and eastern sides.

== History ==
There was once vast reed-covered endorheic lake in the area, but it no longer exists. The former lake of Aoukar extended towards the area of Tichit, bordering the southern edge of the Tagant Plateau. Below the cliffs (dhars) facing the extinct lake remains of about 400 villages have been found.

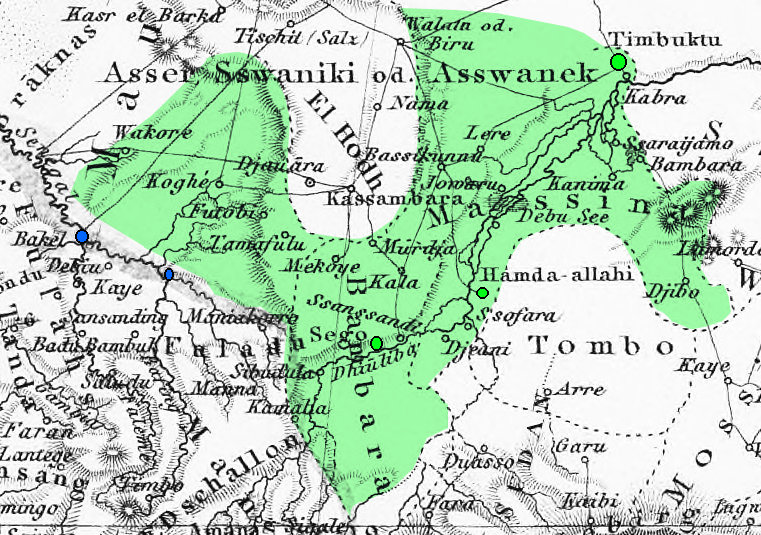
An 1861 German map displaying the unoccupied Hodh amid the Toucouleur Empire of Umar Tall.

From east to west, Dhar Néma, Dhar Walata, Dhar Tichitt, and Dhar Tagant form a semicircular shape around the Hodh/Aoukar Depression, which, prior to 4000 BCE, was an area with lakes of considerable size, and, after 1000 BCE, was an area that had become increasingly dried. During the emergence of the Tichitt Tradition, it was an oasis area. The Tichitt Tradition of eastern Mauritania dates from 2200 BCE to 200 BCE.

Previously administered as part of French Sudan (present-day Mali), the area was transferred to French Mauritania in 1944, apparently on a whim of the colonial governor Laigret. The transfer was still resented upon Mali's independence. Formerly more fertile, it is now largely a barren waste.

Aoukar/Hodh gave its name to the modern Mauritanian regions of Hodh Ech Chargui and Hodh El Gharbi.

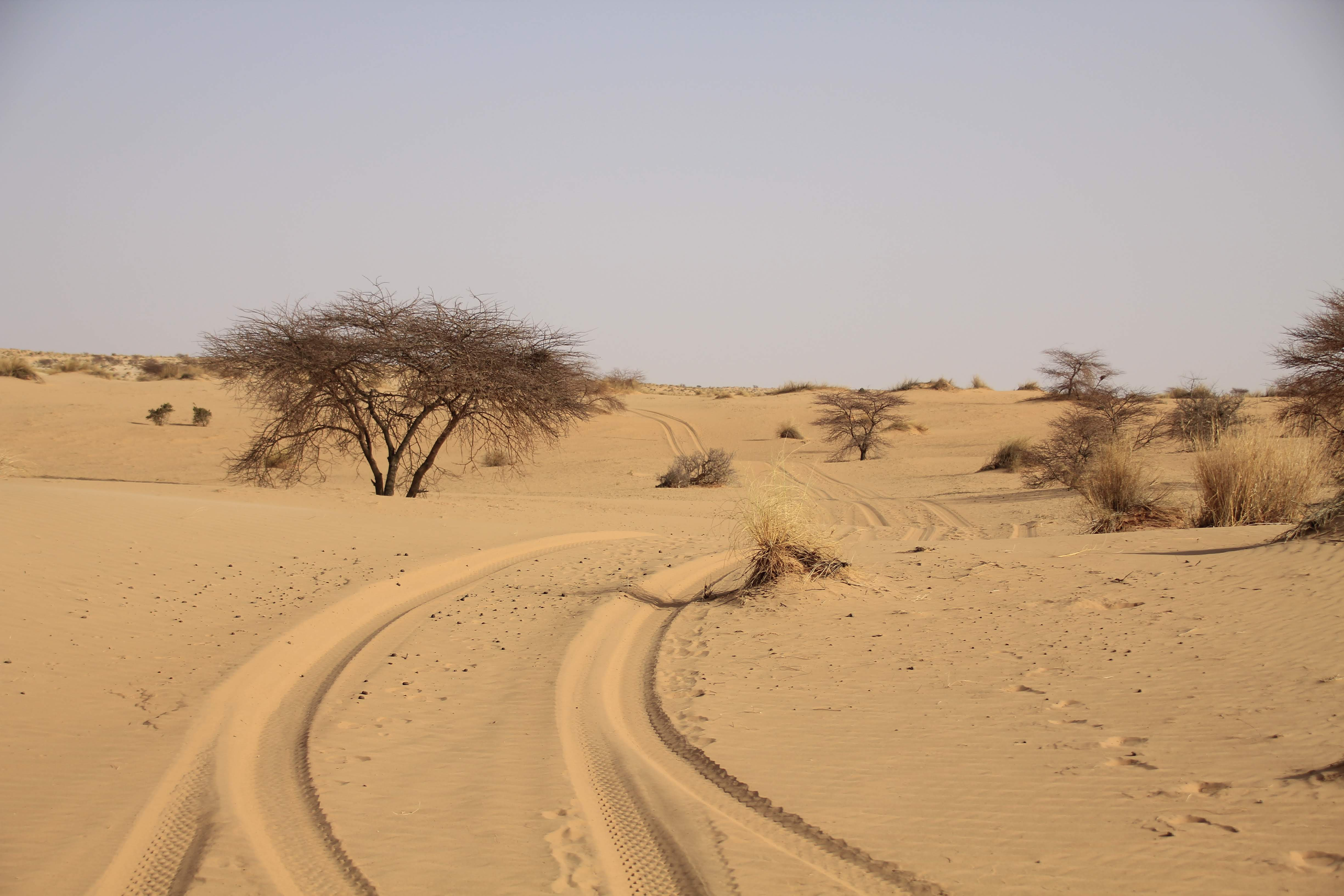
A view of the dunes in the Aoukar

== Ecology ==
The Aoukar is one of the few natural refuges for the addax, a critically endangered kind of antelope which lives in the region.

== See also ==
- Geography of Mauritania
- List of ergs
