= Chinguetti =

Chinguetti شنقيط (Arabic) City of Libraries
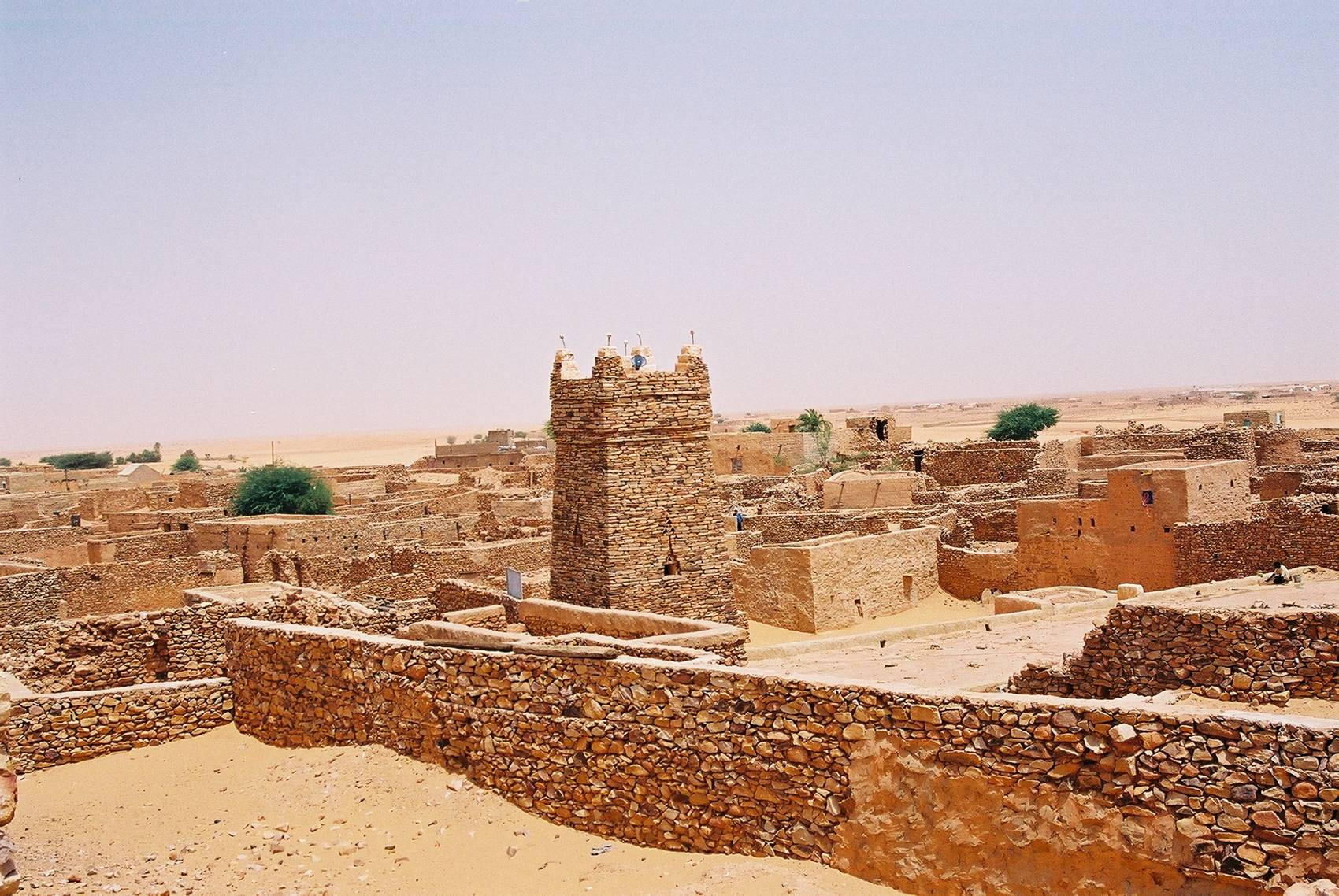
- Old town, Chinguetti

- Location in Mauritania
- Coordinates: 20°27′N 12°21′W
- Country: Mauritania
- Region: Adrar Region
- Department: Chinguetti

Area
  - City: 529.0 km^{2} (204.2 sq mi)

Population (2013 census)
  - City: 4,800
  - Urban: 3,227

UNESCO World Heritage Site
- Official name: Ancient Ksour of Ouadane, Chinguetti, Tichitt and Oualata
- Type: Cultural
- Criteria: iii, iv, v
- Designated: 1996 (20th session)
- Reference no.: 750
- Region: Arab States

Chinguetti (/ʃɪŋˈɡɛti/ shing-GHET-ee; Arabic: شنقيط, romanized: Šinqīṭ) is a ksar and a medieval trading center in northern Mauritania, located on the Adrar Plateau east of Atar. Chinguetti had a population of 4,800 as of 2013.

Founded in the 13th century as the center of several trans-Saharan trade routes, this small city continues to attract a handful of visitors who admire its spare architecture, scenery, and ancient libraries. The city is seriously threatened by the encroaching desert; high sand dunes mark the western boundary and several houses have been abandoned to the sand.

The town is split in two by a wadi. On one side, there is the old sector, and on the other the new one. The indigenous Saharan architecture of older sectors of the city features houses constructed of reddish dry-stone and mud-brick techniques, with flat roofs timbered from palms. Many of the older houses feature hand-hewn doors cut from massive ancient acacia trees, which have long disappeared from the surrounding area. Many homes include courtyards or patios that crowd along narrow streets leading to the central mosque.

== History ==
Occupied for thousands of years, the Chinguetti region was once a broad savannah; rock paintings at Agrour Amogjar, in the nearby Amogjar Pass, feature images of giraffes, cows, and people in a green landscape. It is quite different from the sand dunes of the surrounding desert, which make up most of the region today.

=== Founding ===
The city was founded in AD 777. The name Chinguetti means "spring of horses" in the Azer dialect, an extinct dialect of Soninke that was heavily mixed with Berber. The area, at that time far more green than today, was home to agricultural peoples ancestral to several sub-Saharan ethnic groups, including the Soninke.

=== Center of trade ===
By the 11th century, Chinguetti had become a trading center for a confederation of Berber tribes, known as the Sanhaja. They, alongside the much smaller Gigidigoun confederation, eventually melded with the Almoravids, represented by Abdallah ibn Yasin, who would eventually control an empire stretching from present-day Senegal to al-Andalus in modern-day Spain. The city's stark, unadorned architecture reflects the strict religious beliefs of the Almoravids, who spread the Malikite rite of Sunni Islam throughout the Western Maghreb.

After two centuries of decline, the city was effectively re-founded in the 13th century as a fortified trading-center for nomadic trans-Saharan caravans, and as a means of connecting the Mediterranean with Sub-Saharan Africa. Although the walls of the original fortification disappeared centuries ago, many of the buildings in the old section of the city date from this period.

=== World Heritage Site ===
In 1996, UNESCO designated Chinguetti, along with the cities of Ouadane, Tichitt and Oualata, also in the dunes area, as a World Heritage Site. Notable buildings in the town include The Friday Mosque of Chinguetti, a 13th-14th century Berber structure of dry-stone construction, featuring a square minaret capped with five ostrich egg finials; the former French Foreign Legion fortress; and a tall watertower. The mosque was restored by UNESCO in the 1970s. The old quarter has five important manuscript libraries of scientific and Qur'anic texts, with many dating from the later Middle Ages. In recent years, the Mauritanian government, the U.S. Peace Corps, and various NGOs have attempted to position the city as a center for adventurous tourists. Visitors may "ski" down its sand dunes, visit the libraries, and appreciate the stark beauty of the Sahara.

The Friday Mosque is widely considered by Mauritanians to be the national symbol of the country. The recently discovered offshore oilfield was named Chinguetti in its honor.

== Religious importance ==
For centuries, the city was a principal gathering place for pilgrims of the Maghreb to gather, on their way to Mecca. It became known as a holy city in its own right, especially for pilgrims unable to make the long journey to the Arab Peninsula. It also became a center of Islamic religious and scientific scholarship in West Africa. In addition to religious training, the schools of Chinguetti taught students rhetoric, law, astronomy, mathematics, and medicine. For many centuries, all of Mauritania was commonly known in the Arab world as Bilad Shinqit, "the land of Chinguetti." It is sometimes said to be the seventh-most holy city of Islam, The city remains one of the world's most important historical sites both in terms of the history of Islam and the history of West Africa.

Although largely abandoned to the desert, the city features a series of medieval manuscript libraries without peer in West Africa. The area around the Rue des Savants (or “street of intelligent ones”) was once famous as a gathering place for scholars, and as a place to debate the finer points of Islamic law. Today, the quiet city still offers the urban and religious architecture of the Moorish empire as it existed in the Middle Ages.

== Climate ==
In 2021 Chinguetti was featured in a BBC documentary Life at 50 degrees C, which looked at ordinary people living in increasingly inhospitable areas.

Climate data for Chinguetti
Month	Jan	Feb	Mar	Apr	May	Jun	Jul	Aug	Sep	Oct	Nov	Dec	Year
Mean daily maximum °C (°F)	26.0 (78.8)	28.6 (83.5)	30.9 (87.6)	33.5 (92.3)	37.1 (98.8)	40.5 (104.9)	41.3 (106.3)	40.4 (104.7)	39.0 (102.2)	36.0 (96.8)	31.1 (88.0)	26.2 (79.2)	34.2 (93.6)
Mean daily minimum °C (°F)	11.5 (52.7)	13.0 (55.4)	15.4 (59.7)	17.7 (63.9)	21.0 (69.8)	24.7 (76.5)	25.7 (78.3)	25.5 (77.9)	24.5 (76.1)	21.3 (70.3)	16.7 (62.1)	12.2 (54.0)	19.1 (66.4)
Average precipitation mm (inches)	2 (0.1)	2 (0.1)	2 (0.1)	0 (0)	1 (0.0)	2 (0.1)	6 (0.2)	18 (0.7)	18 (0.7)	7 (0.3)	4 (0.2)	2 (0.1)	64 (2.5)
Source: Climate-data.org

== Gallery ==
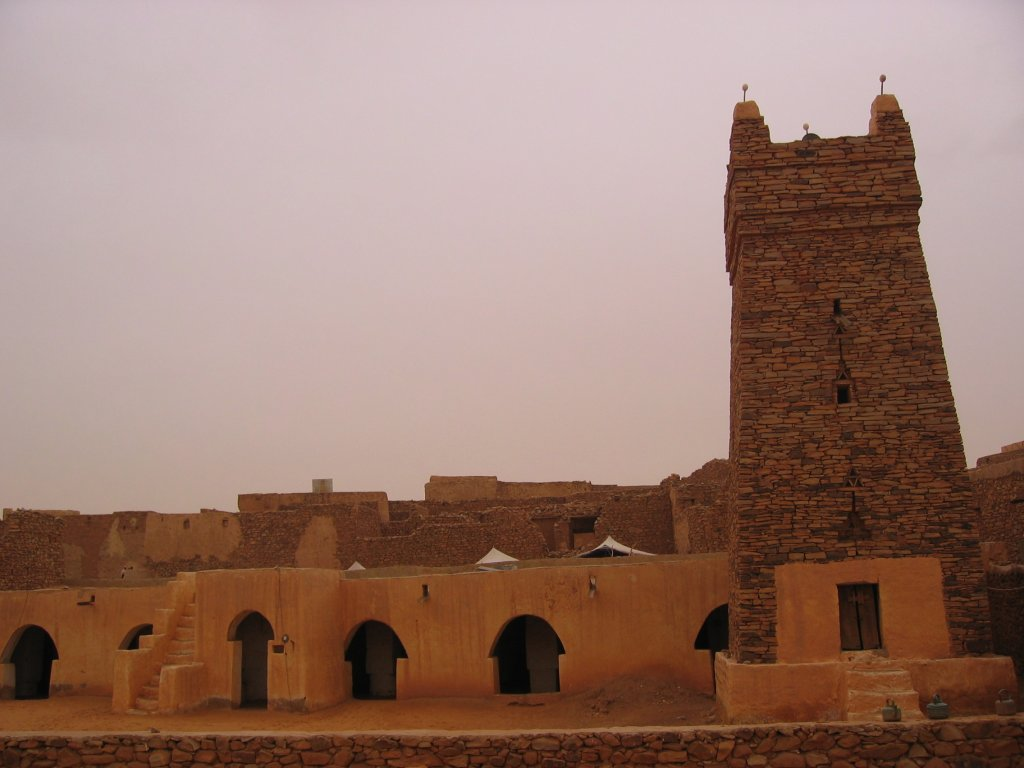
The Great "Friday Mosque"

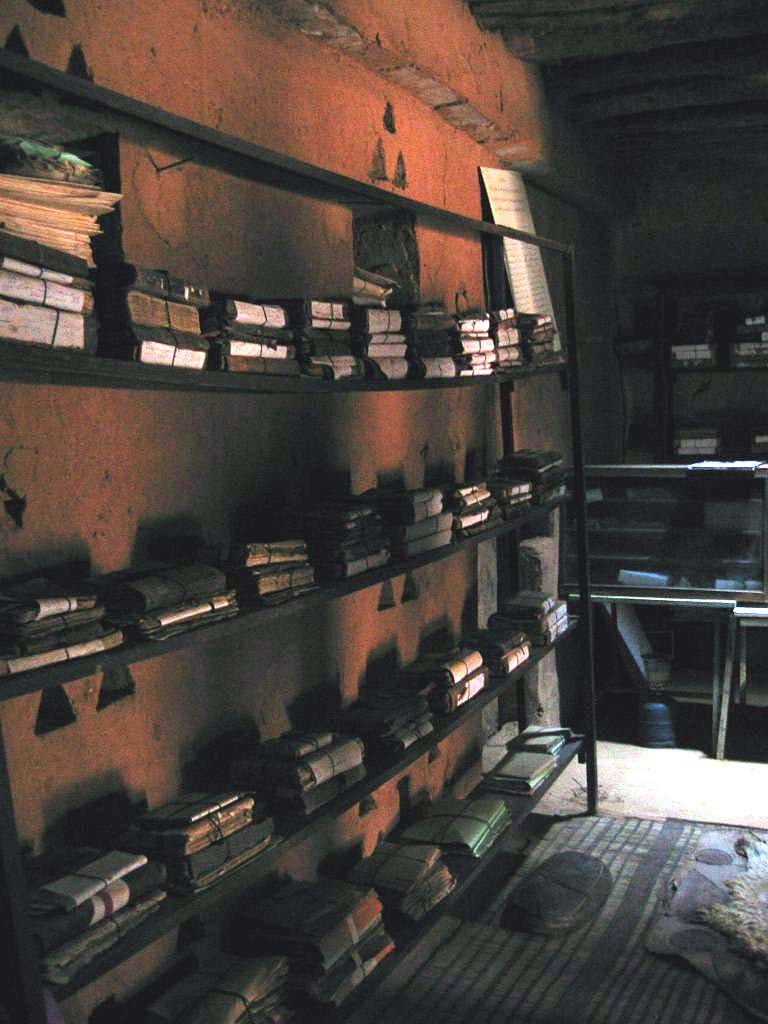
Inside a Qur'anic Library

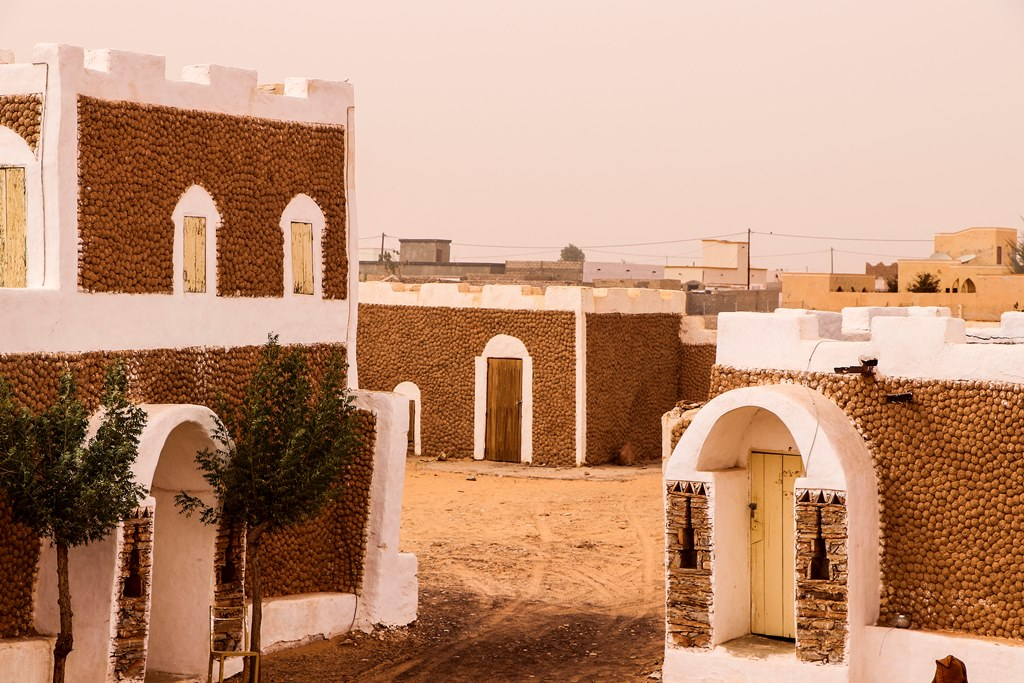
New town architecture of Chinguetti

== Notable residents ==
- Ahmad ibn al-Amin al-Shinqiti (1863–1913), who was born and lived here, is one of Mauritania's most famous writers.
- Muhammad al-Amin al-Shinqiti (1887–1973), an Islamic scholar.

== See also ==
- Ancient Ksour of Ouadane, Chinguetti, Tichitt and Oualata
- Documentary film Beyond Paper
- Chinguetti oil field, Mauritania's first offshore oil field
- Greater Mauritania, (بلاد شنقيط; Bilād Šinqīṭ; Bilad Chinguetti)
- The Chinguetti meteorite is a find reputed to come from a large unconfirmed “iron mountain”, located in the nearby of the town.
- Documentary film MAURITANIA - Ouadane to Chinguetti
- Documentary film The FORTIFIED town of Chinguetti | SLICE
