= Tichit =

- Commune and village
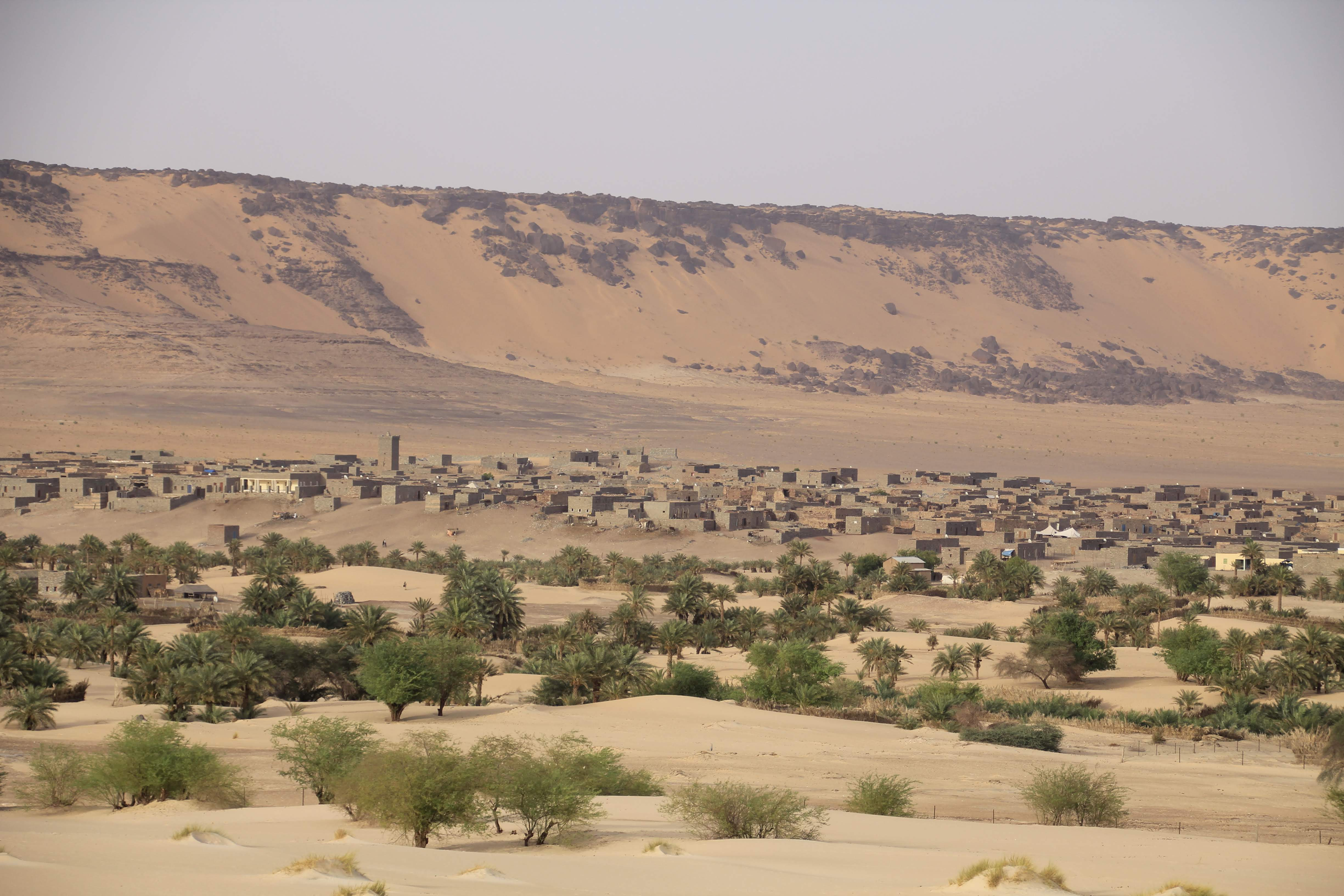
- Tichit, with Dhar Tichitt escarpment in the background

- Location in Mauritania
- Coordinates: 18°26′30″N 9°29′30″W
- Country: Mauritania
- Region: Tagant

UNESCO World Heritage Site
- Official name: Ancient Ksour of Ouadane, Chinguetti, Tichitt and Oualata
- Type: Cultural
- Criteria: iii, iv, v
- Designated: 1996 (20th session)
- Reference no.: 750
- Region: Arab States

Tichit, or Tichitt (Berber languages: Ticit, Arabic: تيشيت), is a village at the foot of the Tagant Plateau in central southern Mauritania that is known for its vernacular architecture and proximity to the Dhar Tichitt archaeological sites. The main agriculture in Tichit is date farming, and the village is also home to a small museum.

Tichitt Airport has two unpaved runways designated in a barren area 1 kilometre (0.62 mi) southeast of the village.

== History ==
=== Neolithic ===
This region includes a long sandstone cliff formation that defines the northern limit of the Hodh depression, near the former lake of Aoukar.

The Neolithic sites of Dhar Tichitt were settled around 2000 BC by agropastoral communities known as the Tichitt culture. Archaeologists including P.J. Munson, Augustin F.C. Holl, and S. Amblard have found some evidence that millet was farmed there from the date of the communities' foundation. The settlements were generally situated on the cliffs and included stone buildings. They are the oldest surviving archaeological settlements in West Africa and the oldest stone-built settlements south of the Sahara. They are thought to have been built by the proto-Soninke people and were possibly the precursor of the Ghana Empire. Hundreds of rock art images have been discovered, depicting various animals and hunting scenes. The area was abandoned around 500 BC probably because of the onset of more arid conditions.

=== Medieval ===
The area around Tichit was part of Maasina, the Fula term for the Dhar Tichitt-Walata-Néma region and origin of the name Massina for the Inner Niger Delta. Al-Bakri's 11th century chronicle records a war between 'Masin' and nearby Awgham. The oldest population strata in Tichit consists of an Afro-Berber group still called the Imasna.

The town of Tichitt was founded in the 12th century as a caravan stop on the Trans-Saharan trade route linking Oualâta to Chinguetti and eventually Sijilmasa. According to legend, seven towns have been built on top of each other at the site.

The Azer dialect of Soninke was spoken in Tichit from the era of the Wagadou Empire until the early 20th century. The name 'Tichit' may be derived from a term meaning 'language of the blacks' in the Tuareg languages.

=== Modern ===
The town was self-sufficient and boasted several thousand inhabitants in the early 20th century, but desertification and sand encroachment have led to the abandonment of many structures. In 1996, it was designated a UNESCO World Heritage Site. In 1999, torrential rains caused flooding that damaged 80% of the town.

== Vernacular Architecture ==
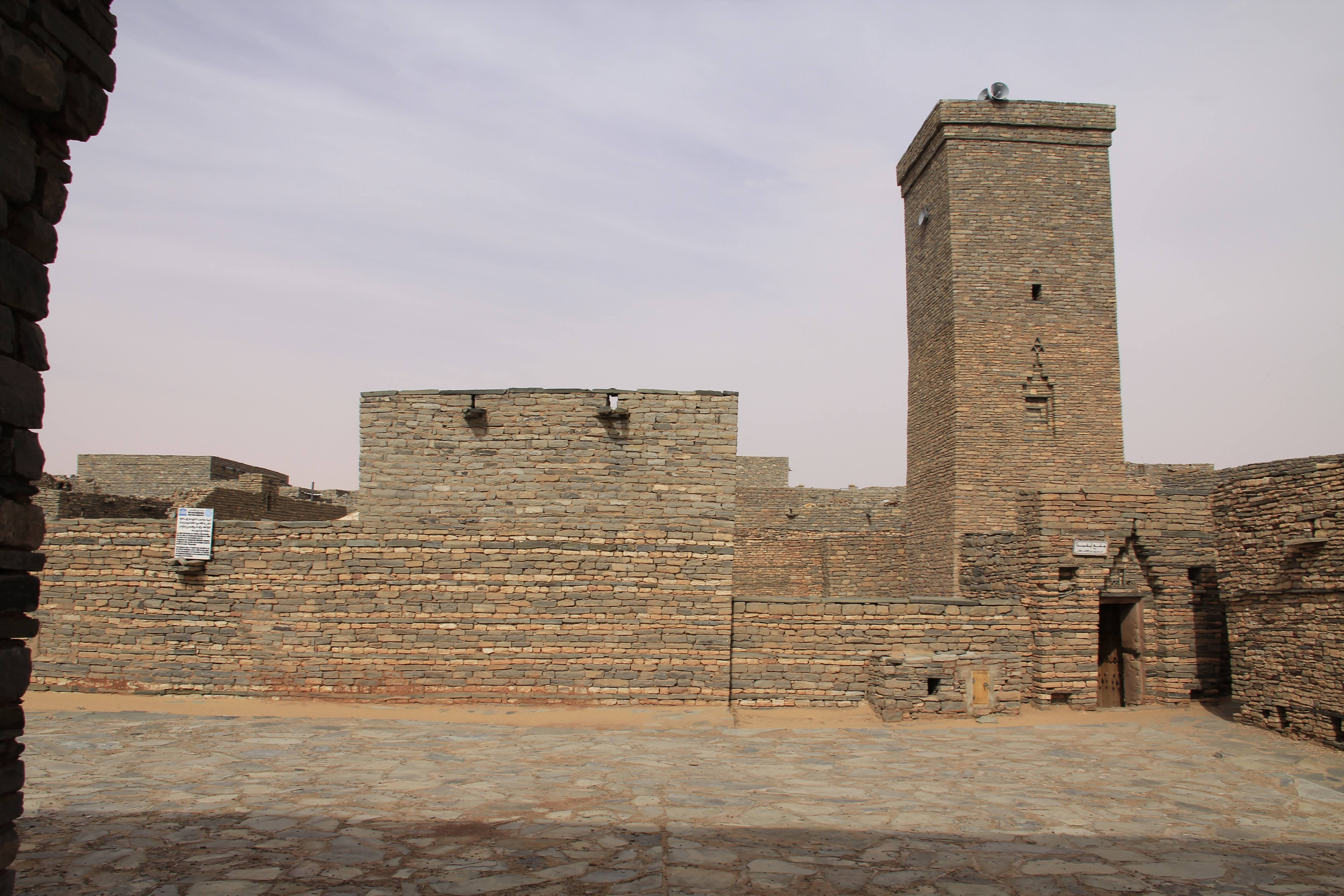
The Mosque of Tichitt

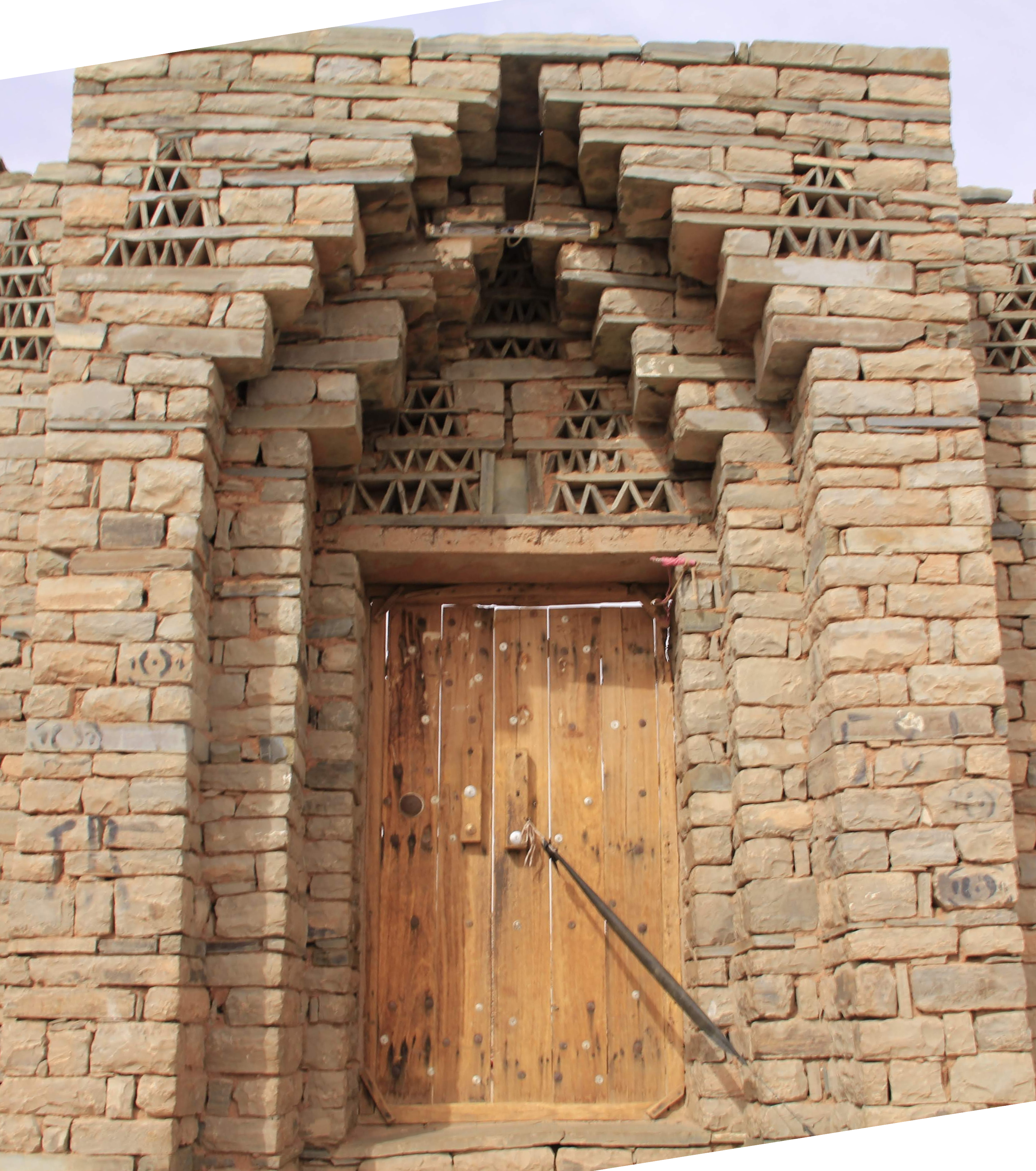
A decorated door in Tichit

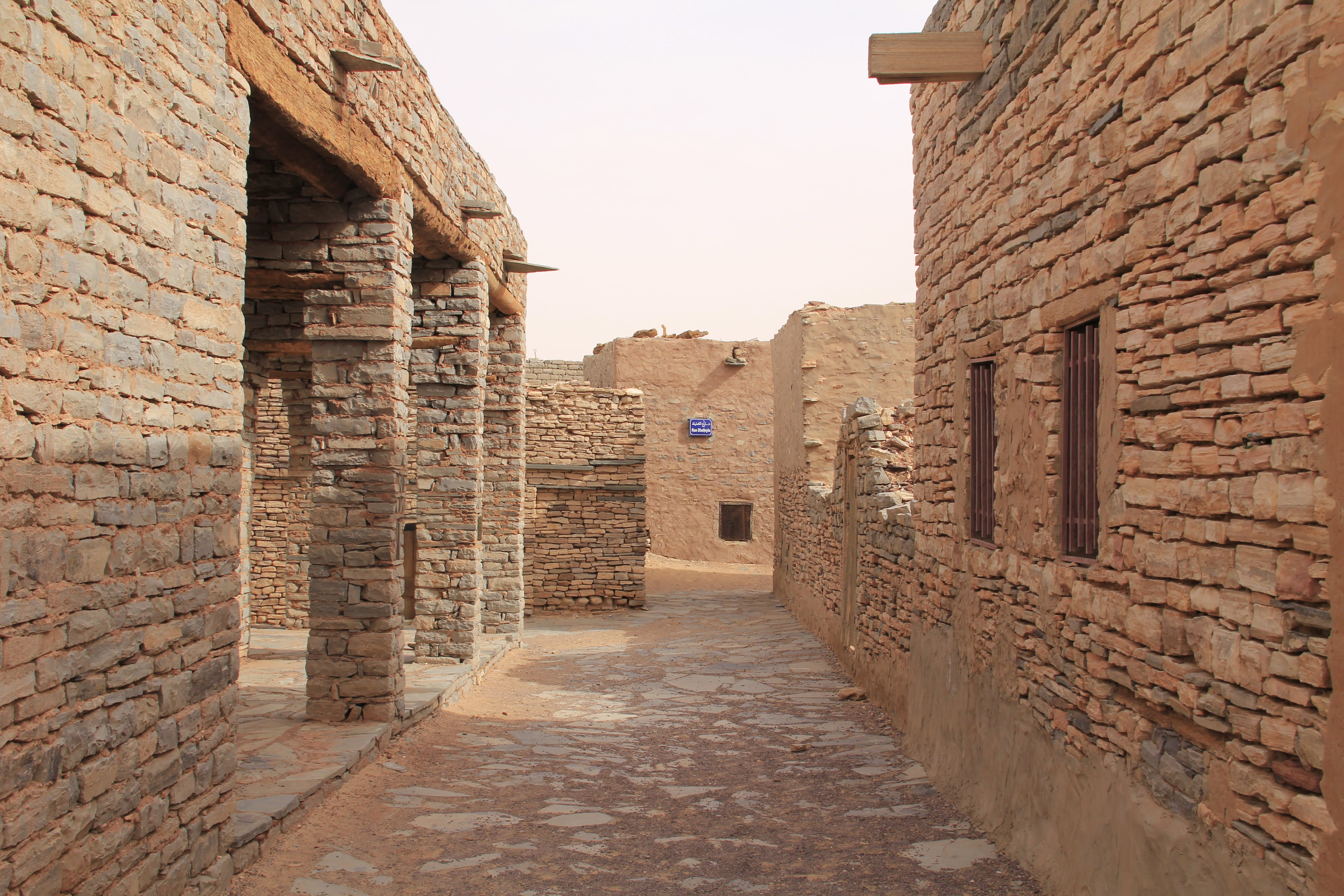
A street in Tichitt

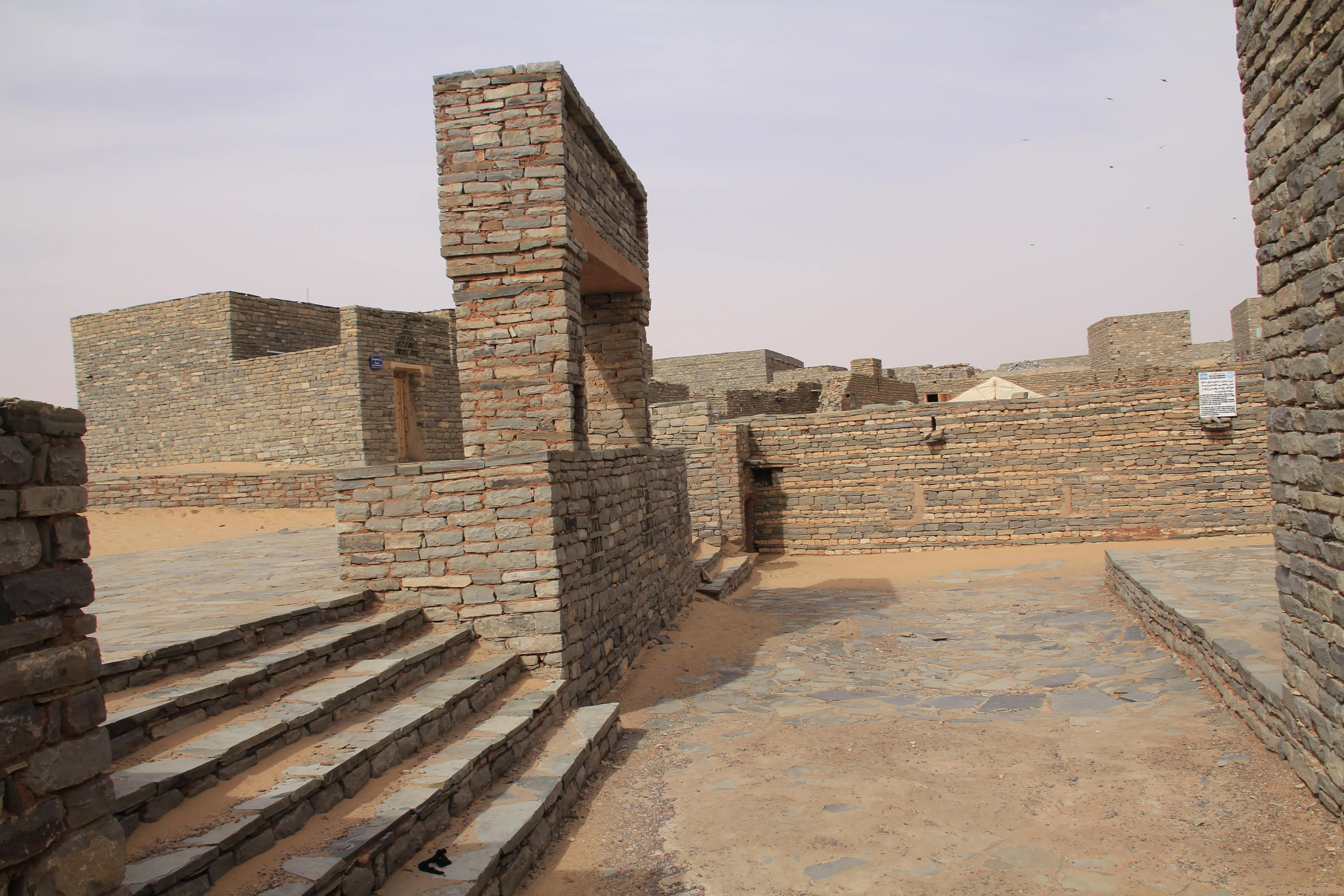
Open space

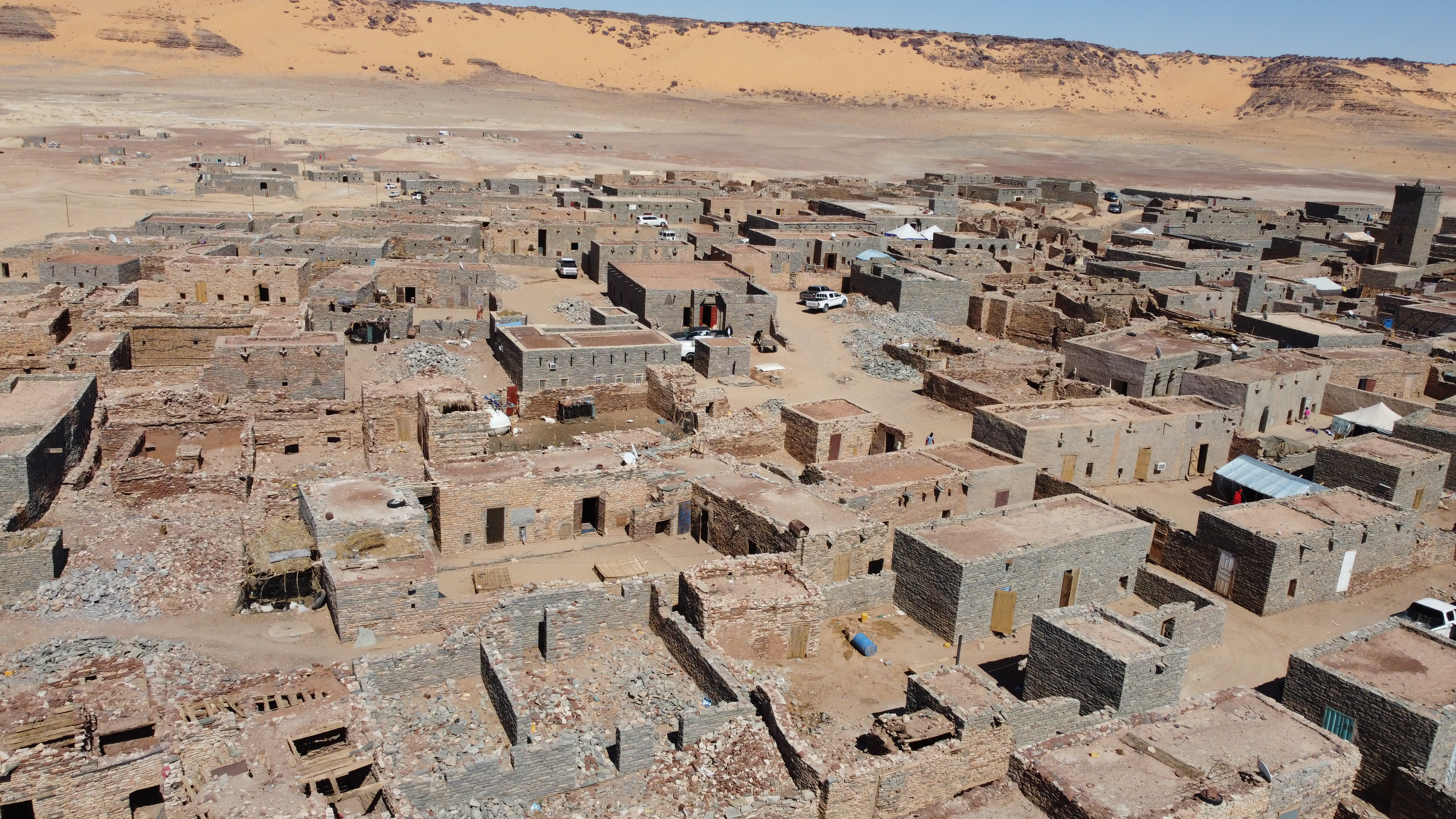
A view of the medieval town of Tichit

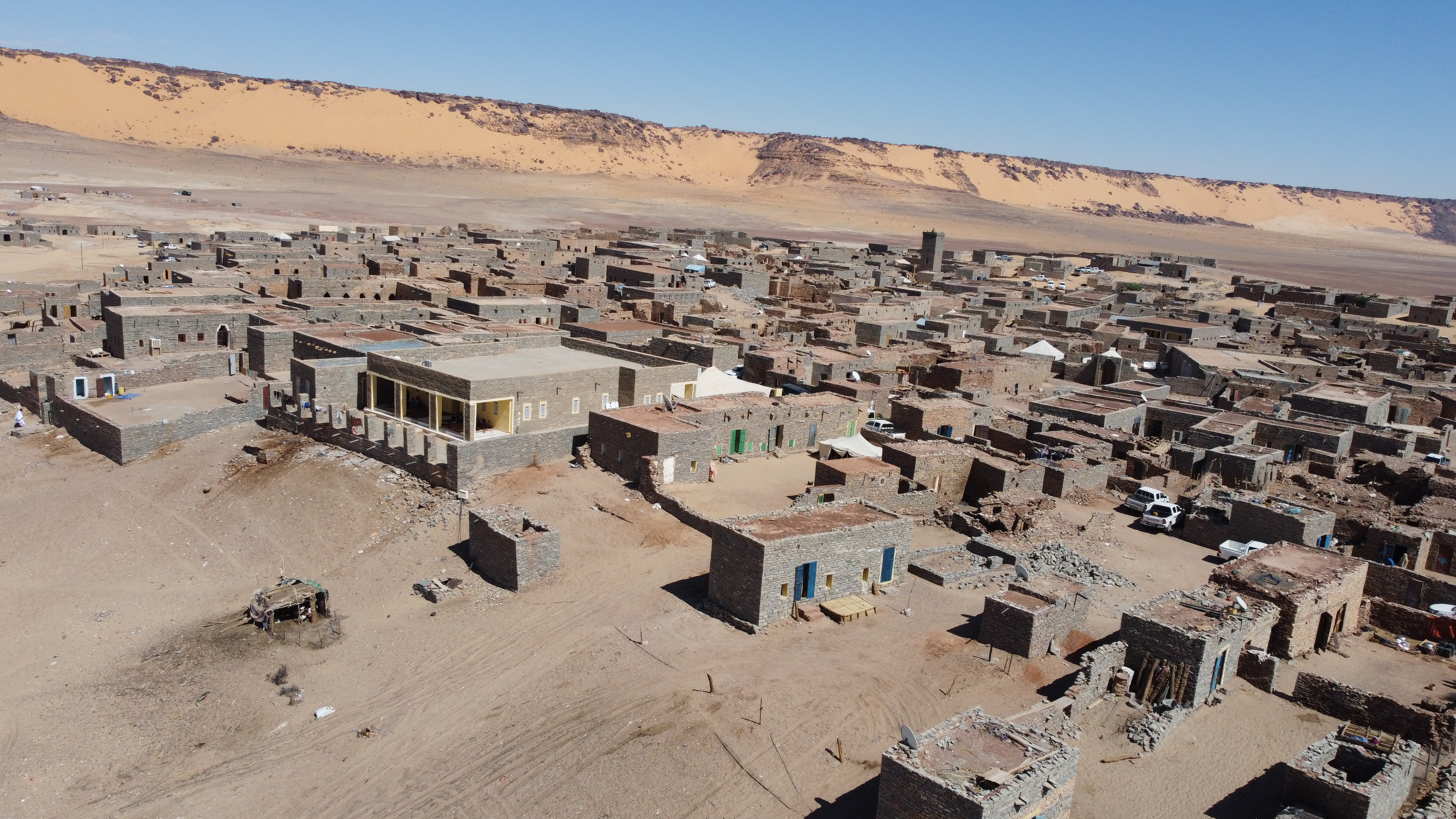
Some modern housing visible in the foreground with many other abandoned historical buildings

== Climate ==
Tichit has a hot desert climate (BWh) according to the Köppen climate classification.

Climate data for Tichit
Month	Jan	Feb	Mar	Apr	May	Jun	Jul	Aug	Sep	Oct	Nov	Dec	Year
Mean daily maximum °C (°F)	29.8 (85.6)	32.9 (91.2)	37.5 (99.5)	40.4 (104.7)	42.5 (108.5)	42.0 (107.6)	38.6 (101.5)	35.8 (96.4)	37.5 (99.5)	38.7 (101.7)	35.3 (95.5)	31.6 (88.9)	36.9 (98.4)
Mean daily minimum °C (°F)	16.2 (61.2)	19.2 (66.6)	23.8 (74.8)	26.9 (80.4)	29.9 (85.8)	30.5 (86.9)	28.2 (82.8)	26.6 (79.9)	27.0 (80.6)	27.0 (80.6)	22.2 (72.0)	18.1 (64.6)	24.6 (76.4)
Average precipitation mm (inches)	0 (0)	1 (0.0)	0 (0)	1 (0.0)	1 (0.0)	6 (0.2)	15 (0.6)	32 (1.3)	19 (0.7)	3 (0.1)	1 (0.0)	0 (0)	79 (2.9)
Source 1: http://www.storm247.com/weather/110676228/climate (temperature)
Source 2: http://www.levoyageur.net/weather-city-TICHITT.html (precipitation)

== See also ==
- Ancient Ksour of Ouadane, Chinguetti, Tichitt and Oualata

== Bibliography ==
- Holl, Augustin F.C. (2002), "Time, space, and image making: rock art from the Dhar Tichitt (Mauritania)" (PDF), African Archaeological Review, 19 (2): 75–118, doi:10.1023/A:1015479826570, hdl:2027.42/43991, JSTOR 25130740, S2CID 54741966.
- Holl, Augustin F.C. (2009), "Coping with uncertainty: Neolithic life in the Dhar Tichitt-Walata, Mauritania, (ca. 4000–2300 BP)", Comptes Rendus Geoscience, 341 (8–9): 703–712, doi:10.1016/j.crte.2009.04.005.
- Munson, Patrick J. (1980), "Archaeology and the prehistoric origins of the Ghana Empire", Journal of African History, 21 (4): 457–466, doi:10.1017/s0021853700018685, JSTOR 182004, S2CID 161981607.
