= Ancient Ksour of Ouadane, Chinguetti, Tichitt and Oualata =

UNESCO World Heritage Site
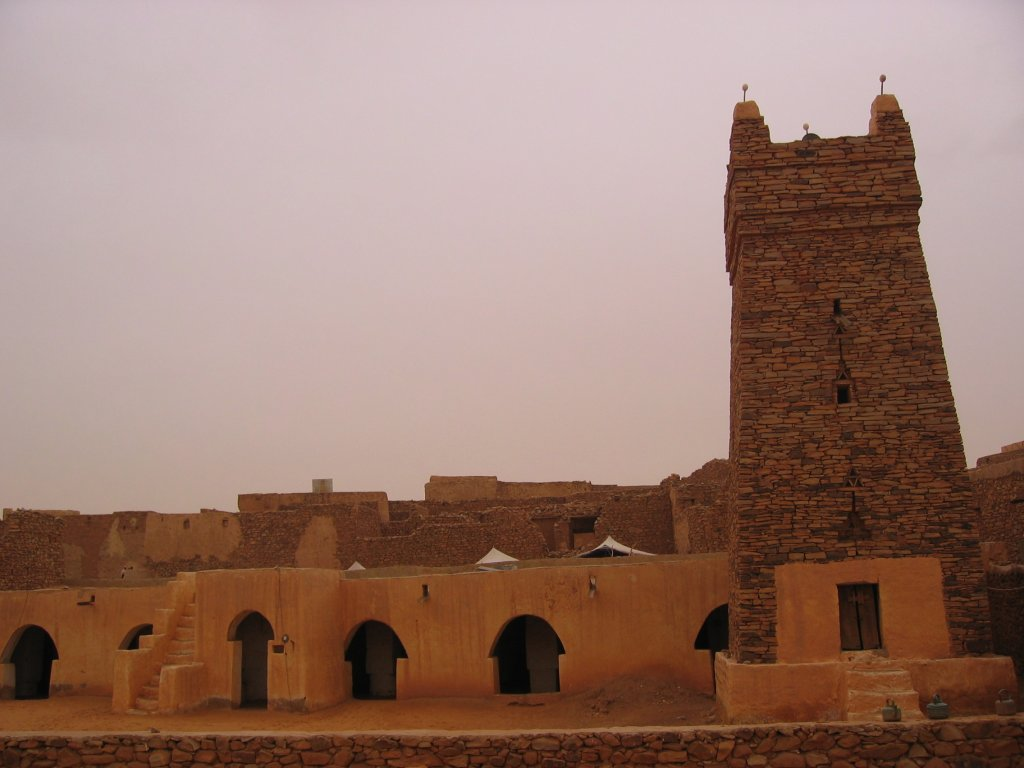

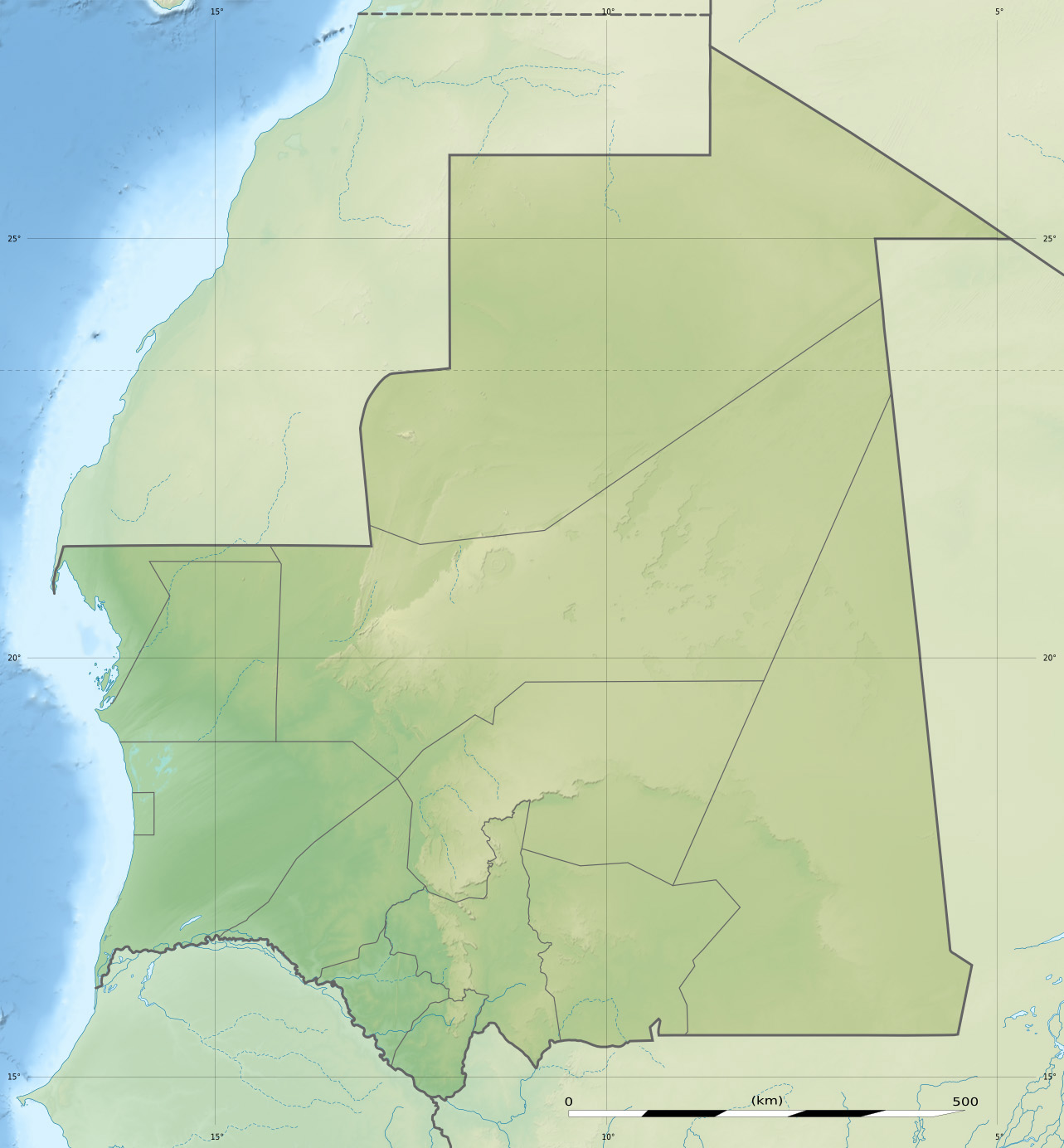
- Location within Mauritania
- Location: Mauritania
- Criteria: Cultural: iii, iv, v
- Reference: 750
- Inscription: 1996 (20th Session)
- Area: 54.7 ha (135 acres)

The ancient ksour of Ouadane, Chinguetti, Tichitt and Oualata in Mauritania were inscribed on the UNESCO World Heritage List in 1996.

Ouadane and Chinguetti are located in the Adrar Region, Tichitt in the Tagant Region and Oualata in the Hodh Ech Chargui Region. These cities were founded around the 11th century as stopping places for the caravans of the Trans-Saharan trade crossing the Sahara.

Once prosperous centres of Saharan culture, these cities survive today with many difficulties, not only due to the radical transformation of the trade routes, but above all because of the advancing sands of the desert.

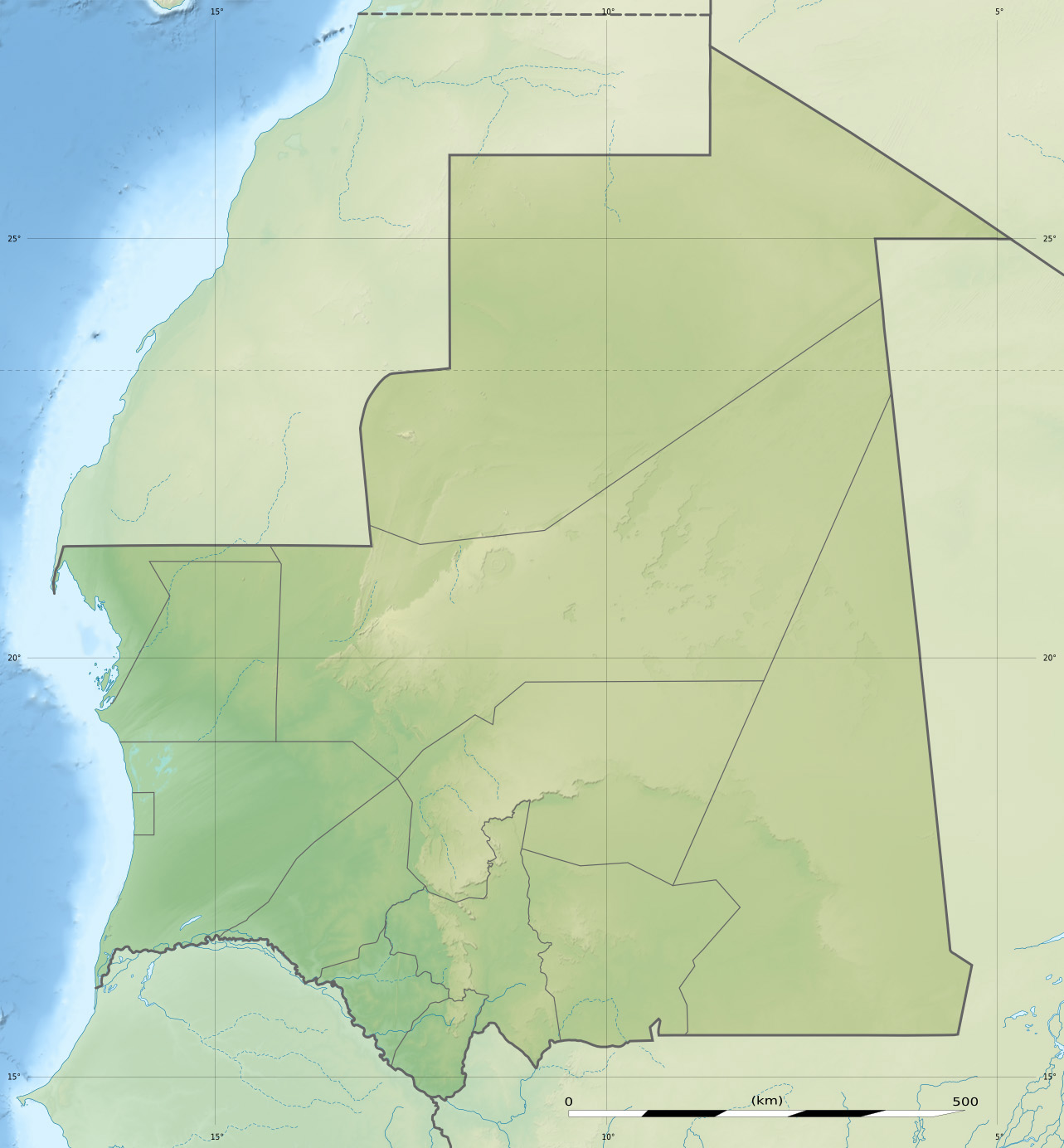
Locations of Ancient Ksours of Ouadane, Chinguetti, Tichitt and Oualata
