= List of impact structures in Australia =

World map in equirectangular projection of the impact structures on the Earth Impact Database as of November 2017 (in the SVG file, hover over a structure to show its details)

This list includes all 27 confirmed impact structures in Australia as listed in the Earth Impact Database.

== Impact structures - confirmed ==
Locations of confirmed impact craters in Australia, maximum ages:
Cenozoic
Mesozoic
Paleozoic
Precambrian

Name	State	Diameter (km)	Age (years)	Coordinates
Acraman	South Australia	90	about 590 million	32°1′S 135°27′E
Amelia Creek	Northern Territory	20	1660 - 600 million	20°55′S 134°50′E
Boxhole	Northern Territory	0.17	5,400 ± 1,500	22°37′S 135°12′E
Connolly Basin	Western Australia	9	< 60 million	23°32′S 124°45′E
Crawford	South Australia	8.5	> 35 million	34°43′S 139°2′E
Dalgaranga	Western Australia	0.02	about 3000	27°38′S 117°17′E
Flaxman	South Australia	10	> 35 million	34°37′S 139°4′E
Foelsche	Northern Territory	6	> 545 million	16°40′S 136°47′E
Glikson	Western Australia	19	< 508 million	23°59′S 121°34′E
Goat Paddock	Western Australia	5	< 50 million	18°20′S 126°40′E
Gosses Bluff	Northern Territory	22	142.5 ± 0.8 million	23°49′S 132°19′E
Goyder	Northern Territory	3	< 1.4 billion	13°9′S 135°2′E
Henbury	Northern Territory	0.16	4200 ± 1900	24°34′S 133°09′E
Kelly West	Northern Territory	10	> 550 million	19°56′S 133°57′E
Lawn Hill	Queensland	18	> 515 million	18°40′S 138°39′E
Liverpool	Northern Territory	1.6	1000 - 543 million	12°24′S 134°3′E
Matt Wilson	Northern Territory	7.5	< 1402 ± 440 million	15°30′4″S 131°10′43″E
Mount Toondina	South Australia	4	< 110 million	27°57′S 135°22′E
Piccaninny	Western Australia	7	< 360 million	17°26′S 128°26′E
Shoemaker (formerly Teague)	Western Australia	30	Proterozoic	25°52′S 120°53′E
Spider	Western Australia	13	> 570 million	16°44′S 126°5′E
Strangways	Northern Territory	25	646 ± 42 million	15°12′S 133°35′E
Tookoonooka	Queensland	55	128 ± 5 million	27°7′S 142°50′E
Veevers	Western Australia	0.08	< 20 thousand	22°58′S 125°22′E
Wolfe Creek	Western Australia	0.87	120,000	19°10′S 127°48′E
Woodleigh	Western Australia	60–120	364 ± 8 million	26°3′S 114°40′E
Yarrabubba	Western Australia	70	> 2 billion	27°10′S 118°50′E
Ora Banda	Western Australia	5	100 million	30°38′S 121°06′E
Hickman Crater	Newman, Western Australia	0.27	10 - 100 thousand	23°2′13.4″S 119°40′59.3″E
Yallalie Impact Structure	Dandaragan, Western Australia	12	80-90 Million	30°27′05″S 115°46′57″E

== Unconfirmed impact structures ==
The following structures are officially considered "unconfirmed" because they are not listed in the Earth Impact Database. Due to stringent requirements regarding evidence and peer-reviewed publication, newly discovered craters or those with difficulty collecting evidence generally are known for some time before becoming listed. However, entries on the unconfirmed list could still have an impact origin disproven.

Name	State	Diameter (km)	Age	Coordinates
Bedout	Indian Ocean, Western Australia	200	250 million	18°S 119°E
Darwin Crater	Tasmania	1.2	800 thousand	42°19′S 145°40′E
Deniliquin multiple-ring feature	Southeast Australia	520	445-444 million, Hirnantian mass extinction event	35°32′0″S 144°58′0″E
Diamantina River ring feature	Upper Diamantina River, Queensland	130	300 million	22.15°S 141.9°E
East Warburton Basin	South Australia	200	about 300-360 million	27°0′S 140°5′E
West Warburton Basin	South Australia	200	about 300-360 million	
Gnargoo	Carnarvon Basin, Western Australia	75	<300	24°48′24″S 115°13′29″E
North Pole Crater	Pilbara Craton, Western Australia	100	3.47 billion	21°02′54″S 119°23′35″E

== See also ==
- Impact craters
- Impact events
- Bolides and Meteorites
- Earth Impact Database – primary source
- Traces of Catastrophe book from Lunar and Planetary Institute - comprehensive reference on impact crater science
