= Strangways crater =

Impact crater of Northern Territory

Strangways Crater
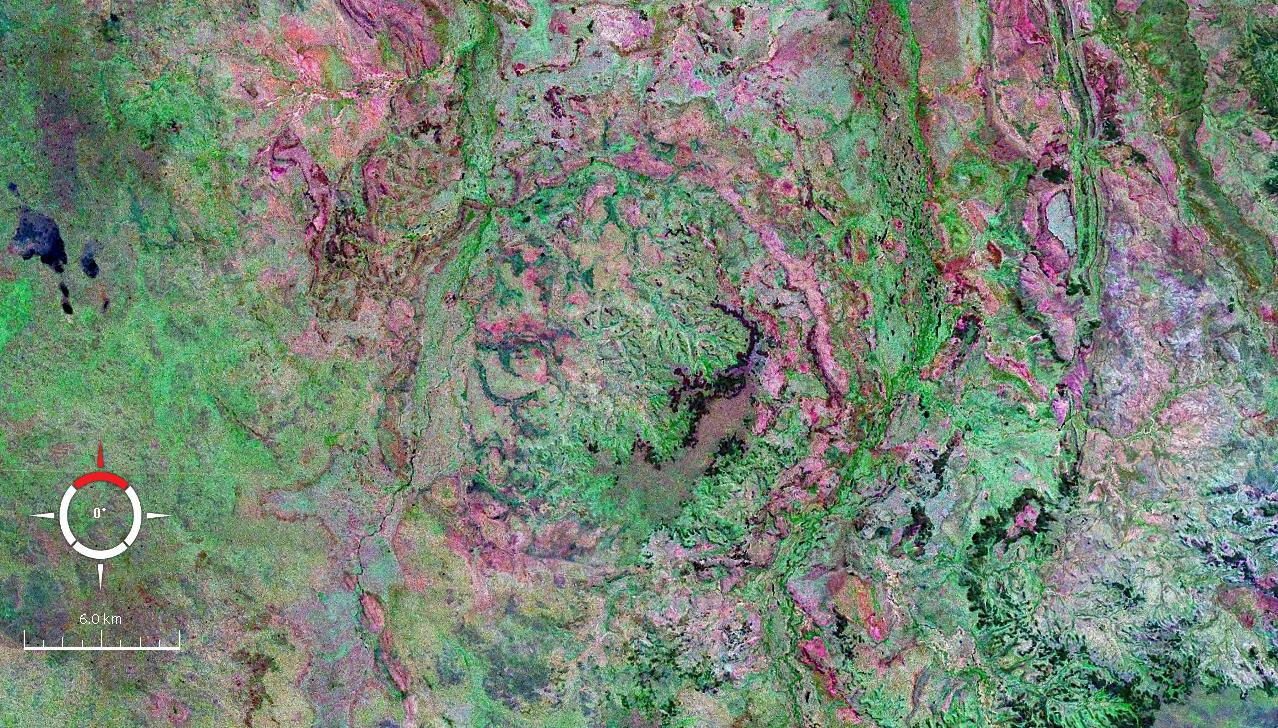
- Landsat image of Strangways crater

- Location within Northern Territory
- Location: Northern Territory, Australia; 15°12′S 133°35′E

Impact crater structure
- Confidence: Confirmed
- Diameter: c. 30 km
- Age: c. 646 million years
- Exposed: Yes
- Drilled: No
- Bolide type: Achondrite

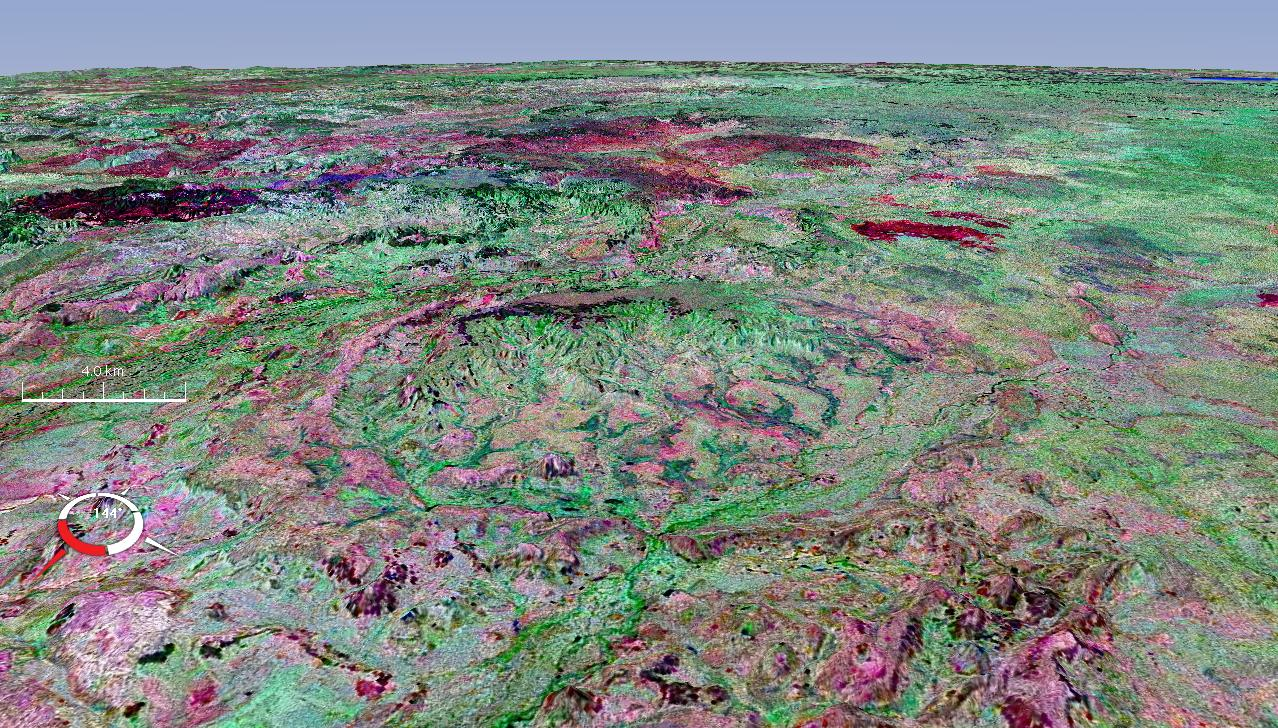
Oblique false colour Landsat image draped over digital elevation model (x10 vertical exaggeration), Strangways crater; screen capture from NASA World Wind

Strangways Crater is a large impact structure, the eroded remnant of a former impact crater, located in the Northern Territory of Australia about 65 kilometres (40 mi) east-south-east of the town of Mataranka. It was named after the nearby Strangways River. The location is remote and difficult to access. The impact occurred around 646 million years ago.

== Description ==
The circular topographic feature that marks the site was originally thought to be volcanic, with an impact origin first proposed in 1971 after the discovery of evidence diagnostic of impact including shatter cones and shocked quartz. The circular topographic feature is around 16 km (9.9 mi) in diameter and lies within Mesoproterozoic sedimentary rocks of the McArthur Basin. However, this is only a relic of the original crater after considerable erosion. Estimates of the original rim diameter vary between different researchers in the range 24–40 km (15–25 mi); the Earth Impact Database prefers a diameter of 25 km (16 mi). The age of the impact event has been determined at 646 ± 42 Mya (Neoproterozoic) based on radiometric dating of impact melt rocks.

In 1996, the crater's site was listed on the now-defunct Register of the National Estate.

== See also ==
- List of impact craters in Australia
