= Foelsche crater =

Impact crater in Northern Territory, Australia

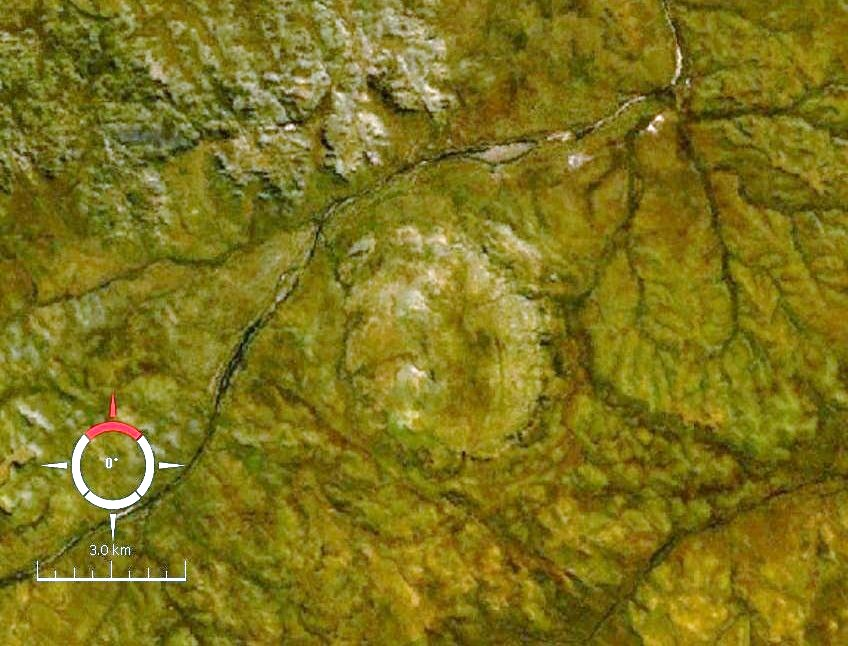
- Landsat image of the Foelsche crater (beneath circular hill in centre); screen capture from NASA World Wind

- Location within Northern Territory
- Location: Northern Territory, Australia; 16.67°S 136.78°E

Impact crater structure
- Confidence: Confirmed
- Diameter: 6 km (3.7 mi)
- Age: >545 Ma; Precambrian
- Exposed: Yes
- Drilled: No

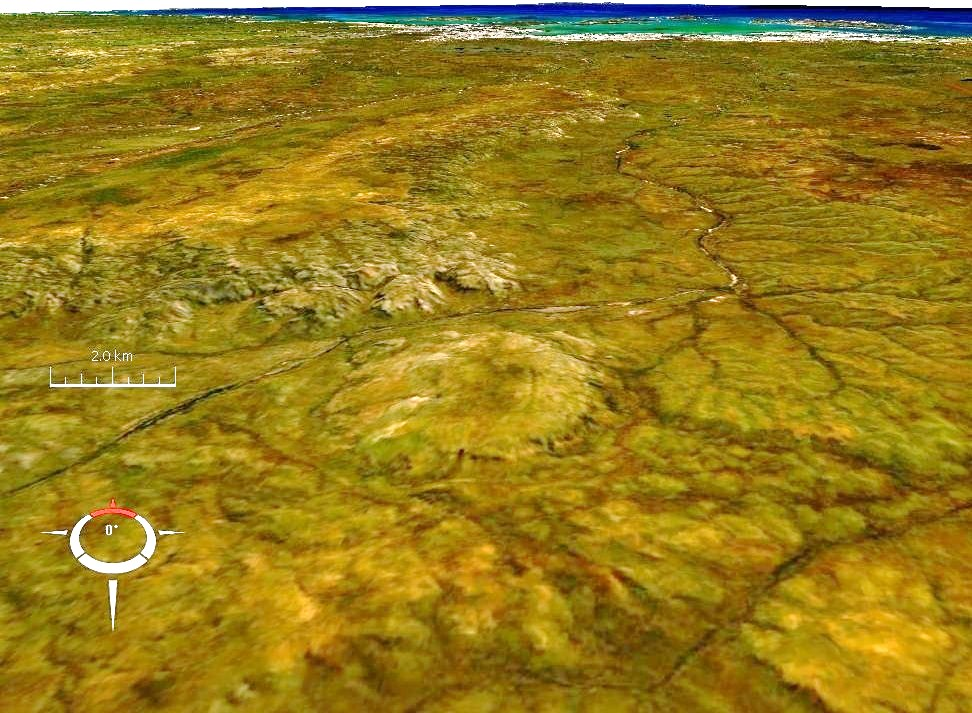
Oblique Landsat image draped over digital elevation model (x5 vertical exaggeration), Foelsche crater (beneath circular hill in centre); screen capture from NASA World Wind

Foelsche is a partly buried impact structure (or astrobleme), the eroded remnant of a former impact crater. It is situated about 85 km southeast of Borroloola in the Northern Territory, Australia, and named after the nearby Foelsche River. Although little of it is exposed at the surface, and no crater shaped topography is evident, the circular nature of the feature is obvious on aeromagnetic images, a factor that led to its discovery.

== Description ==
The impact occurred into flat-lying Mesoproterozoic sedimentary rocks of the McArthur Basin and most of the crater is covered by a semi-circular hill of flat-lying Neoproterozoic sedimentary rock. The only exposure of the crater itself are scattered outcrops of deformed sandstone and breccia around the northern edge of the overlying hill, which are inferred to be remnants of the crater rim. The rim is about 6 km in diameter. Evidence indicating an impact origin for the feature includes an abundance of shocked quartz grains in the sedimentary rocks overlying the crater; these are assumed to have been eroded from the floor of the crater. The prominent circular aeromagnetic anomaly which marks the hidden crater is believed to have been caused by the disruption of a horizontal layer of magnetic rock (igneous sill) by the impact event,.

The age of Foelsche is not well constrained, but it must be younger than the Mesoproterozoic target rocks and older than the Neoproterozoic rocks that partly fill the crater; it has been argued that the age is most likely Neoproterozoic because it appears that the crater was covered by sediments soon after the impact event.

== See also ==
- List of impact craters in Australia
