= Shoemaker impact structure =

Impact structure in Western Australia

- Teague Ring
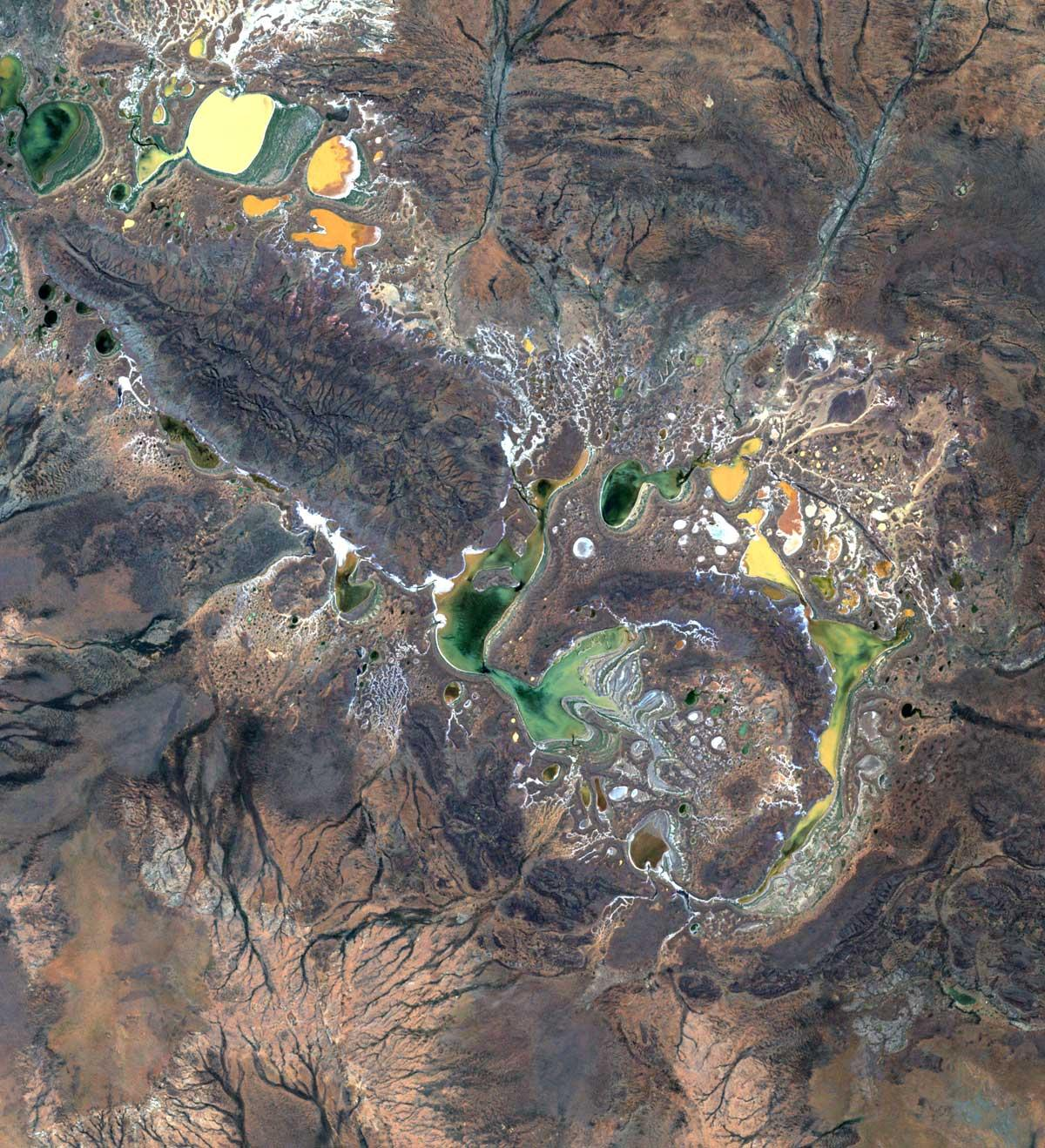
- Shoemaker impact structure from space

- Location within Australia
- Location: Mid West, Western Australia, Australia; 25°52′S 120°53′E

Impact crater structure
- Confidence: Confirmed
- Diameter: 30 km (19 mi) (minimum)
- Age: 1630 ± 5 Ma (contested); Proterozoic
- Exposed: Yes
- Drilled: No

Shoemaker (formerly known as Teague Ring) is an impact structure, the deeply eroded remnant of a former impact crater, situated in arid central Western Australia, about 100 kilometres (62 mi) north-northeast of Wiluna. It is named in honour of planetary geologist Eugene Shoemaker.

== Description ==
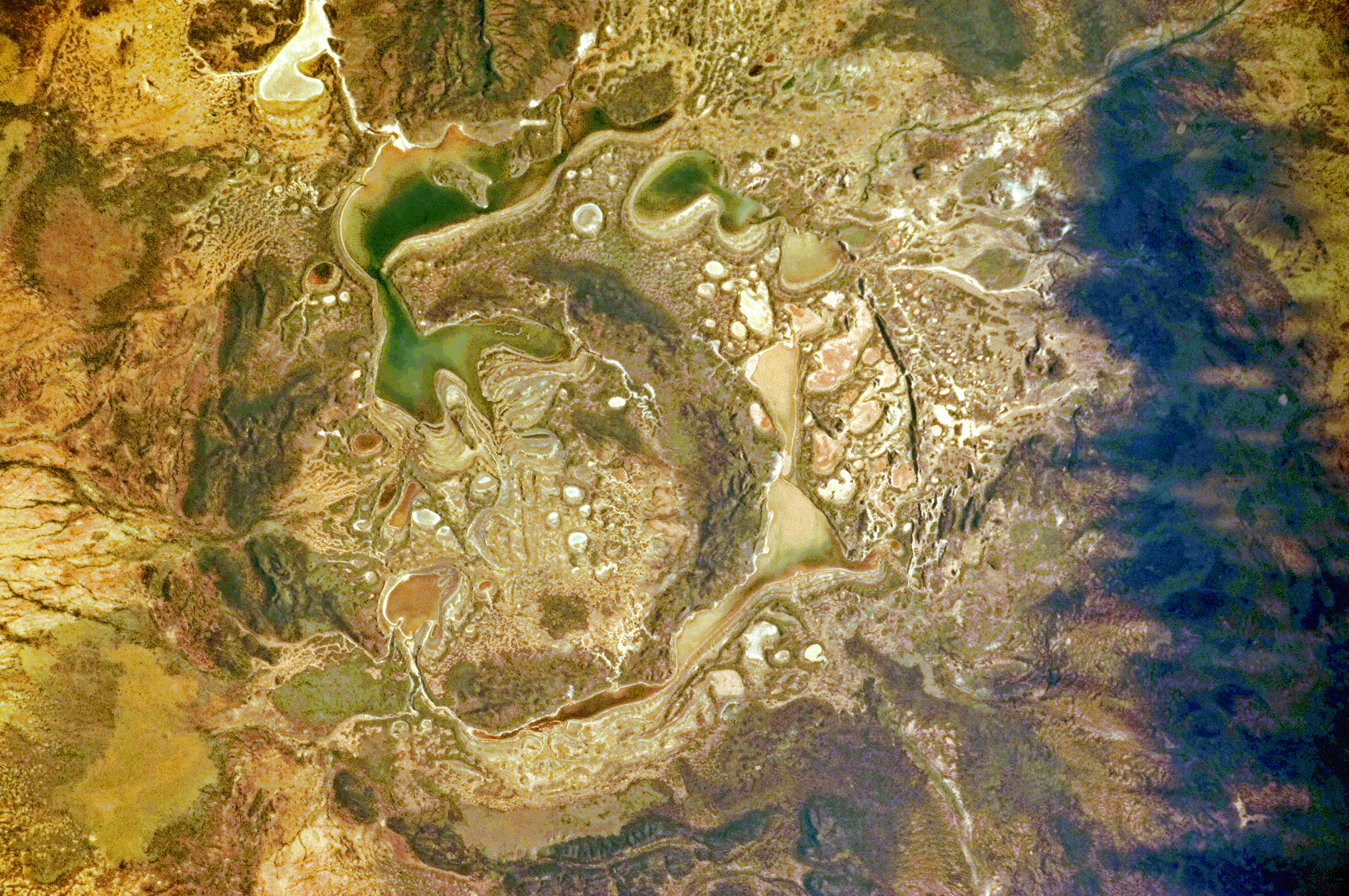
The Shoemaker impact site

The prominent ring-like topographic feature, easily seen in satellite images, lies on the boundary between the Palaeoproterozoic Earaheedy Basin and the Archaean Yilgarn craton. The area contains a number of seasonal salt lakes, the largest being Lake Teague.

The first suggestion that the ring-like topographic feature may be an impact structure was published in 1974. Subsequent research revealed definitive evidence for this hypothesis, including the presence of shatter cones and shocked quartz. The feature has a central circular region of uplifted Archaean Granite (Teague Granite) about 12 kilometres (7.5 mi) in diameter, surrounded by a downwarped ring (ring syncline) of sedimentary rocks with an outer limit of disturbance at about 30 kilometres (19 mi) diameter, which is a minimum estimate of the size of the original crater.

The age of the impact event is uncertain. It must be younger than the Teague Granite in the centre, dated at 2648 ± 8 Ma (million years ago). The most commonly cited age of about 1630 Ma represents a re-heating event affecting the granite; while this may be the impact event, it could simply be a regional tectonic event. More recent dating by K–Ar methods yield ages as young as 568 ± 20 Ma; this age could also date the impact event or represent tectonic activity.

== See also ==
- Geology of Western Australia
- List of impact craters in Australia
