= Amelia Creek crater =

Impact crater of Northern Territory

- Location within Australia
- Location: Davenport Range, Northern Territory, Australia; 20°51′S 134°53′E

Impact crater structure
- Confidence: Confirmed
- Diameter: ~20 km (12 mi)
- Age: 1640-600 Ma; Proterozoic
- Exposed: Yes
- Drilled: No

Amelia Creek crater is an impact structure (or astrobleme), the eroded remnant of a former impact crater, located in the Davenport Range, Northern Territory, Australia. It lies within a low range of Paleoproterozoic sedimentary and volcanic rocks, which are extensively folded and faulted, thus making an eroded impact crater difficult to recognize. It was only discovered by the identification of shatter cones near its centre. The central shatter cone locality is surrounded by a 20 by 12 km (12.4 by 7.5 mi) area of anomalous deformation, the asymmetry being possibly related to very oblique impact, but may be at least partly due to the preexisting structural complexity of the rocks. This deformed zone gives the best estimate for the original size of the crater. Impact took place after folding of the Paleoproterozoic rocks but before deposition of Neoproterozoic and Cambrian rocks which overlie them, thus constraining the impact event to the interval between about 1660 and 600 Ma.

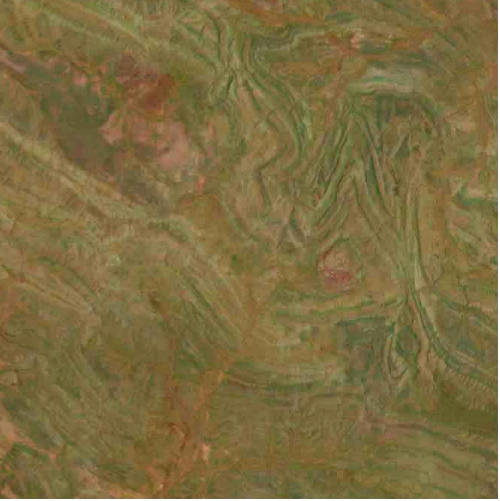
Landsat image centered on Amelia Creek structure. Image is 20 km wide.

== See also ==
- List of impact craters in Australia
