= Liverpool crater =

Impact crater in Northern Territory, Australia

- Yingundji
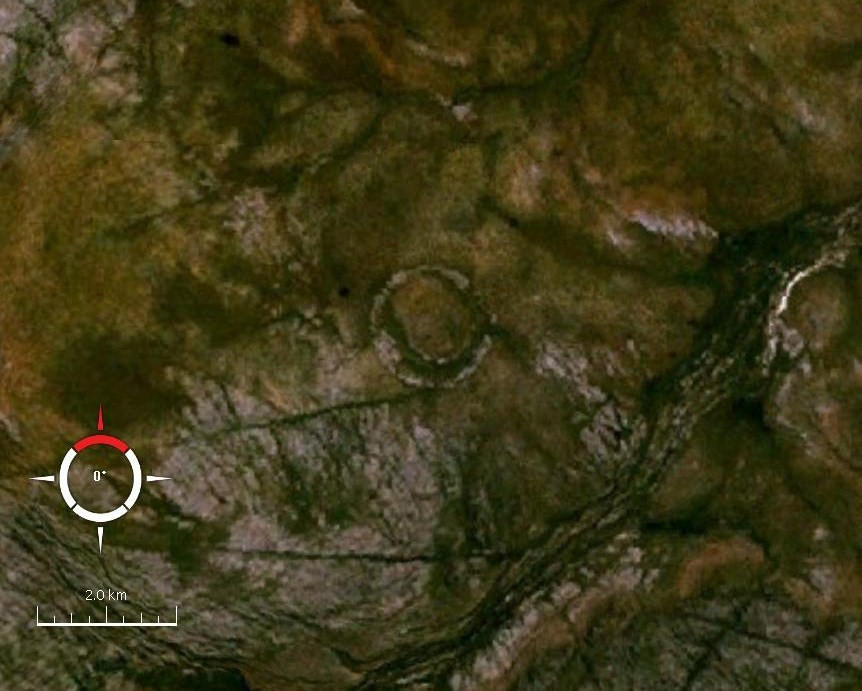
- Landsat image of the Liverpool crater (circular feature in centre); screen capture from NASA World Wind

- Location within Northern Territory
- Location: McArthur Basin, Arnhem Land, Northern Territory, Australia; 12°23′45″S 134°2′50″E

Impact crater structure
- Confidence: Confirmed
- Diameter: 1.6 km (0.99 mi)
- Age: 150 ± 70 Ma; Mesozoic
- Exposed: Yes
- Drilled: No

Liverpool is a meteorite impact crater situated in Arnhem Land within the Northern Territory, Australia. It was named after the nearby Liverpool River. Liverpool is remote and difficult to access. The crater has a raised, near-circular rim averaging about 1.6 km in diameter. It was first noticed by geologists during reconnaissance geological mapping in the 1960s, and although an impact origin was considered possible, this was not confirmed until a more detailed study was undertaken in 1970.

== Description ==
The crater lies within flat-lying Paleoproterozoic sandstone of the McArthur Basin. This sandstone has been fractured and brecciated by the impact event to form the rim. Flat-lying and non-deformed sandstone that must have been deposited after the impact event is exposed within the crater's center. Because the crater is quite well preserved, it can be argued that it was buried by younger sedimentary rock soon after the impact event; this younger rock has now been mostly eroded away except in the crater center. The crater-filling sandstone was originally thought to be of Cretaceous age, leading to the Cretaceous age listed for the crater in older literature sources. But more recent studies suggest that the infilling rock is more likely to be of Neoproterozoic age (1000-543 Ma), and therefore the crater is more likely to have formed at some time during the Neoproterozoic.

No meteorite fragments have been found at the site. This is not surprising considering its great age; such fragments would have weathered away. Evidence supporting an impact origin includes the geological structure of the crater, and the discovery of shocked quartz. The crater is not perfectly circular, but is about 6% broader in a northeast–southwest direction. And the internal parts of the crater are asymmetric in such a way as to imply that the impact was oblique from the southwest.

== Aboriginal significance ==
The Aboriginal people of Western Arnhem Land named Liverpool crater Yingundji and describe it as the nest of a giant catfish. This is supported by pictographs of giant catfish on the walls of a rock shelter within the crater.

== See also ==
- List of impact craters in Australia
