= Glikson crater =

Impact crater in central Western Australia

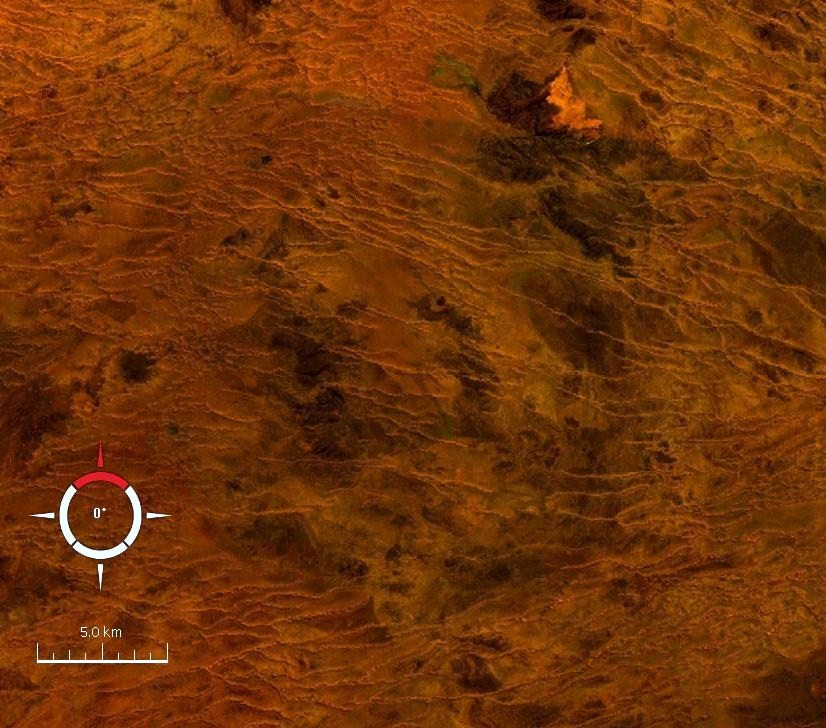
- Landsat image of the area around Glikson crater, the eroded relics of the crater are not clearly visible; screen capture from the NASA World Wind program

- Location within Western Australia
- Location: Little Sandy Desert, Western Australia, Australia; 23°59′S 121°34′E

Impact crater structure
- Confidence: Confirmed
- Diameter: 19 km (12 mi)
- Age: Paleozoic
- Exposed: Yes
- Drilled: No

Glikson crater is an impact structure (or astrobleme), the eroded remnant of an impact crater, situated in the Little Sandy Desert of central Western Australia. A possible impact structure was first reported in 1997, and named after Australian geologist A. Y. Glikson, attention to the site being drawn by the presence of a prominent 14 km diameter ring-shaped aeromagnetic anomaly. The area within the ring contains sparse outcrop of uplifted and deformed Neoproterozoic sandstone, but is largely covered by sand dunes. The recent discovery of shatter cones and microscopic shock effects is reliable evidence for an impact origin. Deformation of the sandstone consistent with an impact origin extends out to a diameter of 19 km, which is the best estimate for the original diameter of the original crater. The ring-shaped aeromagnetic anomaly was probably caused by disruption of a horizontal layer of magnetic igneous rock, known as a sill, by the impact event. Nearby outcrops of dolerite have been dated at 508 ± 5 Ma (Middle Cambrian), and if this is the same rock causing the aeromagnetic anomaly, then the impact must be younger, probably of Paleozoic age.
