= Gosses Bluff impact structure =

Impact structure in Northern Territory

- Tnorala
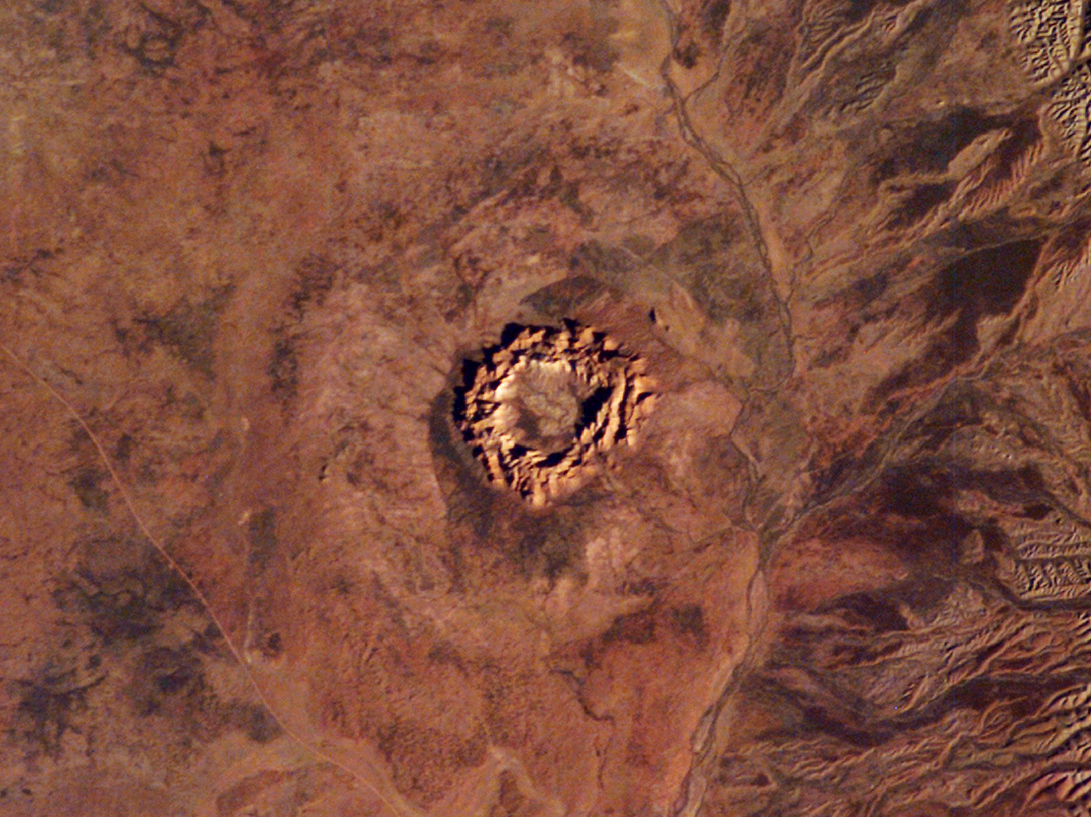
- View of Gosses Bluff impact structure

- Location within Australia
- Location: Namatjira, MacDonnell Region, Northern Territory, Australia; 23°49′15″S 132°18′28″E

Impact crater structure
- Confidence: Confirmed
- Diameter: 22 km (14 mi)
- Age: 142.5 ± 0.8 Ma; Early Cretaceous
- Exposed: Yes
- Drilled: Yes

Gosses Bluff (or Gosse's Bluff) is thought to be the eroded remnant of an impact crater. Known as Tnorala to the Western Arrernte people of the surrounding region, it is located in the southern Northern Territory, near the centre of Australia, about 175 km (109 mi) west of Alice Springs and about 212 km (132 mi) to the north-east of Uluru (Ayers Rock). It was named by Ernest Giles in 1872 after Australian explorer William Gosse's brother Henry, who was a member of William's expedition.

== Formation ==
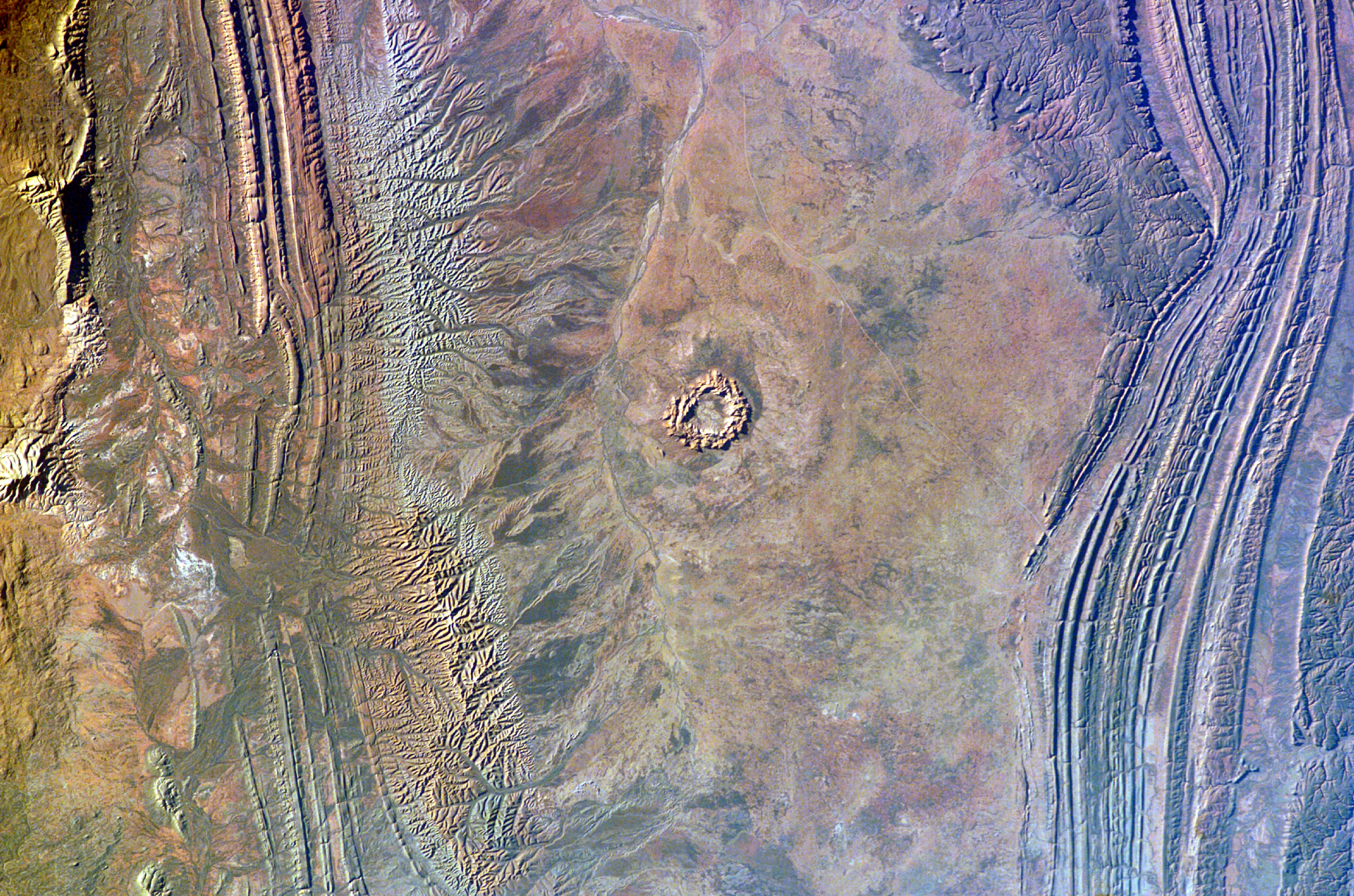
Gosses Bluff impact structure photographed from the ISS

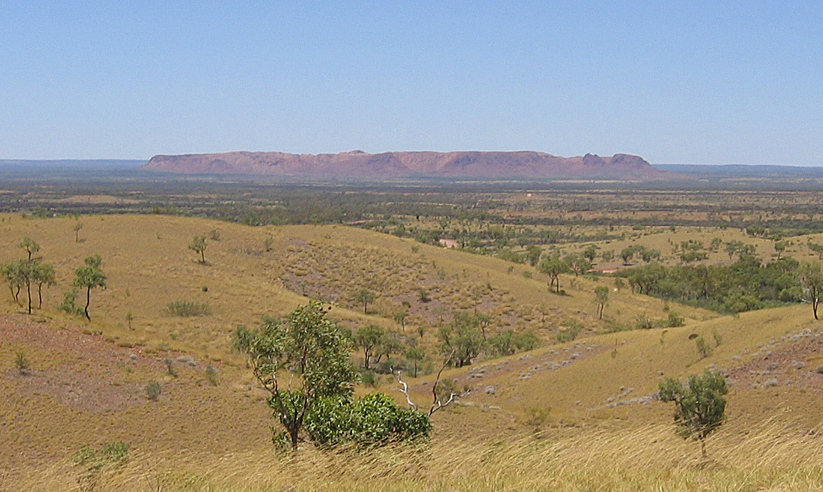
Gosses Bluff from the north, approximately 15 km (9.3 mi) away

The original crater is thought to have been formed by the impact of an asteroid or comet approximately 142.5 ± 0.8 million years ago, in the earliest Cretaceous, very close to the Jurassic–Cretaceous boundary. The original crater rim has been estimated at 22 km (14 mi) in diameter, but this has been eroded away. The five-kilometre-diameter (3.1 mi), 180-metre-high (590 ft) crater-like feature, now exposed, is interpreted as the eroded relic of the crater's central uplift. The impact origin of this topographic feature was first proposed in the 1960s, the strongest evidence coming from the abundance of shatter cones. In the past the crater has been the target of petroleum exploration, and two abandoned exploration wells lie near its centre.

== Cultural significance ==
The site is known as Tnorala to the Aboriginal people of the Western Arrernte language group, and is a sacred place. It is now located in the Tnorala Conservation Reserve. A Western Arrernte story attributes its origins to a cosmic impact: in the Dreamtime, a group of celestial women were dancing as stars in the Milky Way. One of the women grew tired and placed her baby in a wooden basket, or turna (also known as a coolamon). As the women continued dancing, the basket fell and plunged into the earth. The baby fell to the earth and forced the rocks upward, forming the circular mountain range. The baby's parents, the evening and morning star, continue to search for their baby to this day. The turna can be seen in the sky as the constellation Corona Australis.

== In popular culture ==
Gosses Bluff is the inspiration for the impact crater located in the fictional Mia Tukurta National Park in the novel and Amazon Prime series The Lost Flowers of Alice Hart.

== See also ==
- List of impact structures in Australia
