= Goodenia valdentata =

Davenport Range goodenia

Scientific classification
- Kingdom: Plantae
- Clade: Tracheophytes
- Clade: Angiosperms
- Clade: Eudicots
- Clade: Asterids
- Order: Asterales
- Family: Goodeniaceae
- Genus: Goodenia
- Species: G. valdentata

Binomial name
- Goodenia valdentata P.J.lang

Species of plant

Goodenia valdentata, commonly known as Davenport Range goodenia, is a species of flowering plant in the family Goodeniaceae and is endemic to a restricted area of South Australia. It is a subshrub with erect branches, coarsely-toothed, egg-shaped leaves and bright yellow flowers usually arranged singly in upper leaf axils.

== Description ==
Goodenia valdentata is a subshrub that typically grows up to 80 cm (31 in) high and wide with erect branches, the foliage covered with simple and glandular hairs. The leaves are egg-shaped, 16–36 mm (0.63–1.42 in) long and 9–25 mm (0.35–0.98 in) wide with coarsely toothed edges, on a petiole 7–20 mm (0.28–0.79 in) long. There are up to six widely-spaced lobes 2–5 mm (0.079–0.197 in) long on the sides of the petiole. The flowers are usually arranged singly, rarely in pairs in upper leaf axils on peduncles 1–1.5 mm (0.039–0.059 in) long with leaf-like bracts and narrow lance-shaped bracteoles 6–10.5 mm (0.24–0.41 in) long. Each flower is on a pedicel 5–11 mm (0.20–0.43 in) long, the sepal lobes narrow lance-shaped, 5.7–8 mm (0.22–0.31 in) long. The petals are bright yellow, 25–30 mm (0.98–1.18 in) long, the lower lobes 7–12 mm (0.28–0.47 in) long with wings 1.4–2 mm (0.055–0.079 in) wide. The fruit is an elliptical capsule about 10–14 mm (0.39–0.55 in) long and 5–7 mm (0.20–0.28 in) wide.

== Taxonomy and naming ==
Goodenia valdentata was first formally described in 2014 by Peter J. Lang in the Journal of the Adelaide Botanic Gardens from material collected by "F.J. Badman per W.R.Barker" near Levi Springs Bore in 1986. The specific epithet (valdentata) means "strongly-toothed". The common name Davenport Range goodenia refers to a range in the Lake Eyre region, part of the Peake and Denison Ranges that are part of the Adelaide Geosyncline fold belt, not to the Davenport Range in the Northern Territory.

== Distribution and habitat ==
This goodenia grows on stony or rocky soil in open woodland in the Davenport Range area near Lake Eyre.
