= Spider crater =

Impact crater in Western Australia

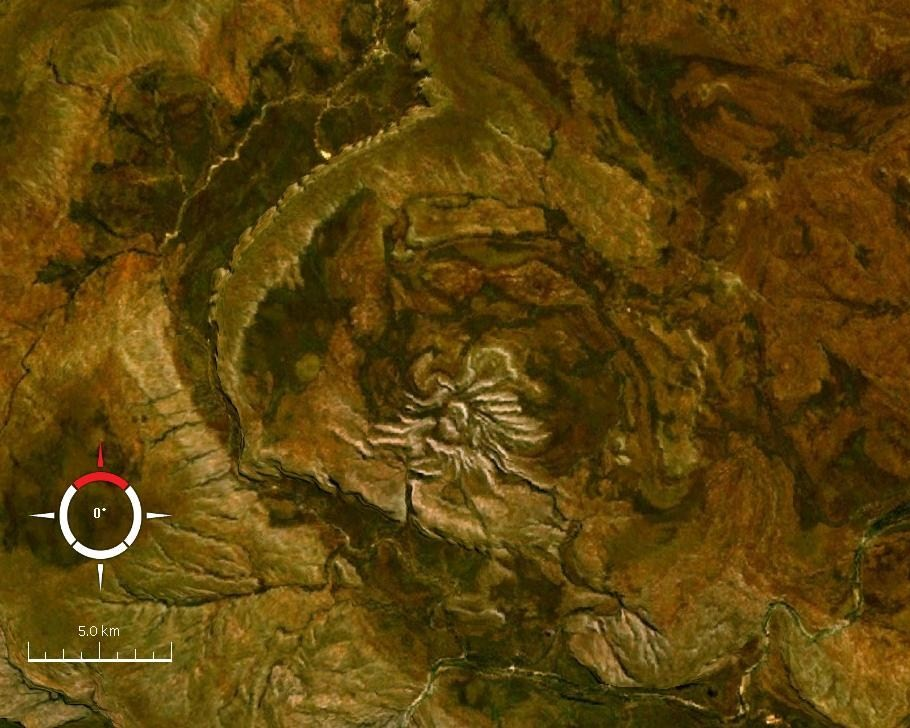
- Landsat image of the Spider crater; screen capture from NASA WorldWind

- Location within Western Australia
- Location: Kimberley, Western Australia, Australia; 16°44′22″S 126°5′25″E

Impact crater structure
- Confidence: Confirmed
- Diameter: 13 km (8.1 mi)
- Age: >550 Ma; Precambrian
- Exposed: Yes
- Drilled: No

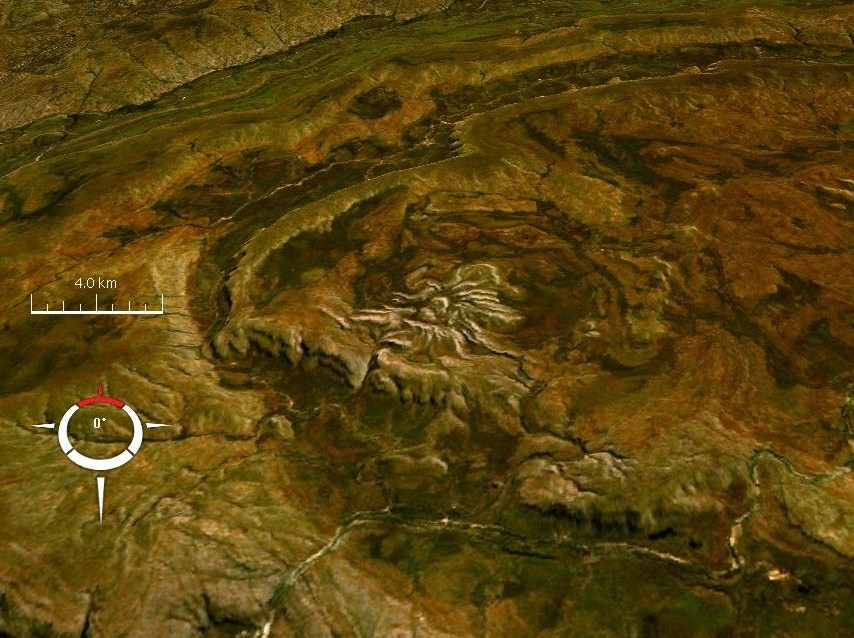
Oblique Landsat image draped over digital elevation data (×5 vertical exaggeration), Spider crater; screen capture from NASA WorldWind

Spider is an impact structure, the deeply eroded remnant of a former impact crater, situated in the Kimberley region of northern Western Australia, 18 km east of the Mount Barnett Roadhouse on the Gibb River Road. Due to very rugged terrain the site is effectively inaccessible. The name is derived from the visually striking spider-like radiating ridges of quartzite prominently visible from the air or on satellite images.

== Description ==
The unusual geological structure has been a puzzle since the 1950s, but it was not until shatter cones were discovered it the centre in the late 1970s that it was realized that it was an eroded impact structure. The central area bearing shatter cones is interpreted as the relic of a central uplift with the outer limits of disturbance confined to a subcircular area about 11 x 13 km in diameter; the original crater may have been slightly greater than this due to the depth of erosion. The asymmetry of the structure lead some geologists to conclude that the projectile had a very low angle trajectory from the north or northwest, while others suggest that the asymmetry may be at least partly due to the effect of pre-existing topography.

The age of the Spider impact event is not accurately constrained, but it has been argued it occurred after gentle folding of the Palaeoproterozoic quartzite, but before a regional episode of glacial erosion; if correct it occurred between 900 and 600 Ma i.e. during the Neoproterozoic.
