= Goat Paddock crater =

Impact crater in Western Australia

Goat Paddock Crater
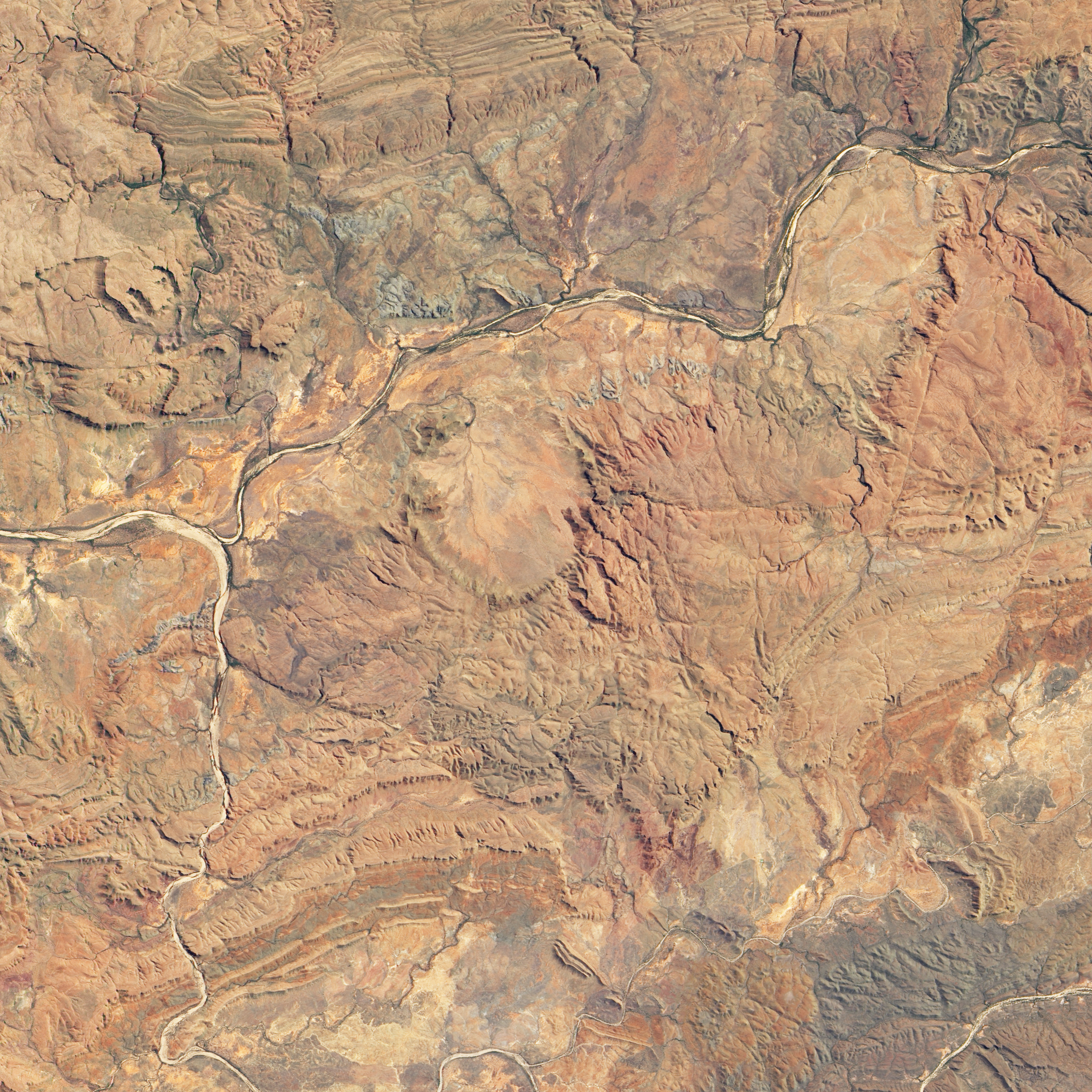

- Location within Western Australia
- Location: Western Australia, Australia; 18°20′S 126°40′E

Impact crater structure
- Confidence: Confirmed
- Diameter: 5.1 km (3.2 mi)
- Age: c. 50 million years
- Exposed: Yes
- Drilled: No

Goat Paddock Crater is an impact crater in a range of gently dipping Proterozoic sandstone in the Kimberley Region of northern Western Australia, 106 km west-southwest of Halls Creek. It is interpreted as an ancient meteorite impact crater, the evidence including breccia containing melted rocks, silica glass, shatter cones and shocked quartz. Drilling shows that the crater is filled with about 200 metres of ancient lake sediments containing Early Eocene pollen, this age thus giving a minimum estimate for the age of the crater itself. The crater is not perfectly circular, slightly elongated in a north–south direction, suggesting that the projectile struck at low angle from either the north or south.

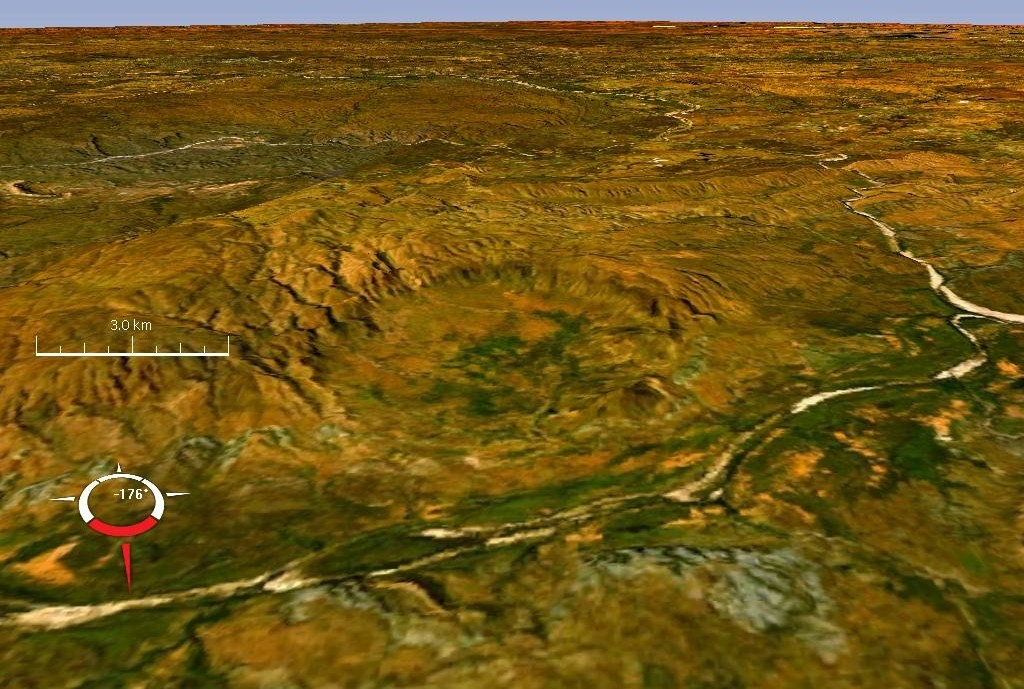
Oblique Landsat image draped over digital elevation data (x3 vertical exaggeration), Goat Paddock crater (circular feature in centre); screen capture from the NASA World Wind program

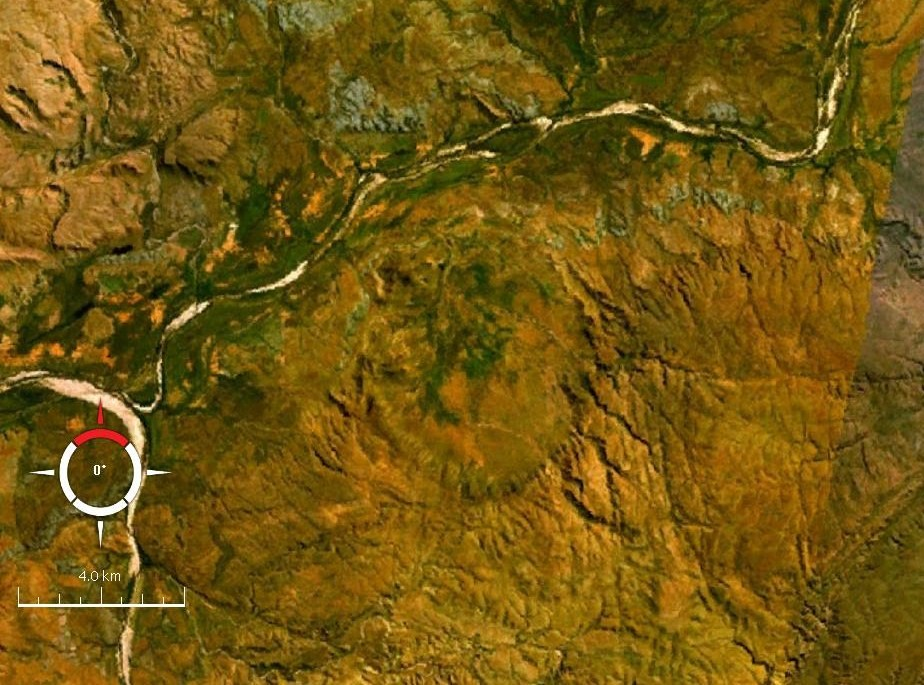
Landsat image of the Goat Paddock crater (circular feature in centre); screen capture from the NASA World Wind program
