= Kelly West crater =

Impact crater in Northern Territory, Australia

- Location within Northern Territory
- Location: Tennant Creek, Northern Territory, Australia; 19°56′S 133°57′E

Impact crater structure
- Confidence: Confirmed
- Diameter: 6.6 km (4.1 mi)
- Age: Precambrian
- Exposed: No
- Drilled: No

Kelly West is a deeply eroded impact crater situated in the central Northern Territory, Australia. It was discovered during Government geological mapping and first reported in 1973, the evidence for impact coming principally from an abundance of shatter cones at the site.

== Description ==
The surface expression of Kelly West comprises a circular hill of Palaeoproterozoic quartzite about 2 km (1.2 mi) in diameter, interpreted as a central uplift of a larger complex impact crater. Recent geophysical interpretation suggests an original crater diameter of 6.6 km (4.1 mi), less than earlier estimates of about 10 km (6.2 mi). The age is poorly constrained, but must be older than Middle Cambrian because sedimentary rocks of this age overlie the central uplift and were not deformed by the impact event.

== See also ==
- List of impact craters in Australia
