= Matt Wilson (crater) =

Impact crater in Northern Territory

- Location within Northern Territory
- Location: Gregory National Park, Northern Territory, Australia; 15°30′4″S 131°10′43″E

Impact crater structure
- Confidence: Confirmed
- Diameter: ~7.5 km (4.7 mi)
- Age: 1402 ± 440 Ma; Precambrian
- Exposed: Yes
- Drilled: No

Matt Wilson is a confirmed impact crater, elliptical in shape and situated in Gregory National Park about 17 kilometres (11 mi) north of the Victoria River Roadhouse in the Northern Territory, Australia. Its size is 7.5 by 6.3 kilometres (4.7 mi × 3.9 mi) , with its long axis trending northeast–southwest.

== See also ==
- List of impact craters in Australia
