= Darwin Crater =

Impact crater in Tasmania, Australia

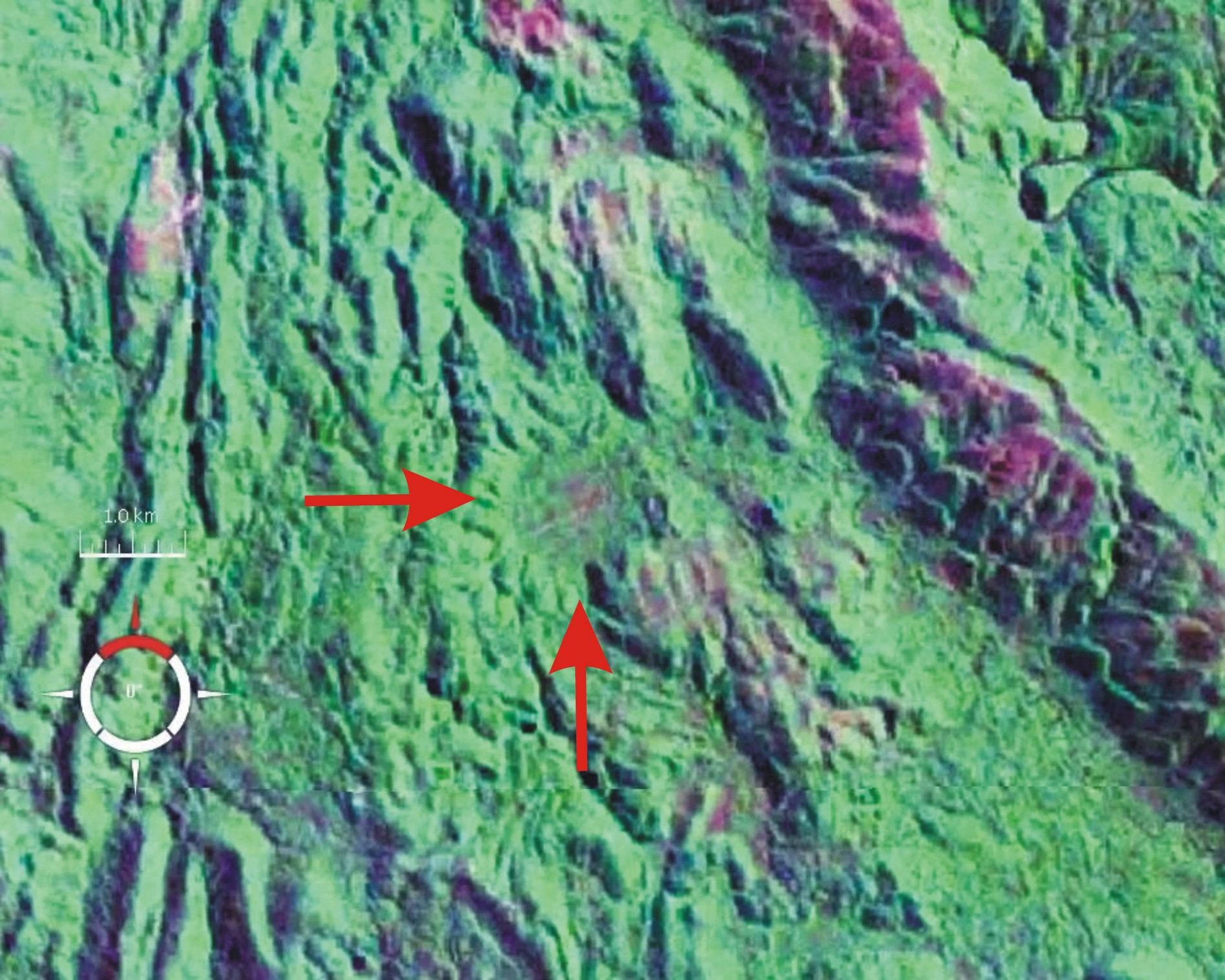
- False-colour Landsat image of Darwin Crater (arrowed); screen capture from NASA World Wind

- Coordinates: 42°18′15″S 145°39′27″E
- Country: Australia
- State: Tasmania

Darwin Crater is a suspected meteorite impact crater in Western Tasmania about 26 km (16 mi) south of Queenstown, just within the Franklin-Gordon Wild Rivers National Park. The crater is expressed as a rimless circular flat-floored depression, 1.2 km (0.75 mi) in diameter, within mountainous and heavily forested terrain. It is east of the West Coast Range and the former North Mount Lyell Railway formation.

== Discovery and description ==
The crater was discovered by the geologist R. J. Ford in 1972, after a search for the source of Darwin glass, an impact glass found over more than 400 square kilometres (150 sq mi) of southwestern Tasmania. Geophysical investigations and drilling have shown that the crater is filled with up to 230 metres (750 ft) of breccia capped by Pleistocene lake sediments. Although definitive proof of an impact origin of the crater is lacking, the impact hypothesis is strongly supported by the relationship of the glass to the crater, as well as the stratigraphy and deformation of the crater-filling material.

If the crater is indeed the source of the glass, the age of Darwin Crater is 816,000 ± 7,000 years—the age of Darwin glass as determined by argon–argon dating method.

Carbonaceous inclusions have been found for the first time in Darwin glass: these have been shown to be biomarkers which survived the Darwin impact and are representative of plant species in the local ecosystem—including cellulose, lignin, aliphatic biopolymer and protein remnants.

== Drilling ==
Various projects have drilled at the site. In 2007, Howard and Haines reported on their research. In 2018, the sediments in the crater were drilled and investigated.

== Access ==
While there was a trail leading to the crater in the 1970s, accounts note that it is unmaintained, overgrown and boggy in places.

== Gallery ==
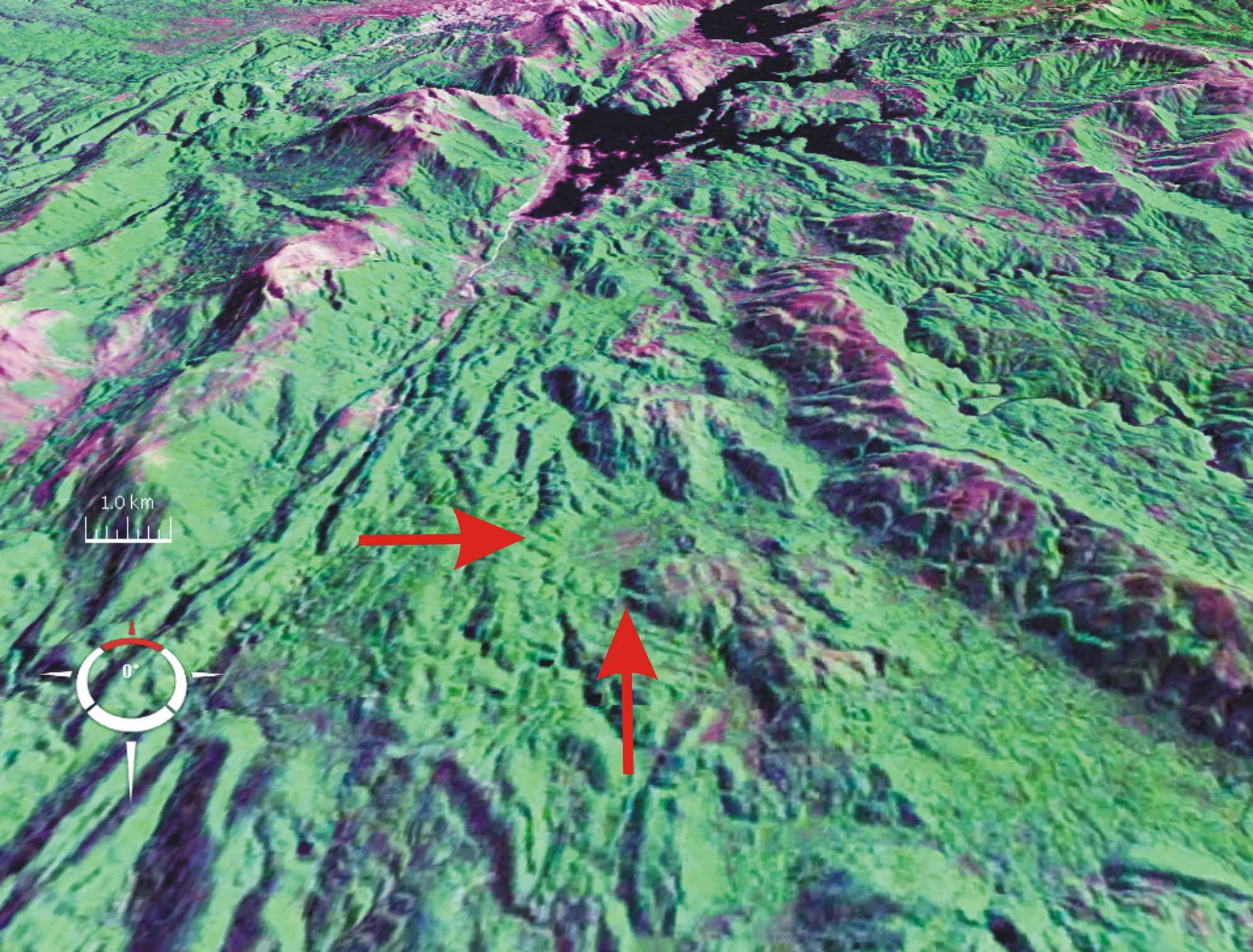
Oblique false-colour Landsat image of Darwin Crater (arrowed) draped over digital elevation model; screen capture from NASA World Wind

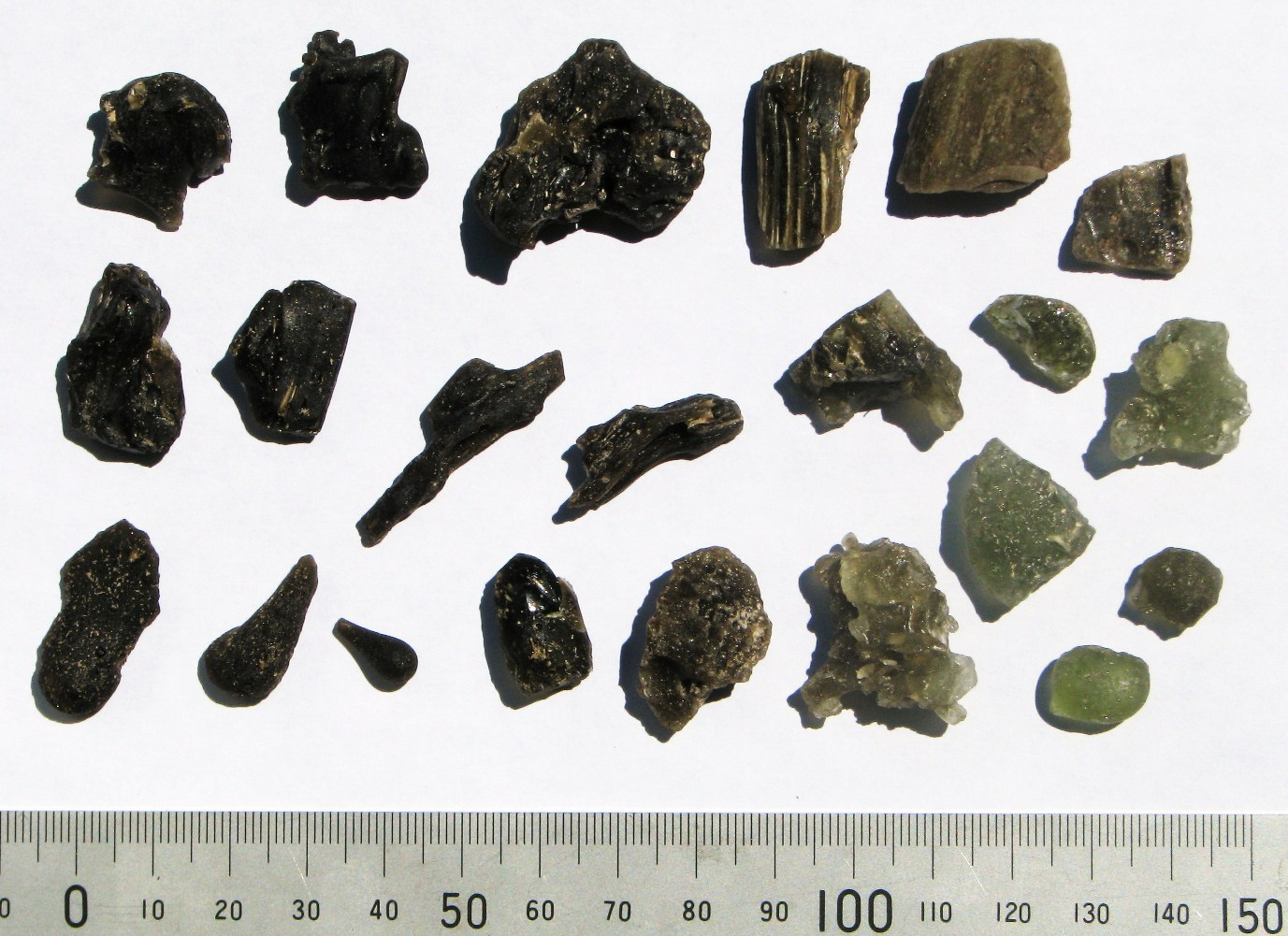
Assorted fragments of Darwin glass (scale in mm)

== See also ==
- List of impact craters in Australia
- Protected areas of Tasmania
