= Dalgaranga crater =

Impact crater in Western Australia

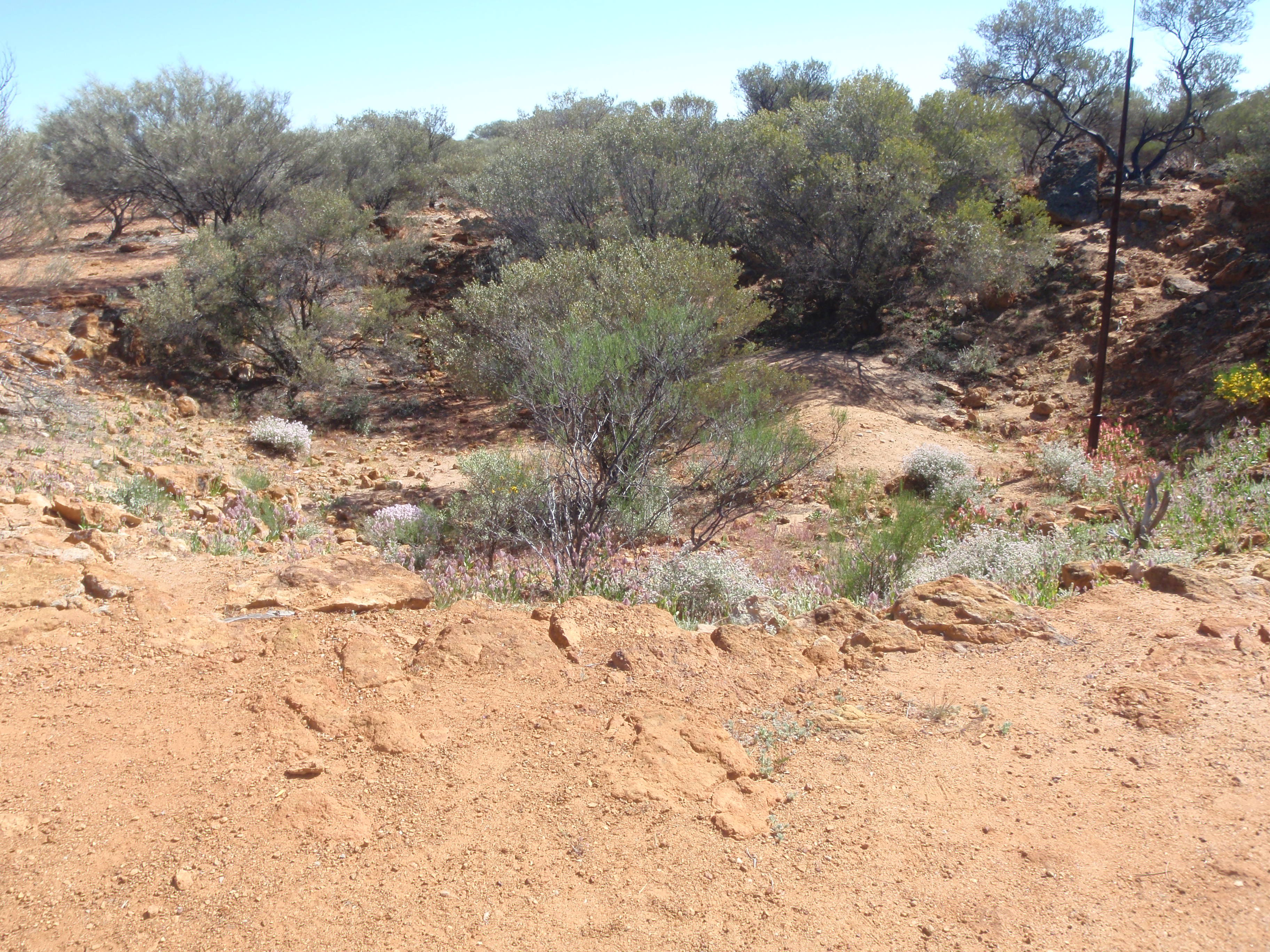
- The Dalgaranga crater in September 2009

- Location within Western Australia
- Location: Yilgarn craton, Western Australia, Australia; 27°38′6″S 117°17′20″E

Impact crater structure
- Confidence: Confirmed
- Diameter: 24 m (79 ft)
- Depth: 3 m (9.8 ft)
- Age: ?3 ka Holocene
- Exposed: Yes
- Drilled: No
- Bolide type: Mesosiderite

Dalgaranga crater is a small meteorite impact crater located on Dalgaranga pastoral station 75 km (47 mi) northwest of Mount Magnet (or north of Yalgoo) in Western Australia. It is only 24 m (79 ft) in diameter and 3 m (9.8 ft) deep, making it Australia's smallest impact crater (with exception of the smallest members of the Henbury crater field). Though discovered in 1921, it was not reported in the scientific literature until 1938. The bedrock at the site is weathered Archaean granite of the Yilgarn craton. The discovery of fragments of mesosiderite stony-iron meteorite around the crater confirms an impact origin, making this crater unique as the only one known to have been produced by a mesosiderite projectile.

== Description ==
Asymmetries in the crater structure and the ejecta blanket imply that the projectile impacted at low angle from the south-southeast. The age is not accurately constrained but must be young because it is so well preserved for its small size, and the meteorite fragments have not weathered away; some authors suggest an age of as young as 3000 years.

== Discovery ==
The crater was discovered by an Aboriginal stockman named Billy Seward in 1921. The meteorites were found shortly after by Gerard Wellard, the station manager, when Seward took him to the site. It was not until 1923 that meteorite fragments were sent to the Western Australian Museum.
