= Iytwelepenty / Davenport Range National Park =

National park in the Northern Territory, Australia

Coordinates: 20.8600°S 134.9410°E

- IUCN category II (national park)
- Iytwelepenty/Davenport Range National Park (outlined in green)
- Location: Northern Territory, Davenport
- Nearest city: Tennant Creek
- Area: 1,278.47 km^{2} (493.62 sq mi)
- Established: 1993
- Governing body: Parks and Wildlife Commission of the Northern Territory
- Website: Official website

Iytwelepenty / Davenport Range, or Davenport Ranges National Park (Iytwellepenty), previously the Davenport Murchison National Park, is a national park in the Northern Territory of Australia about 1,033 kilometres (642 mi) south-east of the territorial capital of Darwin, occupying around 1,120 km^{2} (430 sq mi)s of the Davenport Range. It lies within the Davenport Murchison Ranges bioregion, an area of 58,050 km^{2} (22,410 sq mi), with a climate ranging from semiarid to subtropical.

The mountains were caused by a tectonic event hundreds of millions of years ago, but recent images from space have shown that erosion occurred that exposed the ridges and valleys only around 100 million years ago. Amelia Creek crater, an ancient eroded impact crater lies within the Davenport Range in the area.

== See also ==
- Protected areas of the Northern Territory

== Gallery ==
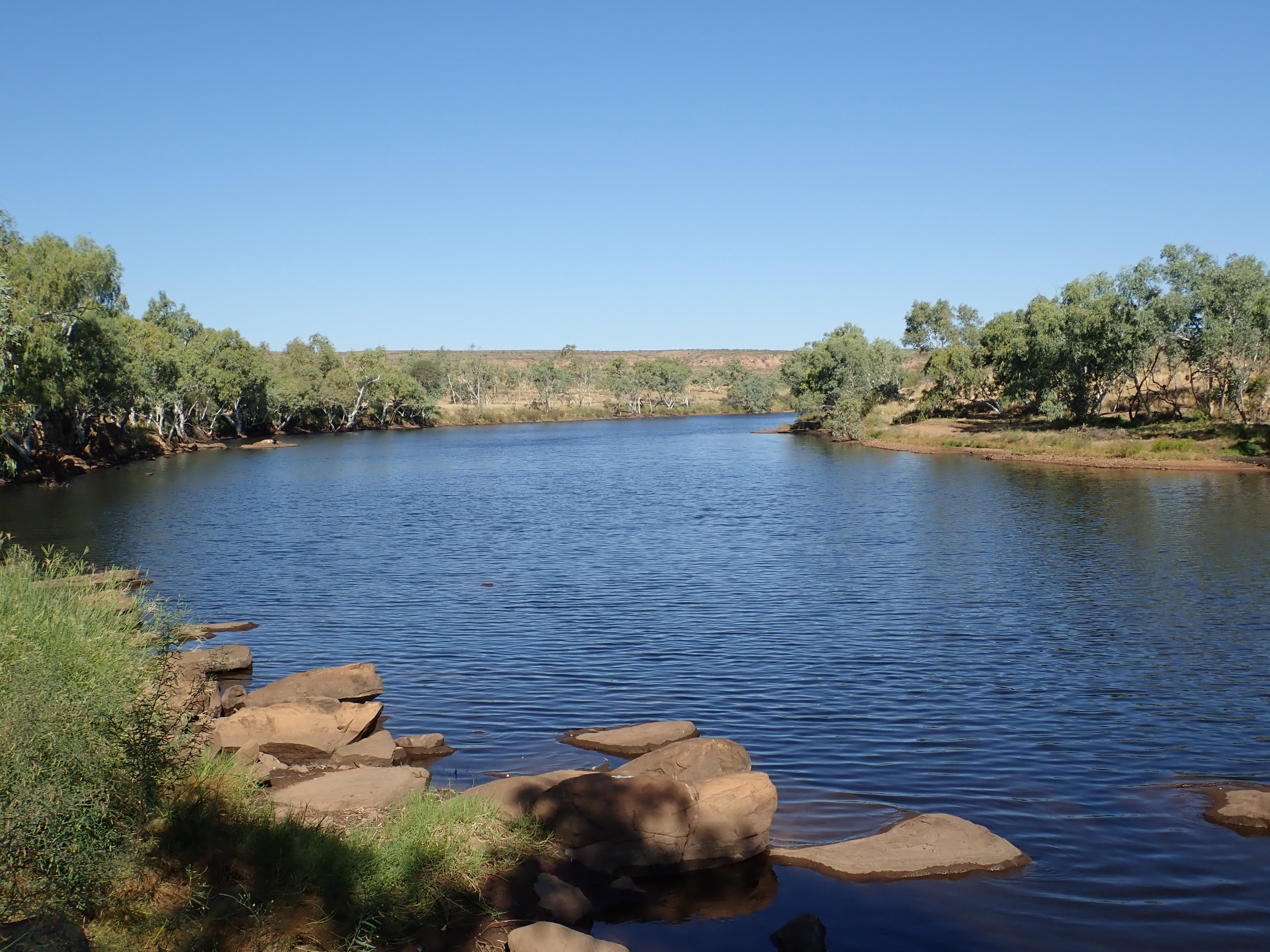
Old Police Station Waterhole

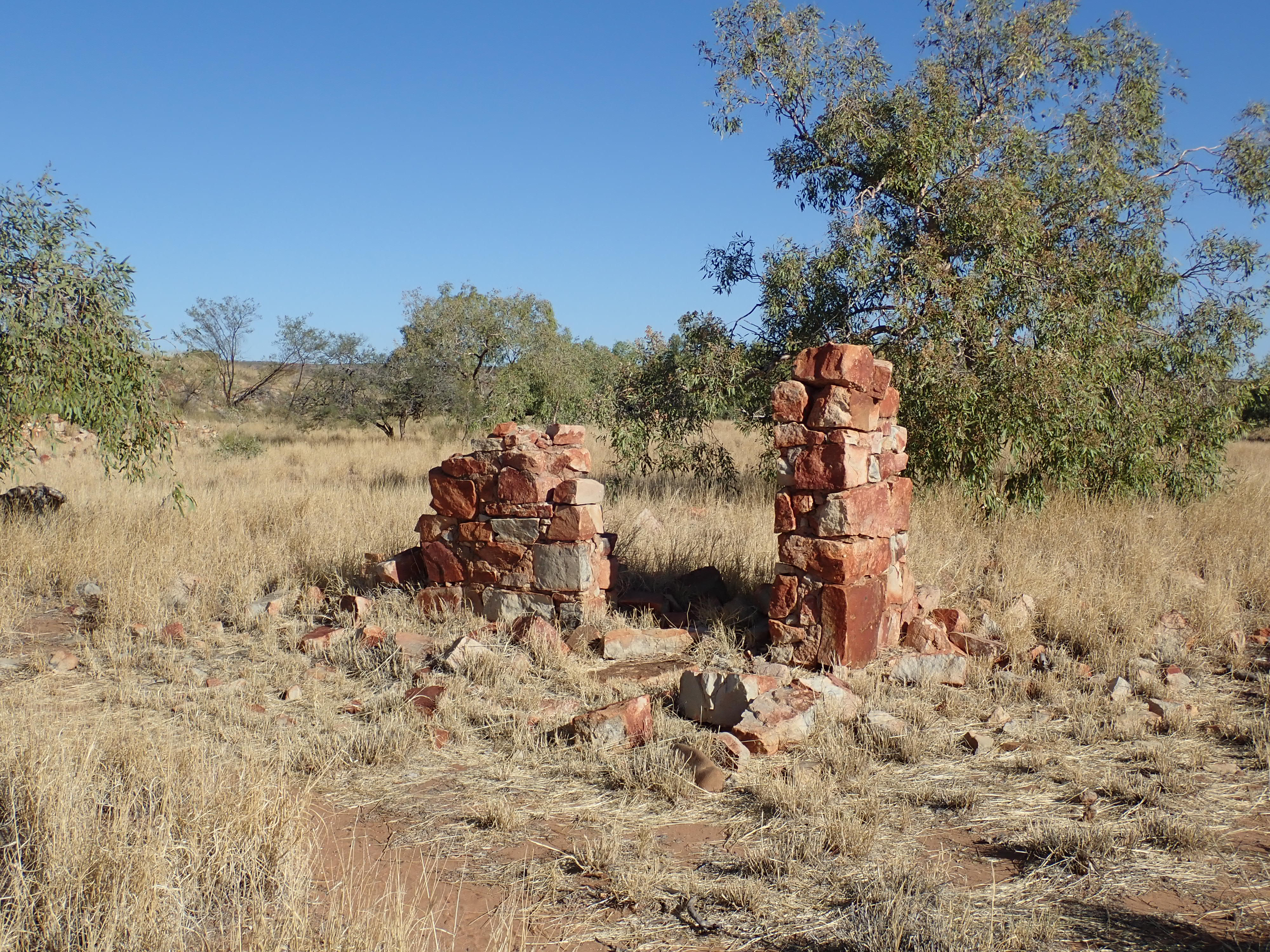
Old Police Station ruins
