= Aeromagnetic survey =

Surveying method, analyzing the magnetic properties of large regions from high altitudes

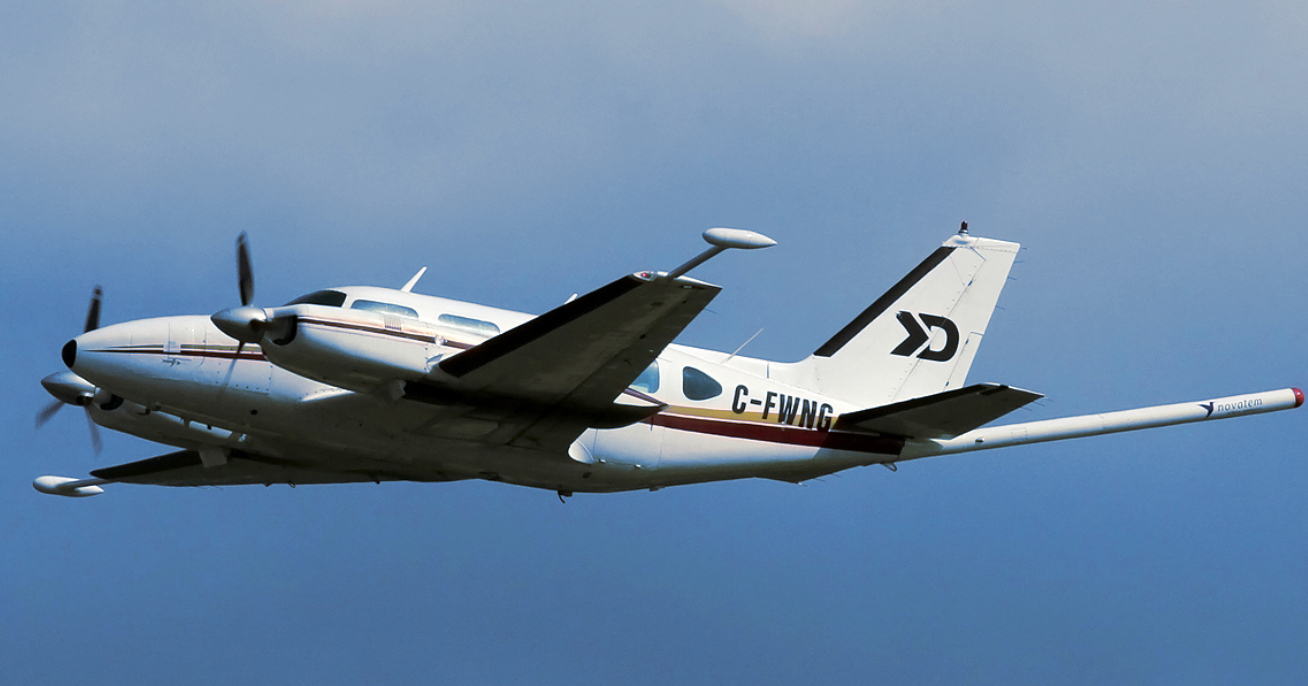
Modified aircraft, equipped with a stinger and wing extensions, where magnetometers are installed

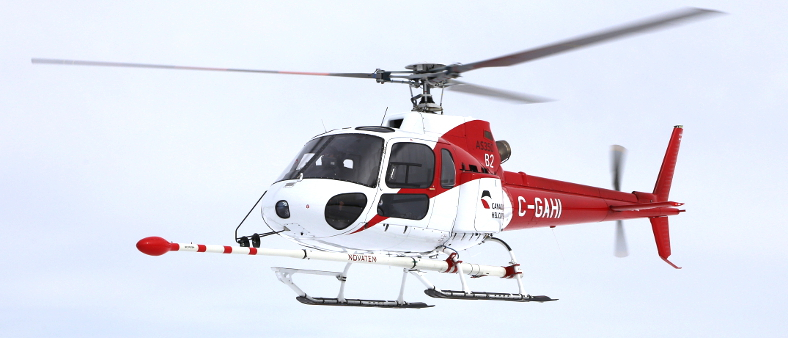
Helicopter equipped with a magnetometer mounted in a stinger

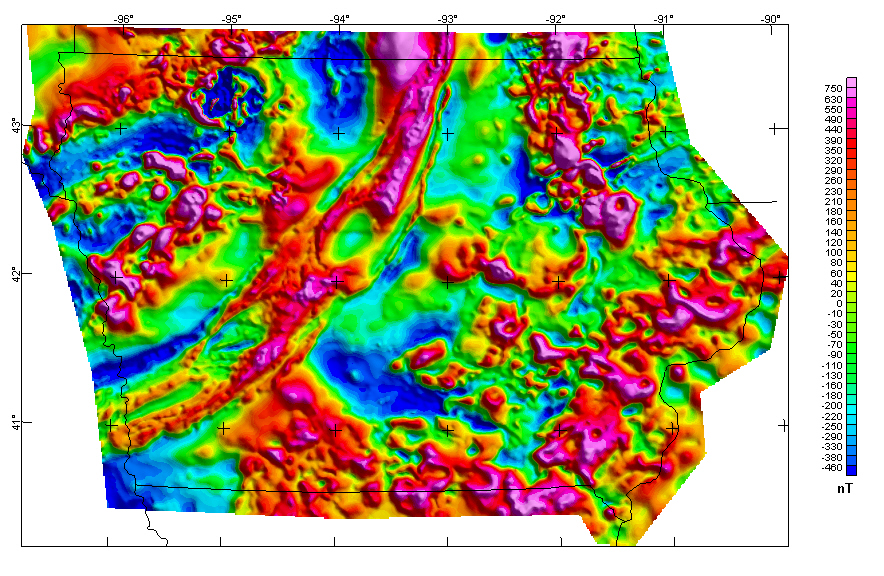
Map of measure magnetic field

An aeromagnetic survey is a common type of geophysical survey carried out using a magnetometer aboard or towed behind an aircraft. The principle is similar to a magnetic survey carried out with a hand-held magnetometer, but allows much larger areas of the Earth's surface to be covered quickly for regional reconnaissance. The aircraft typically flies in a grid-like pattern with height and line spacing determining the resolution of the data (and cost of the survey per unit area).

== Method ==
As the aircraft flies, the magnetometer measures and records the total intensity of the magnetic field at the sensor, which is a combination of the desired magnetic field generated in the Earth as well as tiny variations due to the temporal effects of the constantly varying solar wind and the magnetic field of the survey aircraft. By subtracting the solar, regional, and aircraft effects, the resulting aeromagnetic map shows the spatial distribution and relative abundance of magnetic minerals (most commonly the iron oxide mineral magnetite) in the upper levels of the Earth's crust. Because different rock types differ in their content of magnetic minerals, the magnetic map allows a visualization of the geological structure of the upper crust in the subsurface, particularly the spatial geometry of bodies of rock and the presence of faults and folds. This is particularly useful where bedrock is obscured by surface sand, soil or water. Aeromagnetic data were once presented as contour plots, but now are more commonly expressed as thematic (colored) and shaded computer-generated pseudo-topography images. The apparent hills, ridges and valleys are referred to as aeromagnetic anomalies. A geophysicist can use mathematical modeling to infer the shape, depth and properties of the rock bodies responsible for the anomalies.

Airplanes are normally used for high-level reconnaissance surveys in gentle terrain, and helicopters are used in mountainous terrain or where more detail is required.

== History ==
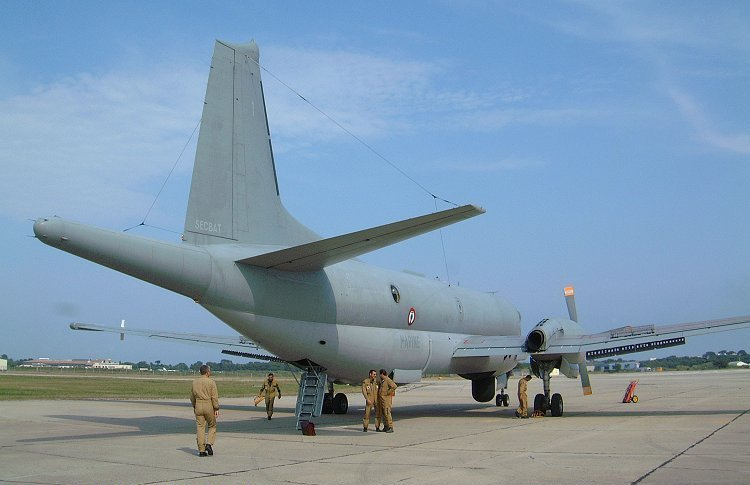
Maritime patrol aircraft to detect submarines using Magnetic Anomaly Detector (MAD) (Dassault Atlantique 2)

Aeromagnetic surveys were first performed in World War II to detect submarines using a Magnetic Anomaly Detector attached to an aircraft. This method is still widely used by military maritime patrol aircraft.

== Uses ==
Aeromagnetic surveys are widely used to aid in the production of geological maps and are also commonly used during mineral exploration and petroleum exploration. Some mineral deposits are associated with an increase or decrease in the abundance of magnetic minerals, and occasionally the sought after commodity may itself be magnetic (e.g. iron ore deposits), but often the elucidation of the subsurface structure of the upper crust is the most valuable contribution of the aeromagnetic data.

== Unexploded ordnance ==
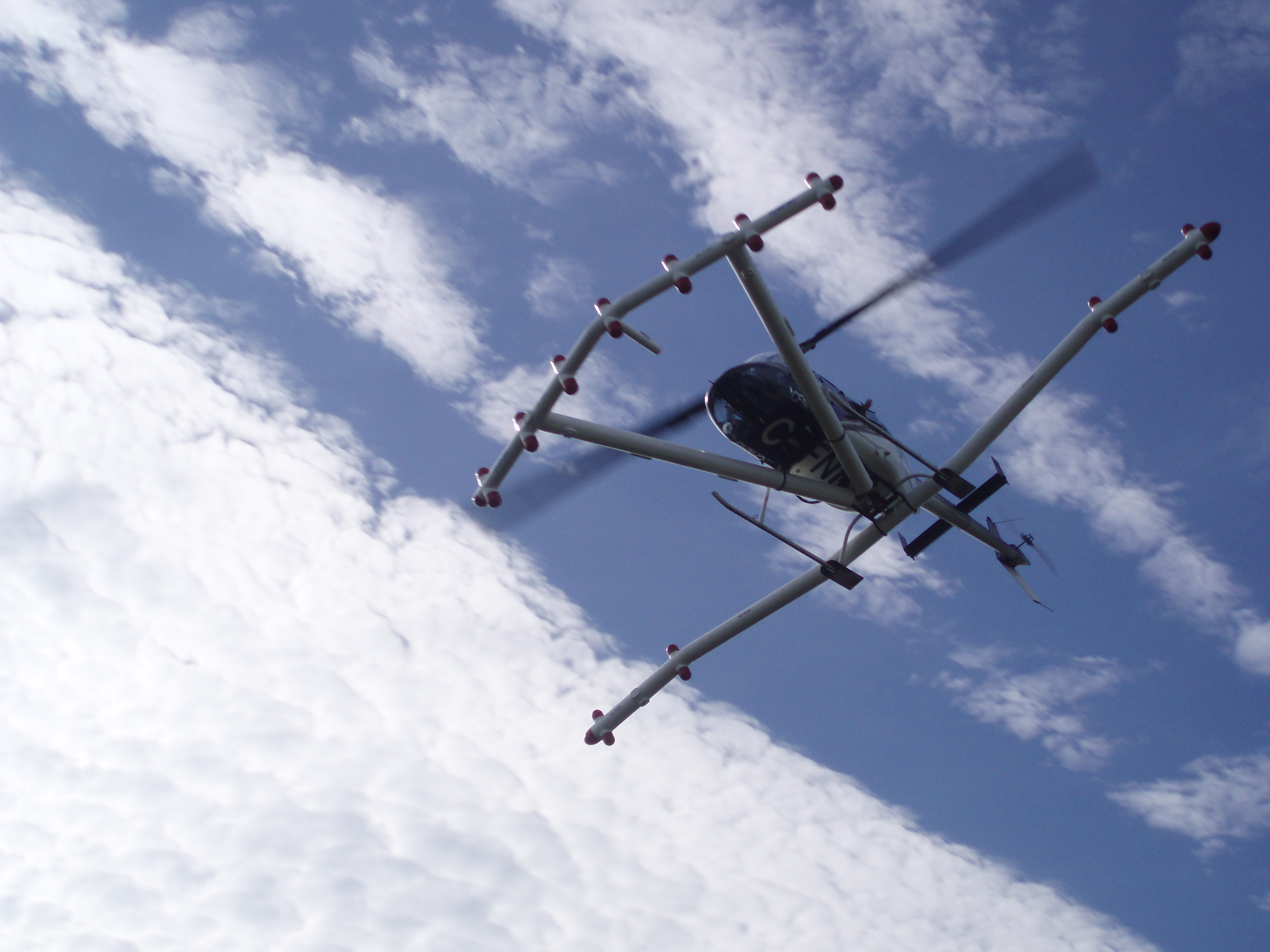
This helicopter is equipped with a magnetometer array. It flies six feet above ground at speeds of 30 to 40 mph.

Aeromagnetic surveys are also used to perform reconnaissance mapping of unexploded ordnance. The aircraft is typically a helicopter, as the sensors must be close to the ground (relative to mineral exploration) to be effective. Electromagnetic methods are also used for this purpose.

== UAV aeromagnetic survey ==
Recent developments in aeromagnetic surveying include the use of drones. The market of unmanned aerial systems is exponential development, so the arrival of these technologies in some niches was inevitable including geophysical surveys. UAVs have proven to be especially useful for mineral exploration, detection and identification. It is also possible to detect Unexploded Ordnance objects using a drone-mounted magnetometer.

== See also ==
- Geophysics
- Exploration geophysics
- Remote sensing
- Mineral exploration
