= McArthur Basin =

Geologic depression in northern Australia

Coordinates: 15.7900°S 134.8400°E

The McArthur Basin is a large intracratonic sedimentary basin in northern Australia, with an exposed area of about 180,000 km^{2}. Most of it lies within the northeastern Northern Territory, but extends over the border into the state of Queensland. The basin contains thick (locally up to 12 km) marine and non-marine sedimentary rocks which were deposited from the late Paleoproterozoic to the early Mesoproterozoic (1800–1430 Ma). The basin also contains some volcanic rocks and related intrusive igneous rocks. The McArthur Basin hosts the world-class McArthur River mine (HYC) zinc-lead-silver deposit (not to be confused with McArthur River mine in Canada) and several smaller mineral and diamond deposits.
