= Impact structure =

Geologic structure formed from impact on a planetary surface

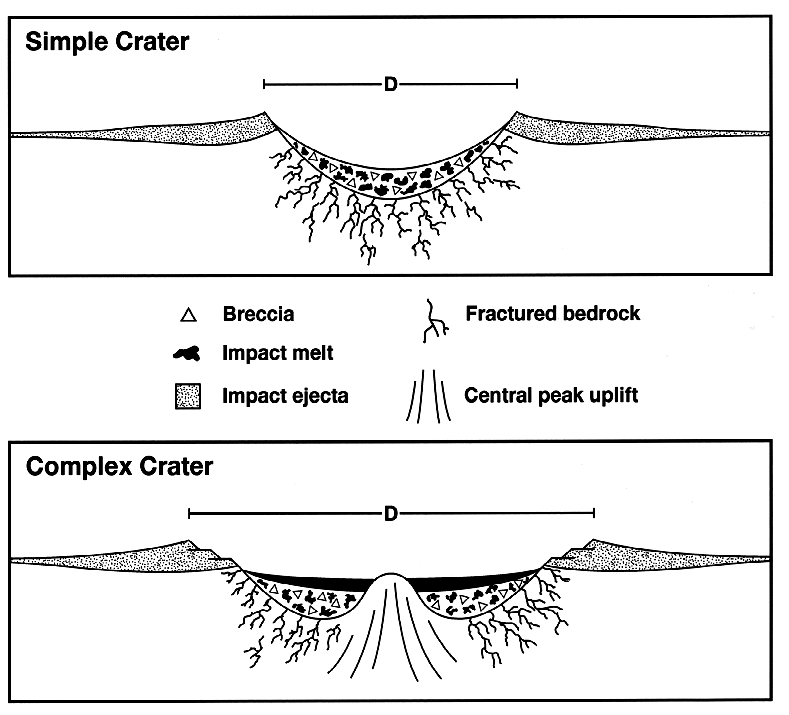
Impact crater structure

An impact structure is a generally circular or craterlike geologic structure of deformed bedrock or sediment produced by impact on a planetary surface, whatever the stage of erosion of the structure. In contrast, an impact crater is the surface expression of an impact structure. In many cases, on Earth, the impact crater has been destroyed by erosion, leaving only the deformed rock or sediment of the impact structure behind. This is the fate of almost all old impact craters on Earth, unlike the ancient pristine craters preserved on the Moon and other geologically inactive rocky bodies with old surfaces in the Solar System. Impact structure is synonymous with the less commonly used term astrobleme meaning "star wound".

In an impact structure, the typical visible and topographic expressions of an impact crater are no longer obvious. Any meteorite fragments that may once have been present would be long since eroded away. Possible impact structures may be initially recognized by their anomalous geological character or geophysical expression. These may still be confirmed as impact structures by the presence of shocked minerals (particularly shocked quartz), shatter cones, geochemical evidence of extraterrestrial material or other methods.

== See also ==
- Complex crater
- Earth Impact Database
- Multi-ringed basin
- Impact event
- List of craters in the Solar System
- List of largest craters in the Solar System
- List of impact structures on Earth
- List of possible impact structures on Earth
- Traces of Catastrophe book from Lunar and Planetary Institute - comprehensive reference on impact crater science
- Peak ring
