= Shocked quartz =

Form of the mineral quartz, found in nuclear test sites and meteor impact zones

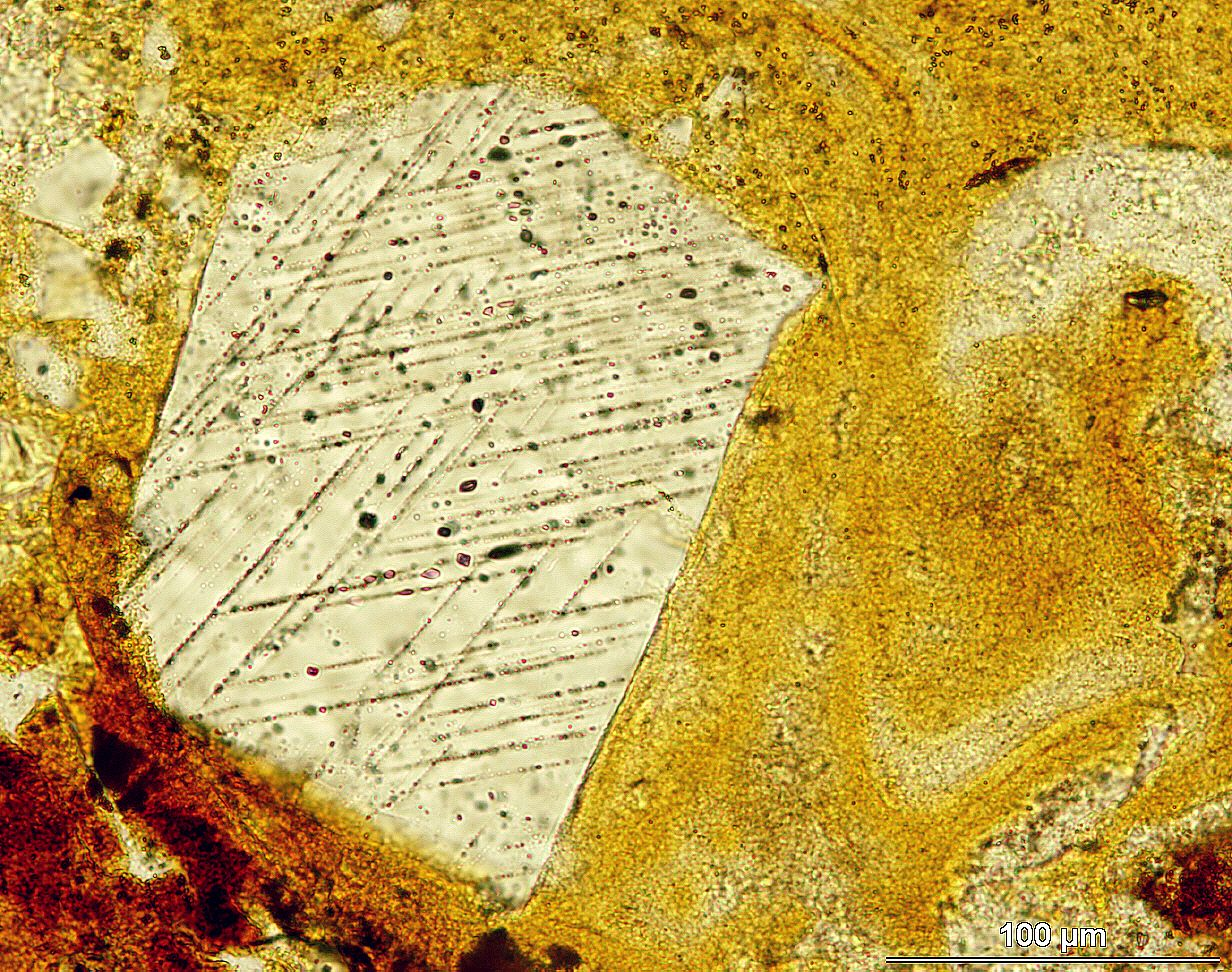
Photomicrograph of shocked quartz

Shocked quartz is a form of quartz that has a microscopic structure that is different from normal quartz. Under intense pressure (but limited temperature), the crystalline structure of quartz is deformed along planes inside the crystal. These planes, which show up as lines under a microscope, are called planar deformation features (PDFs), or shock lamellae.

== Discovery ==
Shocked quartz was discovered following underground nuclear weapons testing, which generated the intense pressures required to alter the quartz lattice. Eugene Shoemaker showed that shocked quartz is also found inside craters created by meteor impact, such as the Barringer Crater and Chicxulub crater. The presence of shocked quartz supports that such craters were formed by impact, because a volcanic eruption would not generate the required pressure.

Lightning is now known to contribute to the surface record of shocked quartz grains, complicating identification of hypervelocity impact features.

== Formation ==
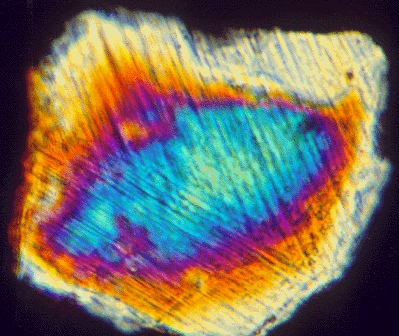
Photomicrograph of a shocked quartz grain (0.13 mm across) from the Chesapeake Bay impact crater, showing shock lamellae

Shocked quartz is usually associated in nature with two high-pressure polymorphs of silicon dioxide: coesite and stishovite. These polymorphs have a crystal structure different from standard quartz. This structure can be formed only by intense pressure (more than 2 gigapascals), but at moderate temperatures. Coesite and stishovite are usually viewed as indicative of impact events or eclogite facies metamorphism (or nuclear explosion), but are also found in sediments prone to lightning strikes and in fulgurites.

== Occurrence ==
Shocked quartz is found worldwide, and occurs in the thin Cretaceous–Paleogene boundary layer, which occurs at the contact between Cretaceous and Paleogene rocks. This is further evidence (in addition to iridium enrichment) that the transition between the two geologic periods was caused by a large impact.

Lightning also generates planar deformation features in quartz and is capable of propagating appropriate pressure/temperature gradients in rocks and sediments alike. This very common mechanism may significantly contribute to the accumulation of shocked quartz in the geologic record. Mantle xenoliths and sediments derived from them may contain coesite or stishovite.

Though shocked quartz is only recently recognized, Eugene Shoemaker discovered it prior to its crystallographic description in building stones in the Bavarian town of Nördlingen, derived from shock-metamorphic rocks, such as breccia and pseudotachylite, of Ries crater.

== See also ==
- Lechatelierite
- Seifertite
- Shatter cone
