= Shatter cone =

Geological feature in bedrock resulting from extreme mechanical shock

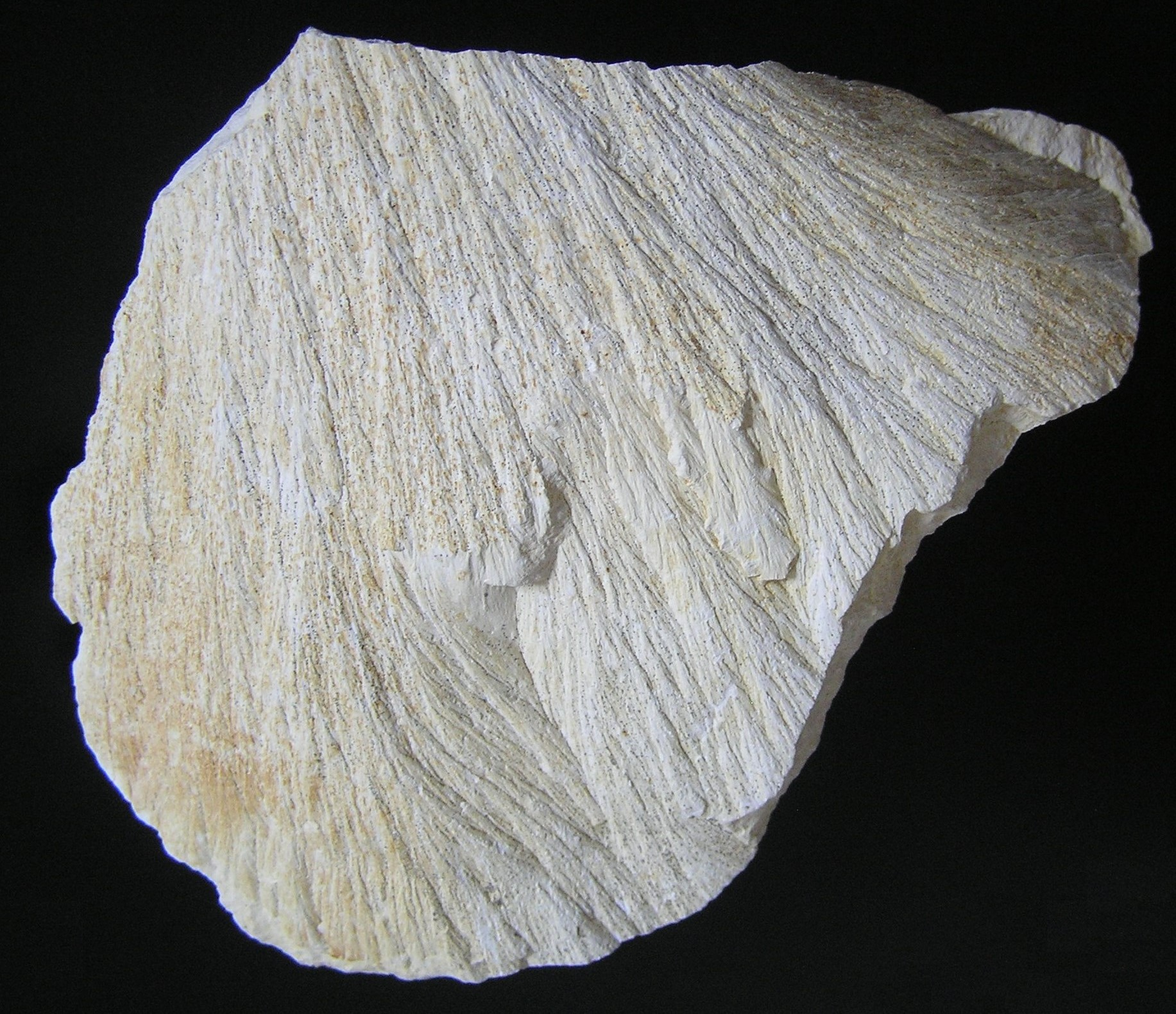
Shatter cone from the Steinheim Basin (type locality), Germany

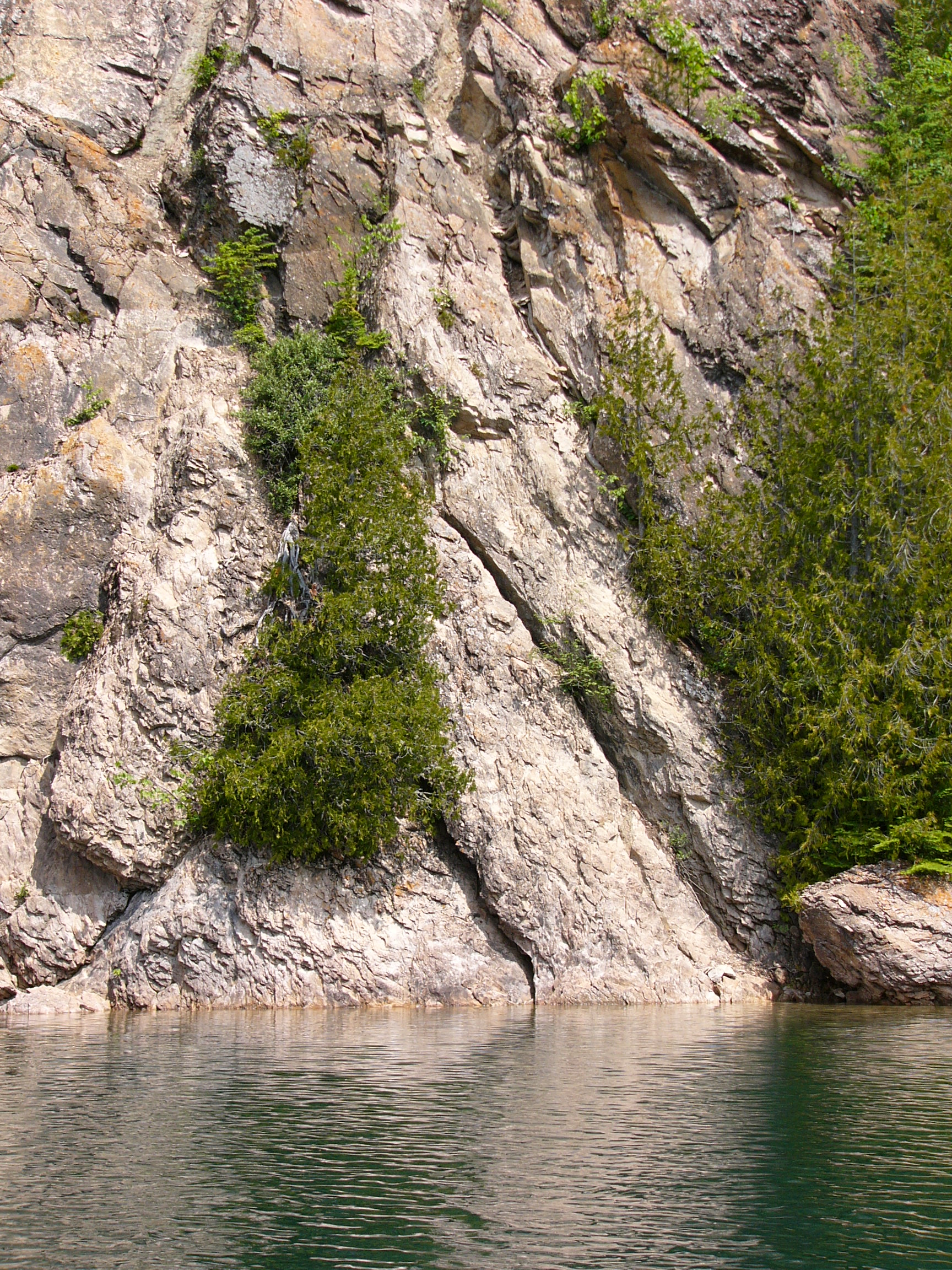
Largest shatter cone registered, more than 9m in height, Slate Islands, Terrace Bay, Ontario, Canada

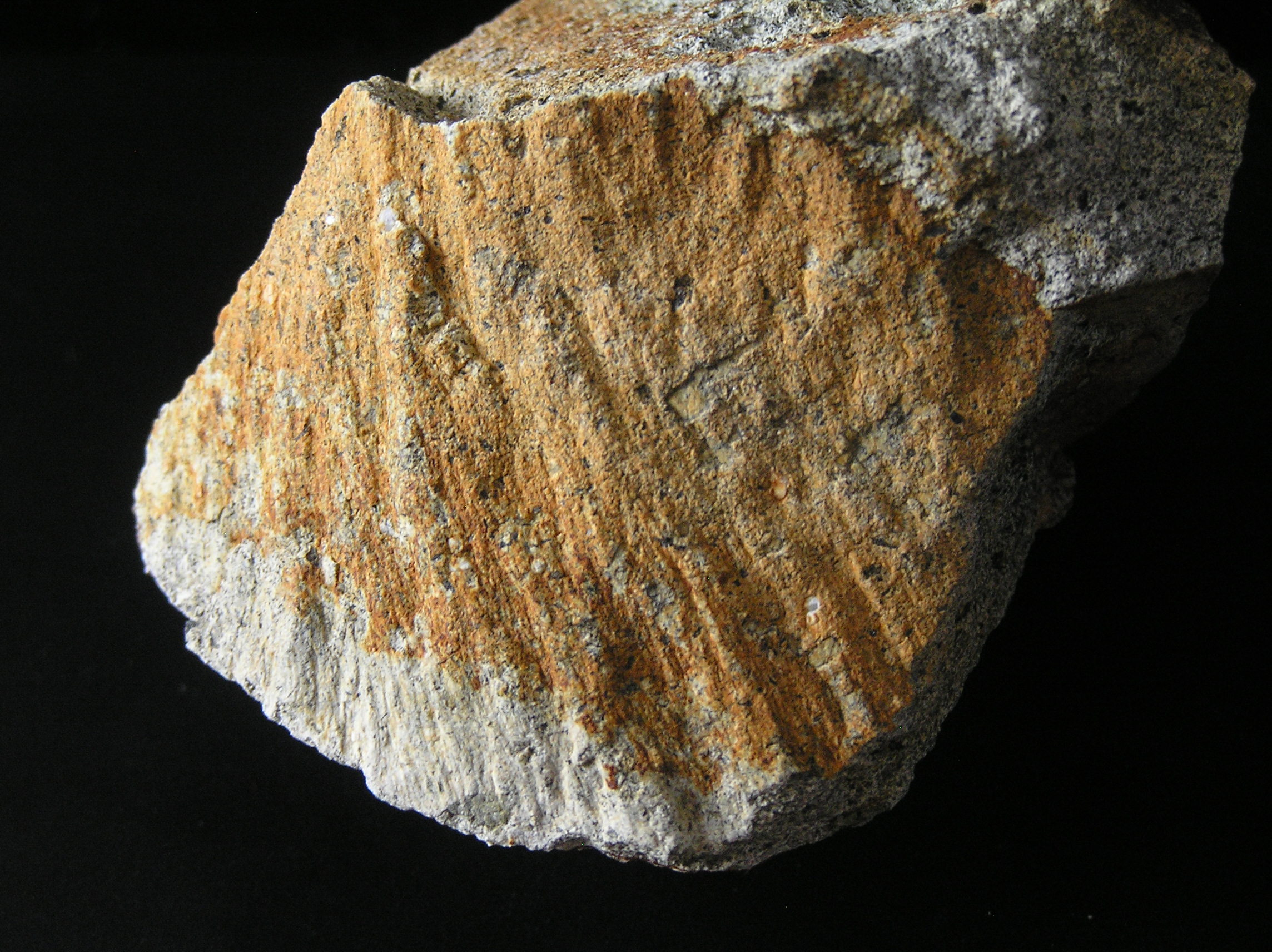
Typical shatter cone from Ries impact crater, Germany

Shatter cones are rare geological features that are only known to form in the bedrock beneath meteorite impact craters or underground nuclear explosions. They are evidence that the rock has been subjected to a shock with pressures in the range of 2–30 GPa (290,000–4,350,000 psi).

== Morphology ==
Shatter cones have a distinctively conical shape that radiates from the top (apex) of the cones repeating cone-on-cone in large and small scales in the same sample. Sometimes they have more of a spoon shape on the side of a larger cone. In finer-grained rocks such as limestone, they form an easily recognizable "horsetail" pattern with thin grooves (striae).

Coarser grained rocks tend to yield less well developed shatter cones, which may be difficult to distinguish from other geological formations such as slickensides. Geologists have various theories of what causes shatter cones to form, including compression by the wave as it passes through the rock or tension as the rocks rebound after the pressure subsides. The result is large and small branching fractures throughout the rocks.

Shatter cones can range in size from microscopic to several meters. The largest known shatter cone in the world (more than 10 metres in length) is located at the Slate Islands in Terrace Bay, Ontario, Canada. The azimuths of the cones' axes typically radiate outwards from the point of impact, with the cones pointing upwards and toward the center of the impact crater, although the orientations of some of the rocks have been changed by post-cratering geological processes at the site.

== See also ==
- Breccia
- Coesite
- Lechatelierite
- Shocked quartz
- Stishovite
