= List of minerals named Tasmanite =

Tasmanite (in the narrow sense of the word: found in Tasmania) — a polysemantic term from the field of geology and mineralogy. The term originally appeared in 1864–1865, when Professor A. H. Church carried out a series of studies in several oil shale deposits on the banks and in the vicinity of the Mersey River (northern Tasmania), collected samples and made analyzes, based on the results of which the sedimentary rock was first described called tasmanite, and a year later the mineral of the same name appeared.

== Basic minerals and rocks ==
- Tasmanite or tasmanian australites are a regional Tasmanian form of australites, the most common type of tektite, a glass of meteoritic origin, traditionally named after its geographic location.
- Tasmanite is the name by which Darwin glass, tektite-impactite, discovered in the southwest of Tasmania, was known until the mid-1970s.
- Tasmanite is a sedimentary rock, a marine oil shale, mainly composed of the fossilized single-celled green algae Tasmanites. Found predominantly in southern Tasmania in coastal areas.
- Tasmanite or «tasmanian amber» is one of the local names for a red-brown translucent mineral, described in 1865, similar to amber.
- Tasmanites (Latin: Tasmanites; Newton, 1875), sometimes also Tasmanitidae or Tasmanaceae — a genus of fossil (extinct) unicellular green algae; Tasmanites deposits form the Tasmanite rock throughout the world and are often associated with shale or petroleum source rock complexes.
- Tasmanite, earthen tar (German: Erdpech, albertite, kerite) — is one of the regional names for tasmanian bitumen, a semi-liquid fraction released by Tasmanian oil shale.

== Gallery ==
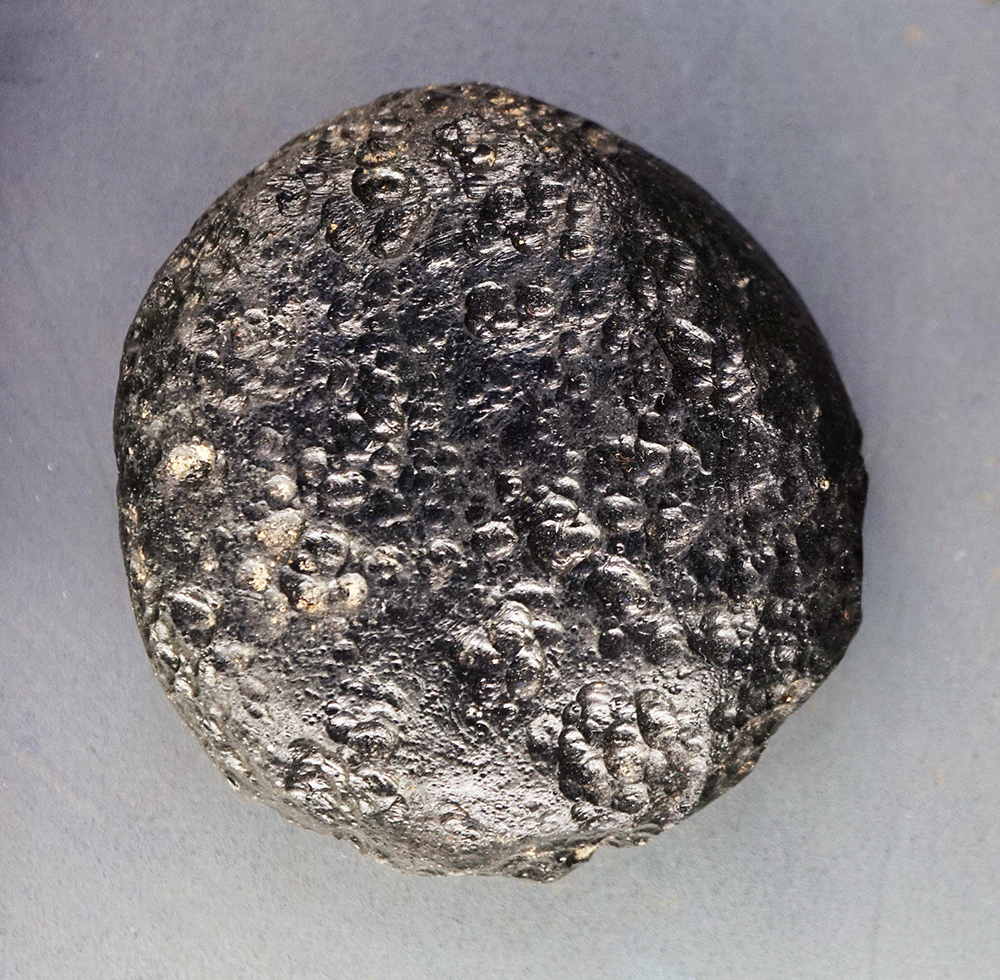
Tasmanite
(tektite)

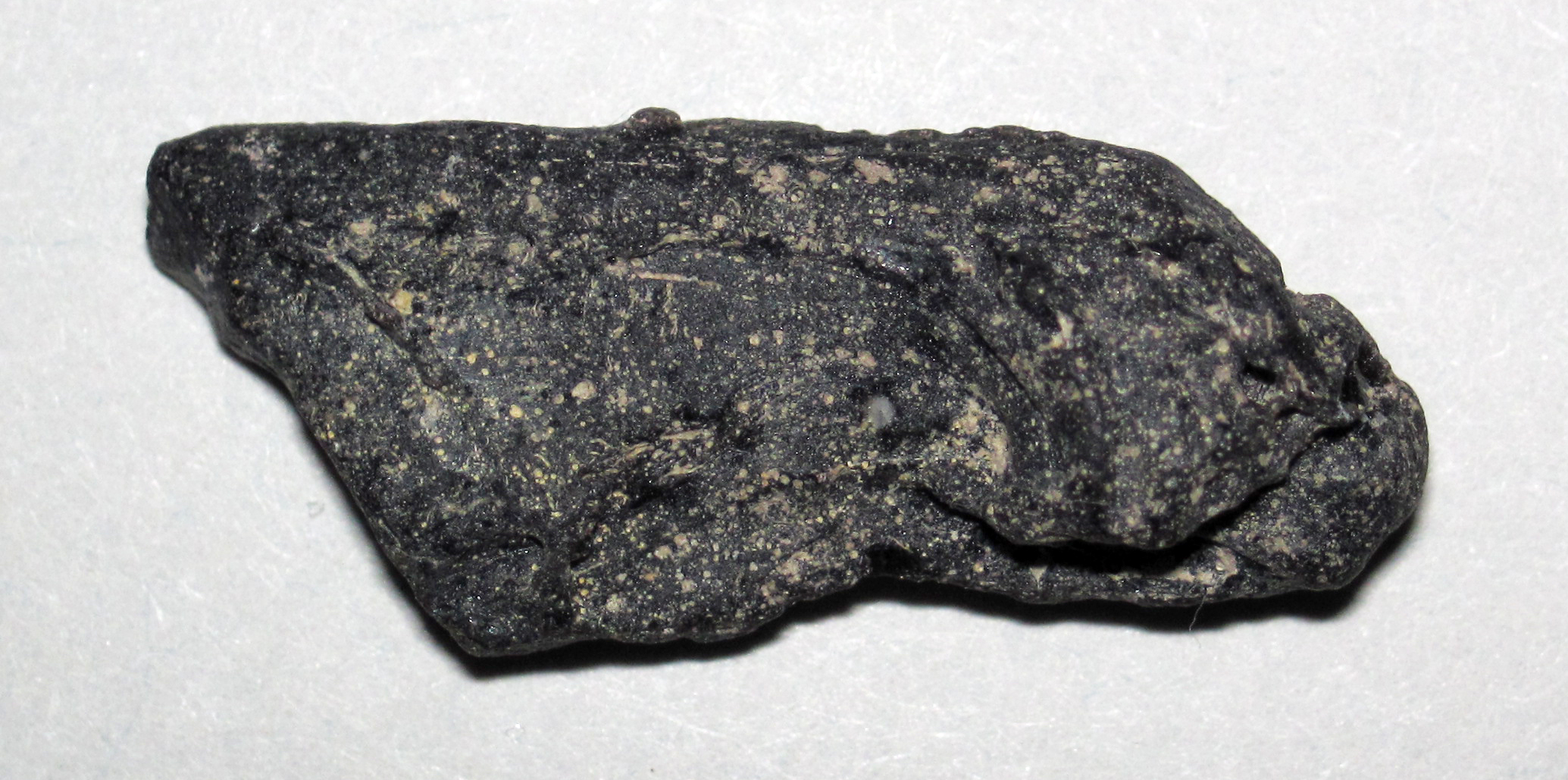
Tasmanite
(Darwin glass)

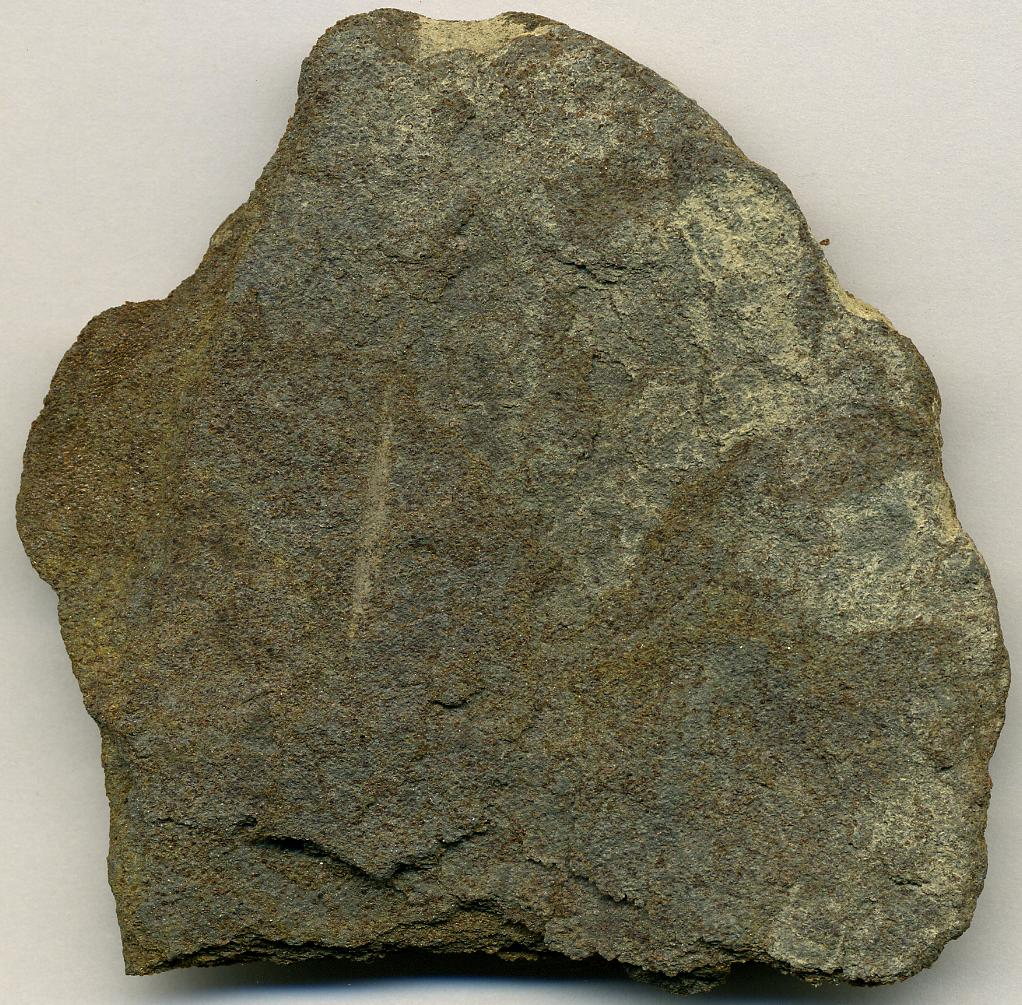
Tasmanite
(oil shale)

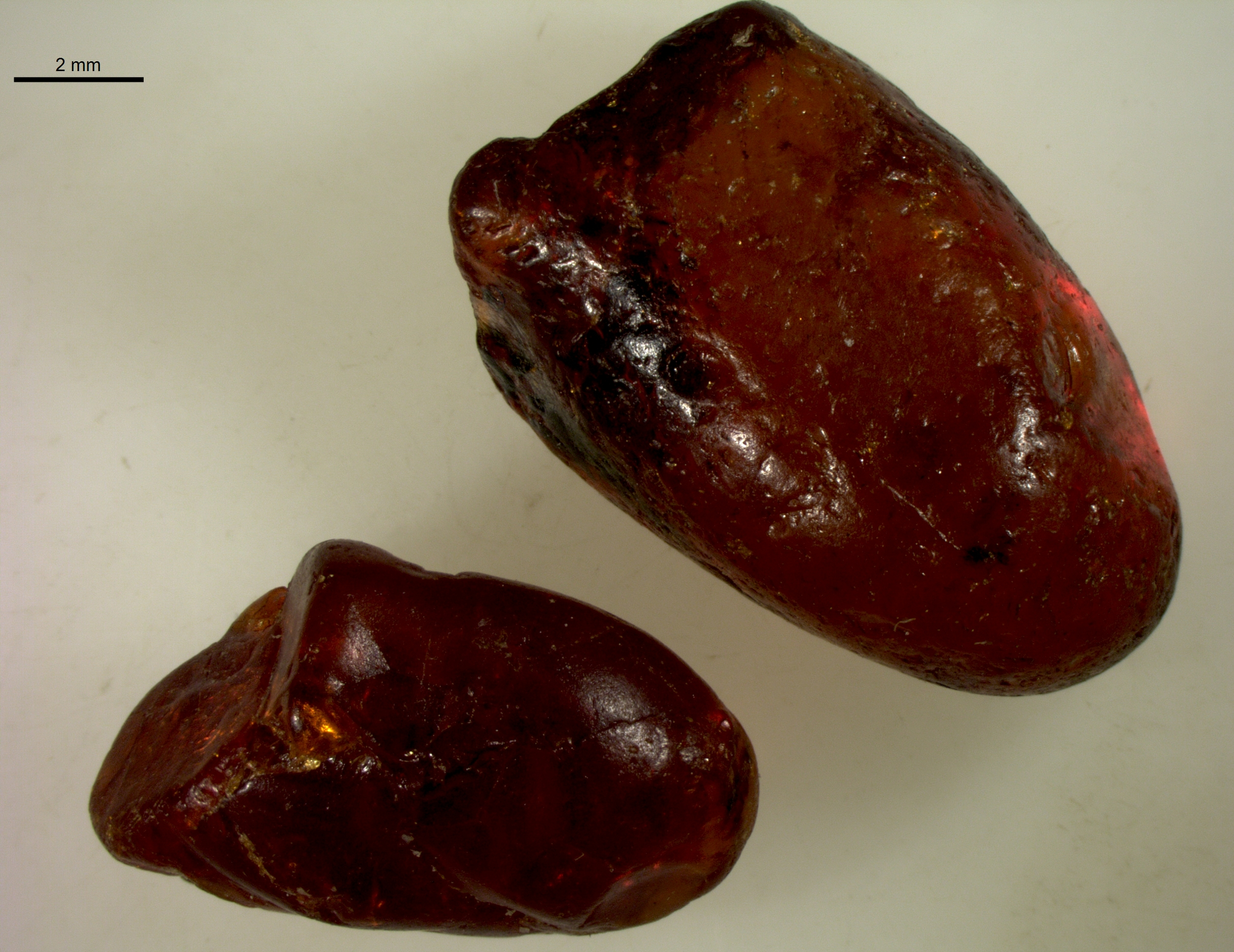
Tasmanite
(amber)

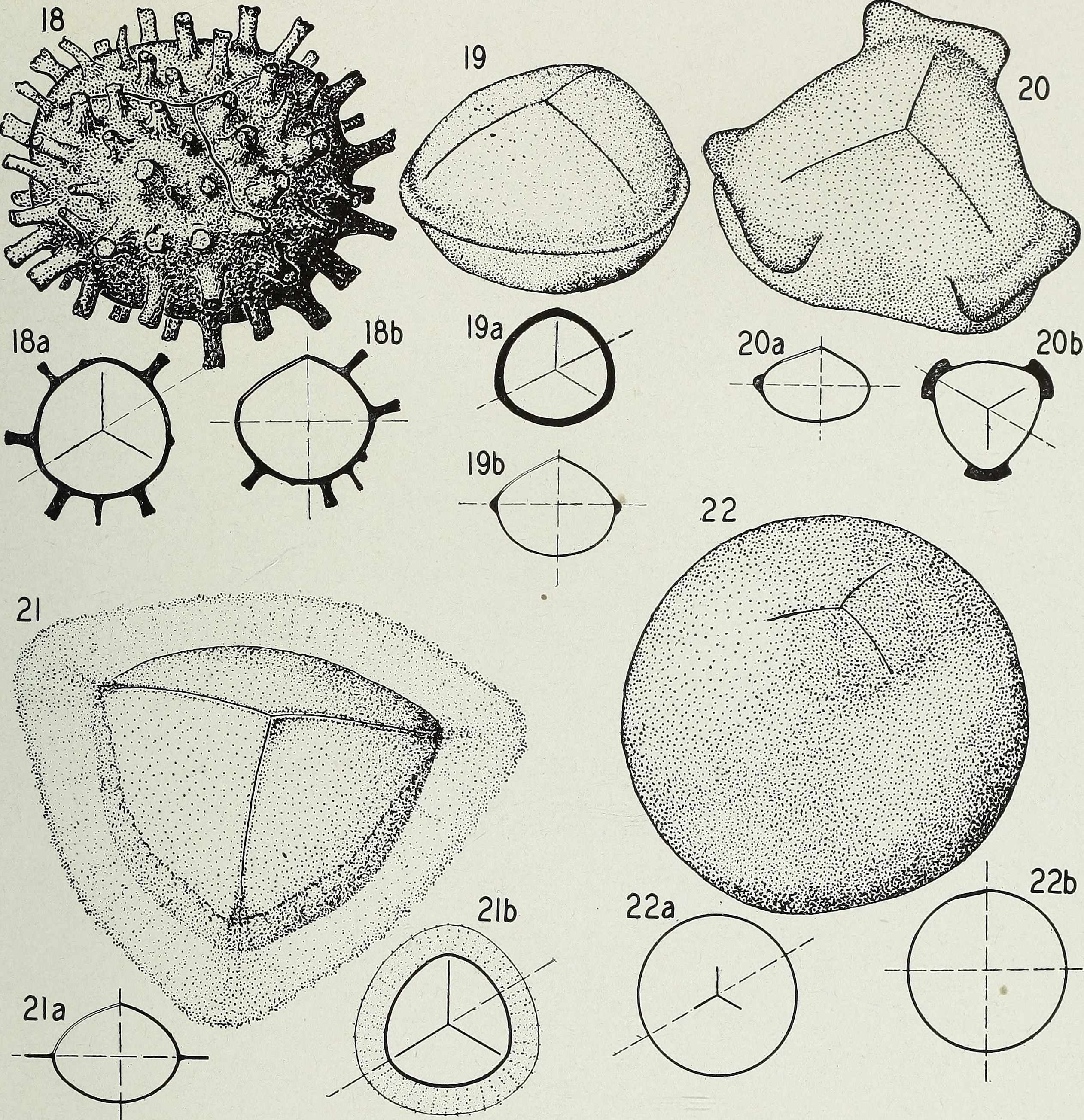
Tasmanites
(unicellular algae)

== See also ==
- Tasmania (disambiguation)
- Tasmannia
- Queenstown, Tasmania
- Tasman Bridge
- Tasmanian Wilderness World Heritage Area
- Tasman Peninsula
- Aboriginal Tasmanians
