= Tasmanite (tektite) =

Metamorphic rock; black tektite from the island of Tasmania

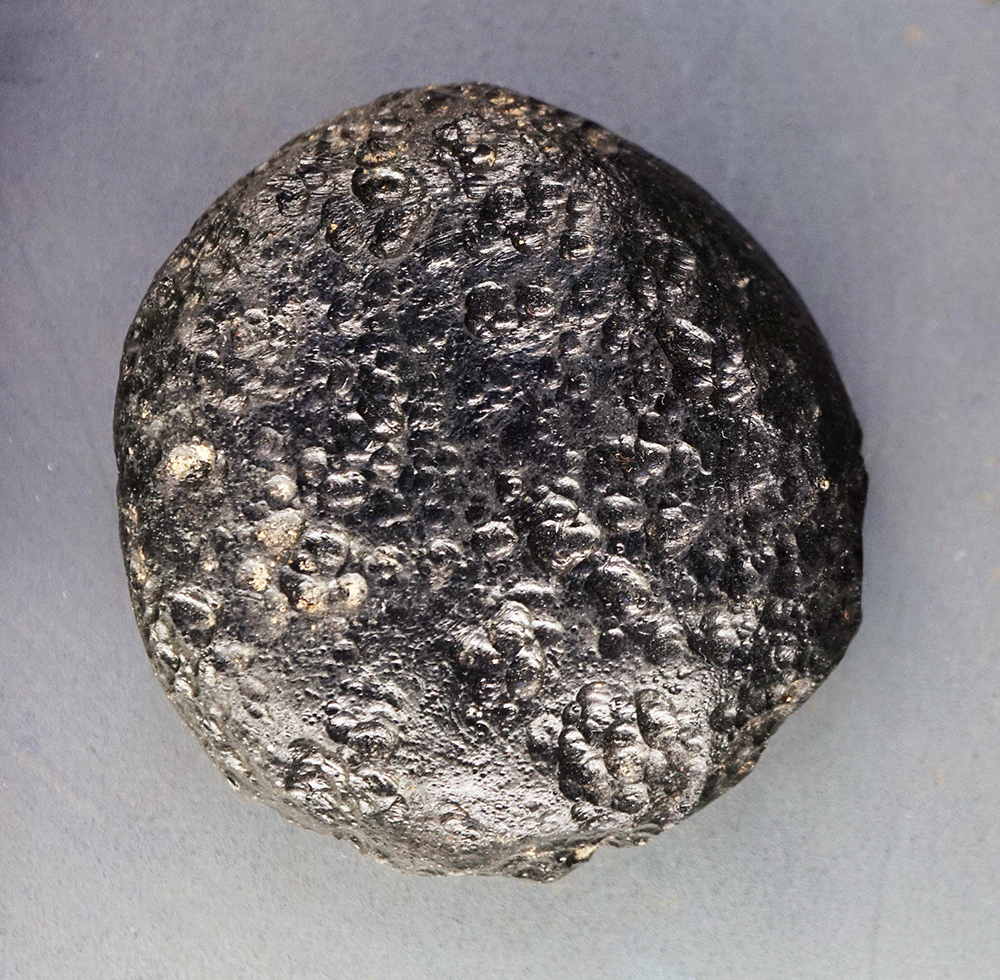
Australite-tasmanite specimen

Tasmanite are tektites found in Tasmania, a regional form of australite, the most common type of tektite, glass of meteorite origin, traditionally named for its geographic location. Quite often, tasmanites are found in the literature under the name australites (from Tasmania), together with which they are included in a very broad category of tektites, originating from the largest Australasian tektite strewnfield on earth. In the northern part of the scatter field, australites partially overlap and connect with part of the range of indochinites, and on the southern border they are present under the name tasmanites. In general, all of the listed regional tektites are included in the general class of indochinites-australites, sometimes referred to under the summary name Australasian tektites.

Under normal lighting, tasmanites are most often opaque and have a dark brown, brownish-greenish or almost dull black color. Among the general part of tasmanites belonging to the southern branch of australites, there are varieties of regular “aerodynamic" shape (sometimes in the form of a small bowl), disc-shaped or hollow balls. In some specimens, the correct form has a man-made appearance, creating the impression of artificial origin.

In addition to the regional part of the australite scatter field, Tasmanites also include purely local tektites, characteristic exclusively of certain regions of Tasmania. Tasmanites were found in considerable quantities in an area of about 410 km² south of Queenstown in the vicinity of Mount Darwin and were called "Darwin glass". According to calculations (approximate quantity per unit of territory), the total weight of this variety of tasmanites should have been several thousand tons.

== History of the study ==
Unlike other regional forms of impact tektites, Australian meteorite glass has much more diverse forms, among which there are samples that even at first glance give the impression of man-made or high-tech objects. After the completion of the colonization of Australia, this circumstance attracted increased attention to them, making them an object of collecting and souvenir sale, and, starting from the mid-19th century, of professional study.

...tektites were found in gold placers and other places on the Australian mainland, which amazed scientists with their unusual shape. Some of them resembled buttons, others were surprisingly similar to mushrooms, and others were like hourglasses. There were also hollow glass balls the size of an apple with a wall thickness of only 1 millimeter, as if some joker had blown some semblance of a soap bubble from natural glass!

In January–February 1836, during his voyage around the world on the Beagle, Charles Darwin personally collected tektite samples during stops in South Australia and Tasmania. A hundred years later they were called australites and tasmanites. Darwin spent just over two weeks in Australia. On February 5, 1836, the Beagle arrived in Storm Bay and spent more than two days in the port of Hobart (in the southeast of the island). During his brief stay in Tasmania and South Australia, Darwin partly acquired and partly collected a small collection of local black glass. He can rightfully be considered a collector and systematizer of the most extensive field of tektites – Australasian.

When the Beagle dropped anchor off the coast of Tasmania, Darwin, setting off on another excursion inland, unexpectedly discovered on the ground hollow balls of black glass, little larger than a walnut. After carefully examining them, he mistook them for volcanic bombs. However, there were no volcanoes nearby. This was confirmed by special geological routes. It remains to be assumed that the balls were brought here by nomadic natives. Darwin made an entry in his diary, but later did not return to this issue.

The Tasmanian discovery of black glass balls occurred in February 1836. Just at this time, the debate about the origin of moldavites, the only tektites known at that time, was in full swing in the Central European scientific world. However, Darwin knew nothing about this scientific discussion, as well as about the various versions and assumptions of Czech and German scientists. It is for this reason that the newly discovered Tasmanian tektites did not attract much attention from the scientist. Considering black glasses to be a purely geological object formed in the bowels of the earth, Darwin characterized them as a kind of "volcanic bomb", thrown out from the craters of volcanoes during an eruption. At the end of the 19th century, australites often became known as "obsidian bombs" or "negro buttons".

In 1857, Charles Darwin also received several samples of natural black glass from the collection of Thomas Mitchell. Darwin, based on the similarity of the studied samples with obsidian, concluded that australites (tasmanites) are of volcanic origin.

Important studies that sharply increased the interest of the scientific community in tektites were the generalizing theoretical works of the Austrian geologist, Professor Eduard Suess. While studying moldavites, in 1900 he put forward a version of their meteorite nature, and the term tektites came into scientific use. Using the example of the only European tektites, which were Czech fossil glasses, Suess, without chemical analysis, came to the conclusion that they were of cosmic origin and were not related to the surrounding geological rocks. The basis for the conclusion was a visual comparison of several groups of samples of various minerals, including ferruginous meteorite fragments.

One of the first scientists to study australites was Charles Fenner, who first encountered these tektites in 1907. He concluded that australites are of cosmic origin and are by nature fragments of glass meteorites.

Almost all assumptions and scientific conclusions made regarding australite-indochinites are directly related to tasmanites, the main part of which belongs to a single Australo-Tasmanian dispersion arc, and only isolated southwestern tektites from the Darwin Crater are of purely local origin.

== Mineral source ==
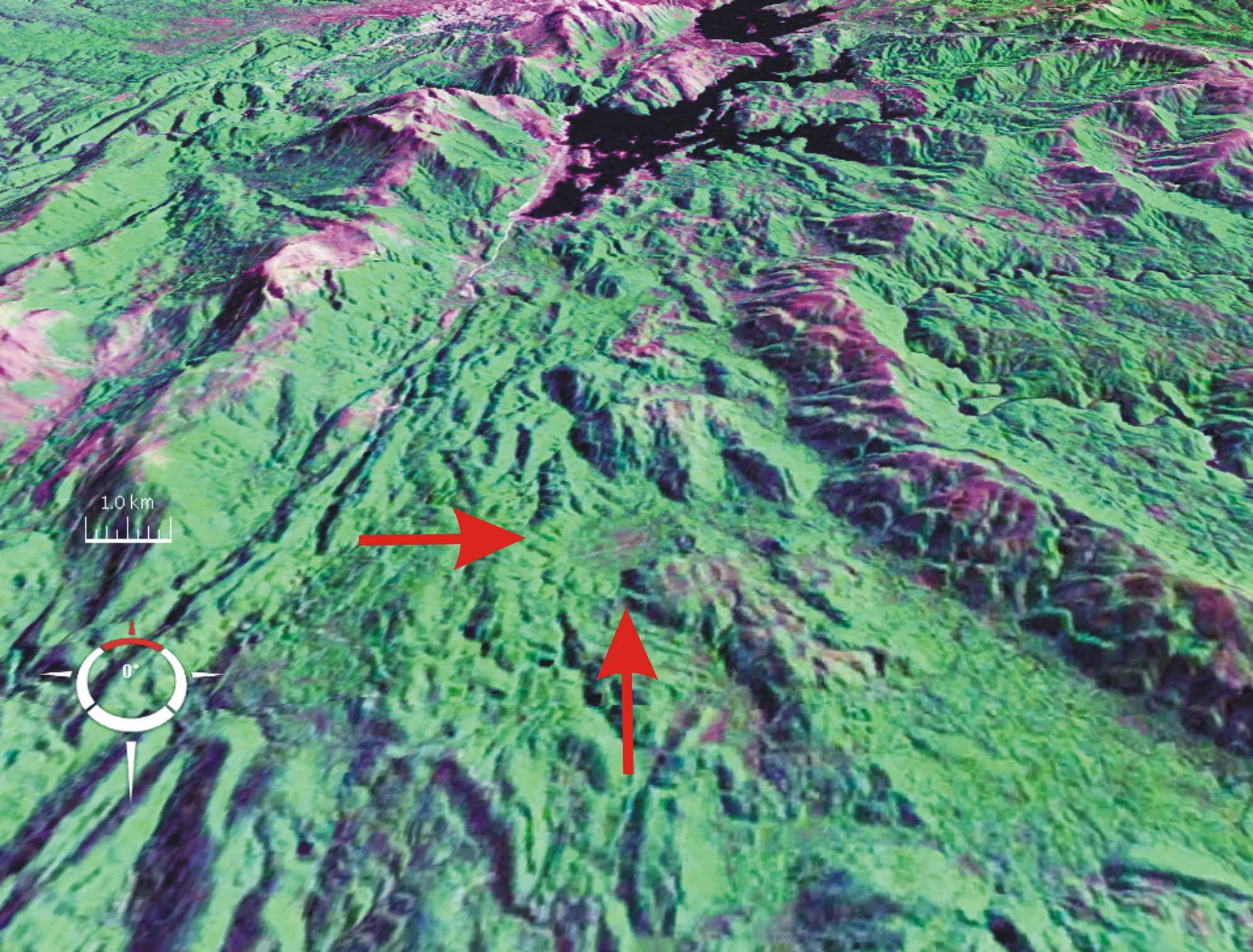
Darwin Crater, one of the sources of tektites in Tasmania

The Australasian tektite belt has an elongated ″S″-shape and is the largest on Earth both in terms of dispersion area and in the number of tektite samples found. In Australia alone, along with the island of Tasmania, several million particles of these glasses were collected. They were discovered and raised even from the bottom of the Indian and Pacific oceans.

Early versions of the origins of the Australites were based on terrestrial versions. The most common explanations for the appearance of black fused glass were volcanoes, as well as forest fires, which are common in Australia. There was also a hypothesis about the fulgurite origin of australites, as a result of a lightning strike into sand or sandy (quartz) rocks.

A new hypothesis about the origin of australites arose in the late 1960s based on data received from the American Surveyor 7 spacecraft, which landed in 1968 near the Tycho crater. The samples of lunar soil he took in this area turned out to be close in chemical composition to tektites, namely australites. This led to the emergence of a version of the lunar origin of the Australasian tektite field. The new theory, in particular, made it possible to explain the bizarre shape of the area within which the main finds of australites took place. A fairly clear S-shaped stripe of the dispersion field stretched from Madagascar through Australia and Indochina (indochinites) to the Philippines (philippinites).

Professor D. Chapman of the Ames Research Center (Mountain View, California) was able to prove using computer programming that only the stream of glass splashes ejected from the Tycho crater during the eruption, combined with the rotation of the Earth, could create a scattering streak such an unusual shape. Moreover, part of the jet should have splashed out onto the surface of the Moon, and left a bright trace on it, visible from the earth, the "Ross ray", which goes from the Tycho crater for thousands of kilometers and passes through the small Ross crater along the way.

A separate problem for researchers was the estimated age of the australites. According to the surrounding layer of sedimentary rocks, in which australites are found en masse, the age of australites is no more than ten thousand years. According to these data, Australasian and African tektites are the youngest on Earth. Evidence from Aboriginal people in Australia and the Ivory Coast indirectly supported these assessments. They traditionally endowed local tektites with magical properties and called them "moon stones", as if in the foreseeable legendary times their ancestors were contemporaries and witnesses of their "fall from the sky." However, data using the potassium-argon dating method gave completely different dates for this grandiose event. According to dozens of different samples, australites fell to Earth about 700 thousand years ago. The discrepancy between the two ages is two orders of magnitude. Regarding radiation measurements, selenologists for a long time could not develop a consensus; chronological estimates had an incredibly inflated appearance, as if the real picture was deliberately distorted by some unaccounted for factor or unknown to modern science. Therefore, in the 1970s, by default, the age of 10 thousand years for the Australites was recognized as more reliable and dated to the known moment of the explosion of the lunar crater Tycho.

However, after a decade and a half, all the contradictions were resolved by themselves, when the lunar theory of the origin of australites was refuted with the help of a more detailed (chemical and radiochemical) analysis of lunar rocks.

Although various versions of the origin of australites are still in circulation, most scientists are inclined to believe that australites were formed and scattered as a result of the collision of a large asteroid or comet with the surface of the Earth. As a result of a powerful explosion, many hot particles were thrown into the stratosphere, including glass particles containing a large amount of impurities: a mixture of planetary soil with meteorite matter. Australites most likely received their streamlined aerodynamic shapes during the secondary re-entry of debris into the Earth's atmosphere, when pieces of glass in a molten state flew at high speed.

To clarify the hypothesis about the cosmic nature of tektites (australites), in 1962 a theoretical assumption was put forward about a giant astrobleme, which became the final point of the Australasian tektite dispersion field. Half a century later, in 2006–2009 in Antarctica (Wilkes Land), according to the results of satellite research, a huge crater hidden under a deep layer of ice, a trace of one of the largest meteorite collisions with the Earth, was discovered in practice. According to scientists, its diameter is about 240 kilometers. This huge crater was at the end point of the australasian-tasmanian arc, which is the main area for tektites in the Southern Hemisphere.

Trying to confirm or refute the cosmic hypothesis of the origin of australites, American physicists Chapman and Larson conducted a series of experiments attempting to artificially form tektites using various forms of ablation. During the experiments, it was possible to reproduce in the smallest detail almost all existing forms of australites, including the disk-shaped one, and to obtain the aerodynamic relief of the rings on the front surface. Based on the results of the first experiments, a positive conclusion was made about the extraterrestrial origin of the australites, but later in repeated studies a reservation was made that it could only be near space, located within the Earth-Moon system.

Most australites have a scattering field in South Australia, rarely rising above 25 degrees latitude. Judging by their similar age and composition, the Australites belong to the southern margin of the largest known Australasian scatter field, extending from Indochina (indochinites) to Tasmania (tasmanites, Darwin glass). In turn, Tasmanites represent the extreme, southeastern point of the range of australites. Outside Tasmania, searches for tektites could be carried out at the bottom of the Pacific Ocean.

The Australasian tektite field is between 610 and 750 thousand years old and may be the result of a major catastrophe on Wilkes Land, as well as a number of smaller regional catastrophes, for example, on the Bolaven Plateau about 790 thousand years ago, which blocked the northern part of the distribution area of australites.

== Mineral properties ==
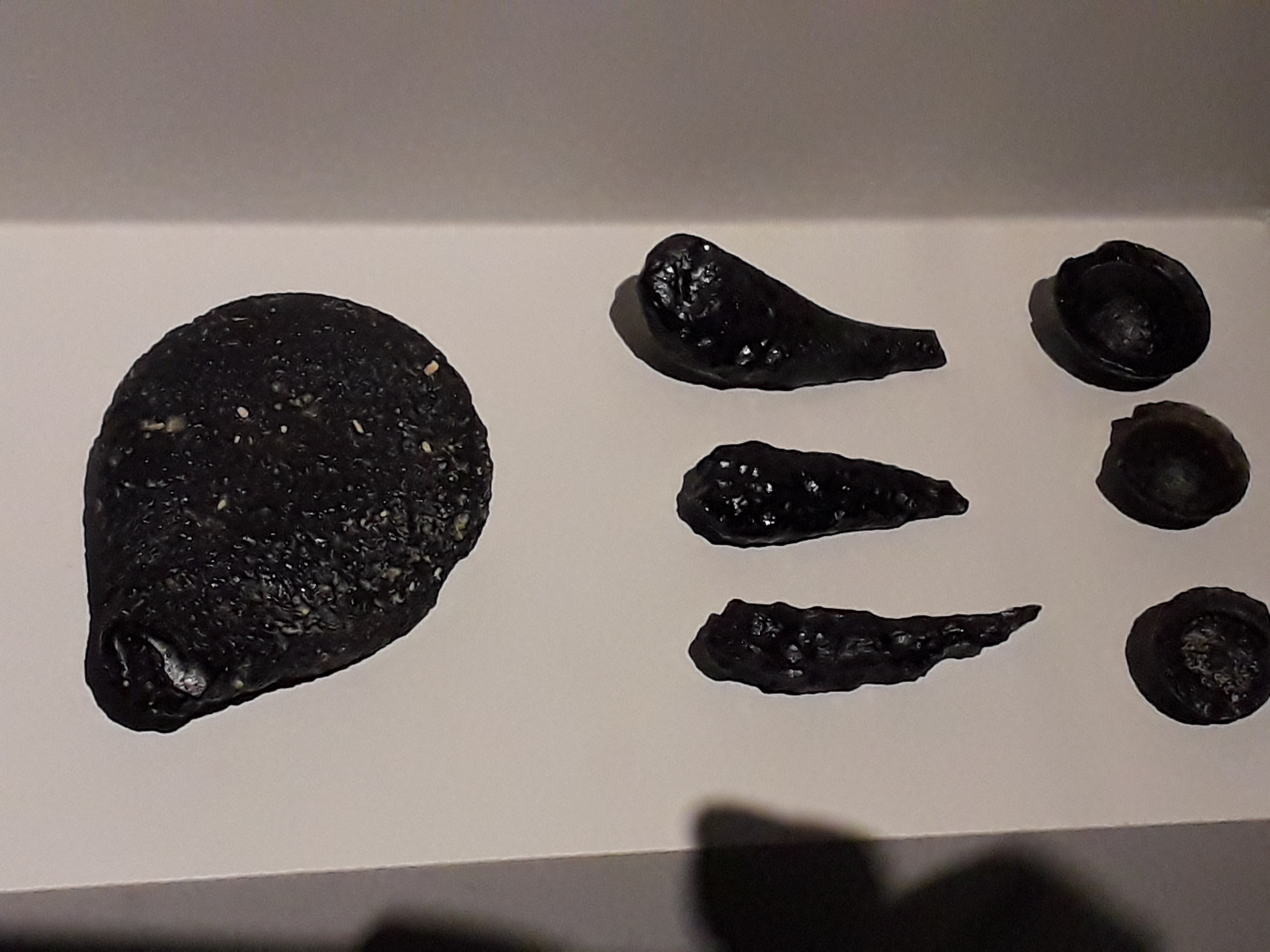
Different forms of australites

Based on their appearance and chemical composition, tasmanites are divided into two clearly differentiated types. The first are among the southern Australians and most often have the following basic shapes: sphere, oval, boat, dumbbell and drop. The second — from among the Darwin glasses – differ both in shape, much more random and fragmentary in nature, and in color – reaching green or even light green, completely uncharacteristic of australites.

Most tektites known on Earth bear obvious traces of passage through the atmosphere (ablations): both on the surface and in shape. This also applies to Australian-Tasmanites. A number of studies of "flange"-shaped samples have shown that exactly such an aerodynamic profile can be obtained from an initial glass sphere invading the earth's atmosphere at cosmic speed. When passing through dense layers, the frontal part of the sphere melts, and the oncoming air flow flattens the sphere, turning it into something like a "button". Other forms of tektites can be explained in a similar way. The greatest difficulty in modeling the situation is the need to distinguish between the effects of terrestrial and cosmic factors, since the surface structure of tektites sometimes seems too complex.

== See also ==
- Australite
- Darwin glass
- Indochinite
- Billitonite
- Bediasite
- Libyan desert glass
- Moldavite
- Tektites
