= George Baker (geologist) =

Australian geologist and educator (1908–1975)

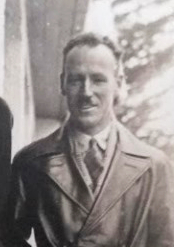
- Baker c. 1930
- Born: 10 October 1908; Coventry, Warwickshire, England
- Died: 25 August 1975 (aged 66); Melbourne, Australia
- Education: University of Melbourne
- Scientific career
- Workplaces: University of Melbourne
- Thesis: (1956)

George Baker (1908–1975) was an Australian mineralogist, geologist, university teacher and researcher based in Melbourne, Victoria in the mid-20th century. His teaching and research work was undertaken through positions at the University of Melbourne, CSIRO and the National Museum of Victoria (now Melbourne Museum).

== Early life ==
Baker was born at Coventry, Warwickshire, England on 10 October 1908. His mother died when he was seven months old and he was first cared for by his aunt, then later was placed under the guardianship of a Quaker solicitor. He won a scholarship to Leominster Grammar School, where he thrived as a scholar and athlete, becoming a school prefect as a senior. Baker migrated to Victoria, Australia in March 1925 at the age of 16 to live with relatives.

== University of Melbourne ==
Baker found work on reaching Melbourne almost immediately, being selected as a junior assistant at the University of Melbourne's Geology School in April 1925. Through the encouragement and patronage of Ernest Willington Skeats, he was permitted to attend lectures and was subsequently admitted to a Bachelor of Science. On graduating, he then completed his master's degree conducting field and laboratory research on the geological properties of the You Yangs to the southwest of Melbourne, through which he became known for "his meticulous thoroughness, his dependability, and his courage in overcoming difficulties."

== Australites ==
Baker's scientific work was concerned with australites, tektites with unique properties found in Australia. These are small bodies composed of black, green, brown, or gray natural glass. While the button-like presentation of many australites fuelled early conjecture about their human-made origins, scientific analysis established these objects are formed from the molten, terrestrial debris ejected during meteorite impacts. Baker's work supported the theory that the "assemblage of shape types discovered is more likely an outcome of natural phenomena than of selective accumulation by Aboriginal man." Indeed, some Aboriginal groups in Western Australia and the Nullarbor Plains directly associated tektites with meteors and cosmic impacts - the "sky stones" were "valuable to Indigenous cultures as surgical tools and implements for use in ritual and ceremony." His work ranged to the "specific gravity relationships" that contributed to the formation of these phenomena.

Baker was recognised for the quality of his research work by the University of Melbourne through award of the David Syme Research Prize in 1944, and was conferred the degree of Doctor of Science (DSc) by the university in 1956.

== Later career ==
Maintaining his base at the University's Geology School, Baker accepted the role of research officer with CSIRO's mineragraphic section, later promoted to of senior principal research scientist by the time of his retirement in 1968. He also maintained a role as honorary associate in mineralogy with the National Museum of Victoria.

Baker's research work on australites, meteorites and petrology in Victoria was published in Australia by the Royal Society of Victoria in its Proceedings and Transactions, by the Museum in its Memoir, and with many international journals including Nature, the American Journal of Science and American Mineralogist. In all, he published 135 papers and monographs.

Baker was a fellow of the Mineralogical Society of America and the Meteoritical Society, a life member of the American Geophysical Union, the Mineralogical Society of Great Britain and Ireland, and the Royal Society of Victoria, and a foundation member of the Geological Society of Australia. He was commissioner for Australia of the International Committee on Meteorites of the International Geological Commission.

Besides being famous for his extensive work on one major 'mystery' topic, teckites, George became the stratigraphic author/founder of a lesser mystery, the Garie Formation in the middle of the Narrabeen Group, Sydney Basin coastal area. This is a quasi-oolitic pelletal claystone at the top of the "chocolate shales" interval of red claystones (Bald Hill Claystone / Collaroy Claystone ) ... which appears to show that something rather dramatic terminated the red claystone deposition - but what? George (Australian Journal of Science, February 1956, page 126) merely noted it as a "transition bed". The nature of the bed has continued to puzzle geologists ever since and is still not solved but it recognition has been extended west to the area around Wentworth Falls in the sparsely "oolitic" Hat Hill Claystone member.

George Baker was the inaugural recipient of the Royal Society of Victoria's Medal for Excellence in Scientific Research, awarded in 1959 on the centenary of the Society's formal foundation.

== Death and legacy ==
George Baker died in Melbourne on 25 August 1975, leaving his extensive collection of 2,500 Victorian tektites to the National Museum of Victoria and a portrait painted by Melbourne artist Orlando Dutton to the Royal Society of Victoria.
