= Dean Roden Chapman =

American scientist and engineer (1922–1995)

Dean Roden Chapman (8 March 1922 – 4 October 1995) was a mechanical engineer at the National Aeronautics and Space Administration (NASA) and at Stanford University.

== Biography ==
He played basketball for the oft-maligned Caltech Beavers men's basketball team while he got a B.S. from Caltech. He began his professional career at Ames Aeronautical Laboratory (now the Ames Research Center) in 1948, where he later became Director of Astronautics. He left government service in 1980 to join the faculty at Stanford University. At the time of his death from cancer at age 73, he was Professor Emeritus of the Department of Aeronautics and the Department of Mechanical Engineering at Stanford University. Chapman was internationally known for his research into fluid dynamics, and for pioneering modern computational fluid dynamics. He is also remembered for his research and controversial theories on the origin of tektites.

== External resources ==
- George S. Springer; Robert T. Jones; Hans Mark; Robert W. MacCormack (23 April 1997). "MEMORIAL RESOLUTION: DEAN R. CHAPMAN". Stanford Report. Archived from the original on 6 July 2007.
- Obituary archive at Stanford University
- Obituary at Lunar Planetary Institute
