= Tasmanites =

Scientific classification
- Domain: Eukaryota
- Clade: Archaeplastida
- Clade: Viridiplantae
- Division: Chlorophyta
- Class: Pyramimonadophyceae
- Order: Pyramimonadales
- Family: Pyramimonadaceae
- Genus: Tasmanites; Newton, 1875

Species
- See text

Synonyms
- Pachysphaera Ostenfeld, 1899

Genus of algae

Tasmanites is a genus of green algae in the order Pyramimonadales extensively found across the globe, particularly in Tasmania and the United States. Tasmanites was once believed to be extinct, but has since been proven identical to the former genus Pachysphaera.

The compressed microspore shells from algae of this genus are known to form the mineral tasmanite. Studies on these shells by Yuri Zhemchuzhnikov show that they are exceptionally homogeneous, leaving a small white ash in the shape of the original sample behind upon combustion.

== Species ==
There are 24 accepted species, listed below:

- Tasmanites annulatus
- Tasmanites balteus
- Tasmanites bobrowskii
- Tasmanites corrugatus
- Tasmanites crassus
- Tasmanites exasperatus
- Tasmanites fissura
- Tasmanites fulgidus
- Tasmanites insignis
- Tasmanites marginatus
- Tasmanites marshalliae
- Tasmanites mirus
- Tasmanites novaguineensis
- Tasmanites porosus
- Tasmanites punctatus
- Tasmanites simplex
- Tasmanites sinuosus
- Tasmanites sommeri
- Tasmanites tenellus
- Tasmanites usitatus
- Tasmanites validus
- Tasmanites vanboekelii
- Tasmanites variabilis
- Tasmanites vindhyanensis

== See also ==
- List of minerals named Tasmanite
