= Charentese amber =

Type of amber

Charentese amber is a type of amber that is found in sediments in the Charente-Maritime area of France. It dates to the late Albian to early Cenomanian stages of the mid-Cretaceous, around 100 million years ago. Charentese amber has been known since the early 19th century and was originally referred to as succin, succinic resin, or retinasphalt. The amber is known for its high quality and preservation of inclusions, such as insects, plant debris and other organisms. It is a valuable resource for paleontologists and other scientists studying the biodiversity of ancient ecosystems. The amber is often, but not always, opaque, requiring the usage of X-ray microtomography in order to observe specimens.

Charentese amber has unique geochemical properties such as high content of succinic acid, and a unique ratio of stable isotopes C13/C12, which make it a valuable tool for geochemical and climatic reconstructions of Cretaceous period.

== See also ==
- List of types of amber
