= List of types of amber =

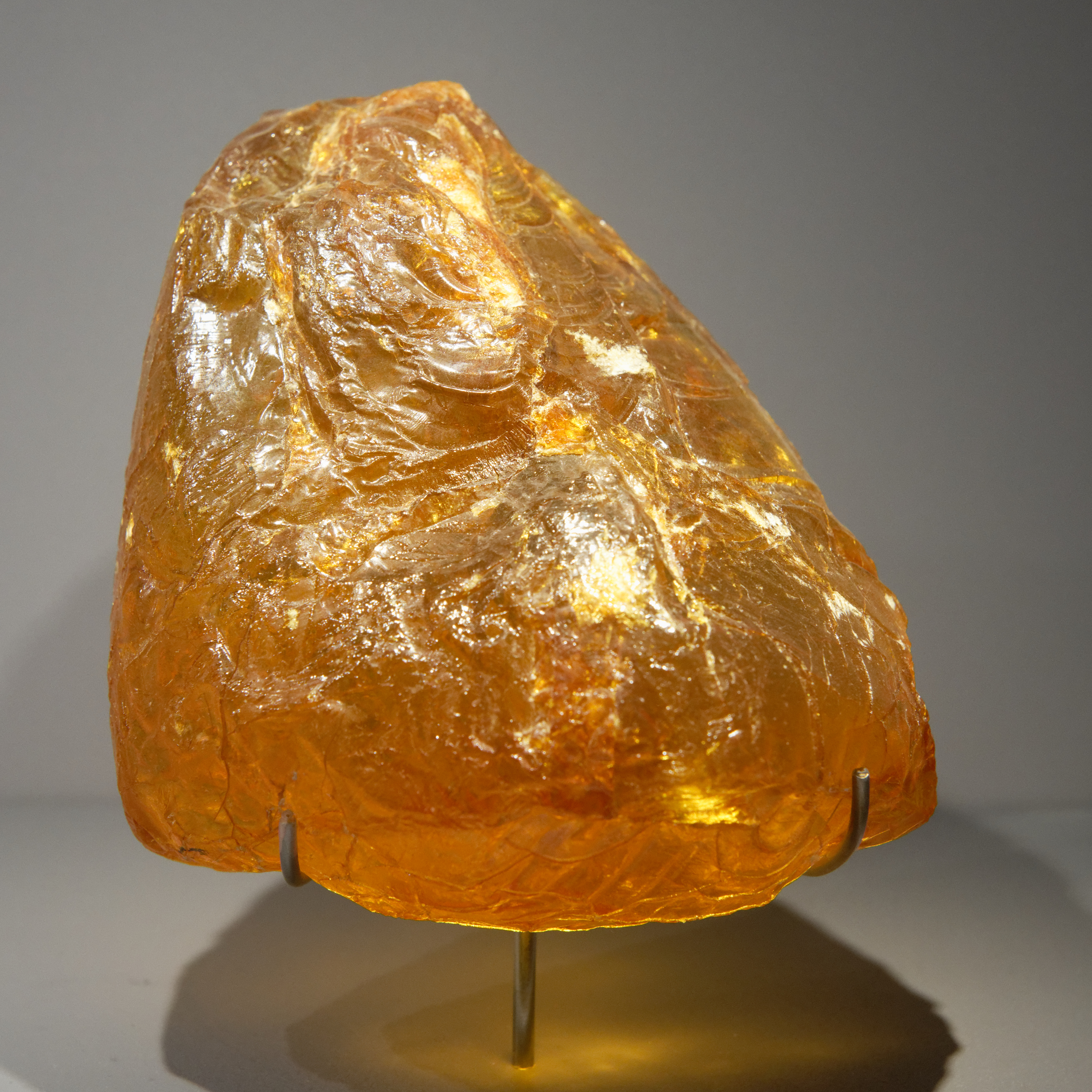
Baltic amber on display at the National Museum of Natural History, France

This is a list of types of amber.

== True ambers ==
- Baltic amber - the most common amber variety, found along the shores of a large part of the Baltic Sea, Eocene age amber.
- Bitterfeld amber, amber from Bitterfeld, Germany, equivalent in age to Baltic amber and has historically been suggested to be synonymous with it
- Bavarian amber - also known as domain amber, from the Bavarian Alps, originally believed to be from the Triassic age, later re-dated to the Cretaceous (Cenomanian) age. Bavarian amber is distinct from Bitterfeld amber.
- Burmese amber - also known as burmite, is a Cretaceous (Cenomanian) age amber about 99 million years old found mainly in the Hukawng Valley, Kachin State, Myanmar (Burma). The most common amber containing insect inclusions of the Cenomanian, mined in a very large amount since late 2010s and became one of the most available types of amber.
- Canadian amber - also known as chemawinite or cedarit, found near Cedar Lake (Manitoba), Cretaceous (Campanian) age amber.
- Charentese amber - opaque amber found in the Aquitaine Basin, France. Cretaceous (Cenomanian) age.
- Cambay amber - amber from Gujarat, India, unlike most ambers readily dissolves in solvents, Eocene age.
- Dominican amber - nearly always transparent, and having a higher number of fossil inclusions than Baltic amber, Miocene age amber.
  - Blue amber - a rare color variation, most commonly is found in the Dominican Republic.
- Ethiopian amber - formerly considered Cretaceous, currently considered Miocene age.
- Fushun amber - amber found near Fushun, China, Eocene age.
- Kuji amber - amber from Kuji, Iwate Prefecture, Japan, considered to be Cretaceous (Santonian) in age.
- Jordanian amber - found in Jordan, considered to be Albian in age.
- Lebanese amber - found in Lebanon, Levant and Jordan, considered to be the oldest amber with significant numbers of inclusions, Early Cretaceous (Barremian).
- Mexican amber - found mainly in Chiapas in Mexico, roughly contemporary with Miocene era Dominican amber, and produced by the extinct Hymenaea mexicana tree, a relative of the Hymenaea protera tree responsible for producing Dominican Amber.
- New Jersey amber - Found on the Atlantic coastal plain of North America, dated to the Cretaceous, Turonian.
- Oise amber - found near Oise in France, Eocene
- Rovno amber - found in the Rivne region of Ukraine, of similar age to Baltic amber (Eocene), and sharing some species.
- Sakhalin amber - amber from Sakhalin, Russia, Eocene in age.
- Spanish amber - amber from Northern and Eastern Spain, Cretaceous (Albian) in age.
- Sri Lankan amber - found in sea coast in a very small quantity also called Indian amber or Indian sea amber.
- Sumatran amber - found in Jambi, Indonesia this amber is a young amber, typically falling in the 20-30 million year age range. It does not often have clear inclusions, and very few insects are found as compared to other ambers.
- Taymyr amber (also spelled Taimyr) - also known as Kara amber (due to being located around the Kara Sea) found in Taymyr Peninsula (northern Russia), Cretaceous (Cenomanian and Santonian) aged amber.
- Tasmanian amber - rare regional mineraloid, a brownish-reddish fossilized organic resin from the island of Tasmania.
- Amber Kay - also known as Kauri gum, found in the Kauri pine forests of New Zealand, it is often a sub-fossil copal, however the Kauri pine is the last descendant of the ancient amber tree, meaning it can undergo the amberisation (trissisation) process allowing it to become amber after millions of years. The oldest piece found was 125 million years old, definitively amber.

== See also ==
- Black amber - aka Oltu stone, actually a type of jet (lignite) found in eastern Turkey.
- Copal - resinous substance in an intermediate stage of polymerization and hardening between "gummier" resins and amber.
- List of minerals

== Literature ==
- Biodiversity of Fossils in Amber from the Major World Deposits / Ed. D. Penney. Siri Scientific Press, 2010. 304 pp
