= Charles Fenner =

Australian geologist, naturalist, geographer, and educator (1884–1955)

Charles Albert Edward Fenner (18 May 1884 – 9 June 1955) was an Australian geologist, naturalist, geographer and educator.

== Early life and education ==
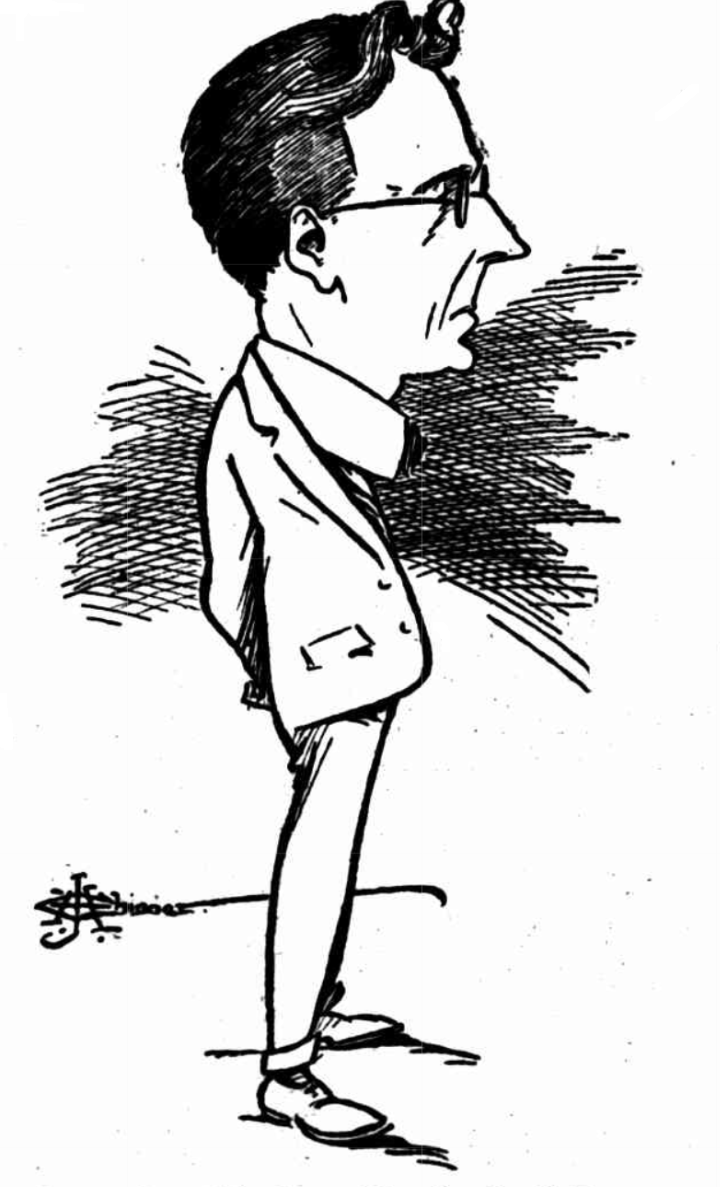
caricature by J. H. Chinner

Fenner was born in the town of Dunach, Victoria (near Ballarat), the fifth child of German-born Johannes Fenner and Mary Fenner, née Thomas, of Adelaide. After leaving school he embarked on an apprenticeship as compositor with the Talbot Leader a local newspaper. He won a scholarship to attend Melbourne Teachers' College, and graduated BSc with Honours and Dip. Ed. in 1913.

== Career ==
Fenner taught at several Victorian schools before being appointed (joint?) principal of the Ballarat School of Mines in November 1914. He also had charge of the school's Geology department, the teaching of which was favorably commented on by examiners. He paid particular attention to field work, which the students enjoyed, as well as being important to their education. Fenner also prepared students for the Geology examinations at Melbourne University, with notable success.

In 1916 he accepted the post of Superintendent of Technical Education in South Australia, a position he held until May 1939, when he was appointed acting Director of Education in place of W. J. Adey who was on the eve of retirement. During that time he completed research work for his D.Sc and from 1929 lectured in geography at the University of Adelaide, and in 1937 went on an extended overseas tour. In September 1939 he succeeded Adey as Director of Education and held that position until 1946, when he retired due to ill health. He worked as a volunteer for the South Australian Museum, pursuing his research into tektites, among other interests, and contributed numbers of articles to Walkabout, until 1954 when he suffered a stroke, and died a year later. His remains were buried in the Centennial Park Cemetery.

== Other interests ==
Fenner was president of the Royal Society of South Australia in 1931, and a member of the board of governors of the Public Library. Most of his spare time was spent in research and on geology excursions. He was particularly interested in australites, small glassy, often button-shaped, objects found on the Nullarbor Plain and elsewhere in southern Australia, believed to be ejecta from a large meteorite that landed in China.

Fenner also wrote articles about science for The Australasian, under his own name and under the pseudonym Tellurian. In a February 1938 article under his own name he displayed an awareness of the theory that carbon dioxide build-up in the atmosphere could lead to a warming of the Earth. Summarising competing theories about glacial periods he wrote "it is suggested that if the air's carbon dioxide content increased greatly it would prevent the radiation of heat and would thus warm the earth. A lessening of the amount of CO_{2} would, in the same way, cause glaciation, according to this theory."

== Recognition and honours ==
- Sachse Gold Medal (awarded by the Royal Geographical Society (Victorian Branch), named in honour of its president, Arthur Sachse) in 1919 for a paper delivered to the Royal Society of Victoria, dealing with the geology of the Werribee River basin.
- David Syme Research Prize in 1929 for his thesis, "Adelaide, South Australia: A Study in Human Geography"
- John Lewis Medal (awarded by the Royal Geographical Society of South Australia) in 1947 for South Australia: A Geographical Study.

A portrait of Fenner by Beulah Symes Leicester was a finalist for the 1938 Archibald Prize. A portrait by his friend Ivor Hele was held by Croydon Park College of Further Education.

== Bibliography ==
=== Books ===
Fenner was the author of six books:

- South Australia: A Geographical Study. (pub. not known). 1931.
- Bunyips and Billabongs : an Australian out of doors. Angus & Robertson, Sydney. 1933., foreword by Frederic Wood Jones
- Australites : a unique shower of glass meteorites. Royal Society of South Australia. 1934.
- An Intermediate Geography of South Australia. SA Education Department. 1944.
- Mostly Australian. Georgian House, Melbourne. 1945.

=== Other publications ===
Works published in other publications included:

==== Royal Society of Victoria ====
- Physiography of the Mansfield district, 1913–14
- Notes on the occurrence of Quartz in Basalt, 1915
- Physiography of the Glenelg River, 1918.
- Physiography of the Werribee River Area, 1918.
- The Bacchus Marsh Basin, Victoria, 1925

==== Royal Society of South Australia ====
- The craters and lakes of Mount Gambier, 1921
- Adelaide, South Australia: a study in human geography, 1927.
- A geographical enquiry into the growth, distribution and movement of population in South Australia 1836–1927, 1929.
- Major structural and physiographic features of South Australia, 1930.
- The significance of the topography of Anstey Hill, South Australia, 1939
- Australites, Part 1, Classification of the W. H. C. Shaw collection, 1934
- Australites, Part 2, Numbers, forms, distribution and origin, 1935
- Australites, Part 3, A contribution to the problem of the origin of tektites, 1938
- Australites, Part 4, The John Kennett collection, with notes on Darwin glass, bediasites, etc., 1940
- Australites, Part 5, Tektites in the South Australian Museum, with some notes on theories of origin, 1949

==== Australian and New Zealand Association for the Advancement of Science ====
- Notes on the advance of physiographical knowledge of Victoria since January 1913 (with Frederick Chapman).
- Notes on the advance of physiographical knowledge of South Australia since January 1913 (with L. K. Ward).
- The physiography of the Adelaide region, 1924.
- The natural regions of South Australia, 1930
- Report of the Research Committee on the Structural and Land Forms of Australia and New Zealand, 1935.

==== Royal Geographical Society of South Australia ====
- The growth and development of South Australia, 1934–35.
- The value of geography to the community, 1937–38
- The Kybunga daylight meteor (with G. F. Dodwell), 1942–3
- The first discoverers of South Australia; the tercentenary of Nuyts, 1925–6.
- Thebarton Cottage—the old home of Colonel William Light, 1926–7.
- Two historic gumtrees associated with the Burke and Wills expedition of 1861, 1927–8
- Colonel Light's last diary, with introductory notes by Charles Fenner, 1933–4.

==== Others ====
- Physiography of Victoria, 1923
- The structural and human geography of South Australia, 1931
- The Bacchus Marsh Basin, Victoria, 1933
- The Murray River basin, 1934
- A sketch of the geology, physiography and botanical features of the coast between Outer Harbor and Sellicks Hill (with J. B. Cleland), 1935)
- Geology and physiography of the National Parks near Adelaide, 1936
- Aboriginal records near Broken Hill (with A. B. Black) 1945
- The origin of tektites, 1933
- Australites: A unique shower of glass meteorites, 1938
- Sandtube fulgurites and their bearing on the tektite problem, 1949
- Chapter 2, Foothills, plains and streams, 1956, pp. 7–10

For 25 years he wrote a series of weekly articles on science for two Victorian newspapers, perhaps alluding to his articles as 'Tellurian' for The Australasian. It appears however, that 'Tellurian' was not one single person.

== Family ==
Fenner married teacher Emma Louise "Peggy" Hirt in Ballarat on 4 January 1911. Their five children were:

- (Charles) Lyell Fenner (17 August 1912 – 25 May 1997)
- Frank Johannes (later John) Fenner (21 December 1914 – 22 November 2010), famous biologist
- Winifred Joyce "Winn" Fenner (26 August 1916 – ) taught at Walford Anglican School for Girls. She never married.
- Lieut-Cmdr Thomas Richard "Tom" Fenner R.A.N. (18 June 1918 – 21 September 1946) married Margaret Jane Legge Suter on 10 June 1948
- William Greenock "Bill" Fenner (11 March 1922 – ) "Greenock" was named for the volcanic hill behind Charles's boyhood home. Bill was author of Quality and Productivity for the 21st Century

They had a home at 42 Alexandra Avenue, Rose Park. After Fenner's death Peggy moved to 10 Springbank Road, Panorama.
