= Australite =

Tektites found in Australia

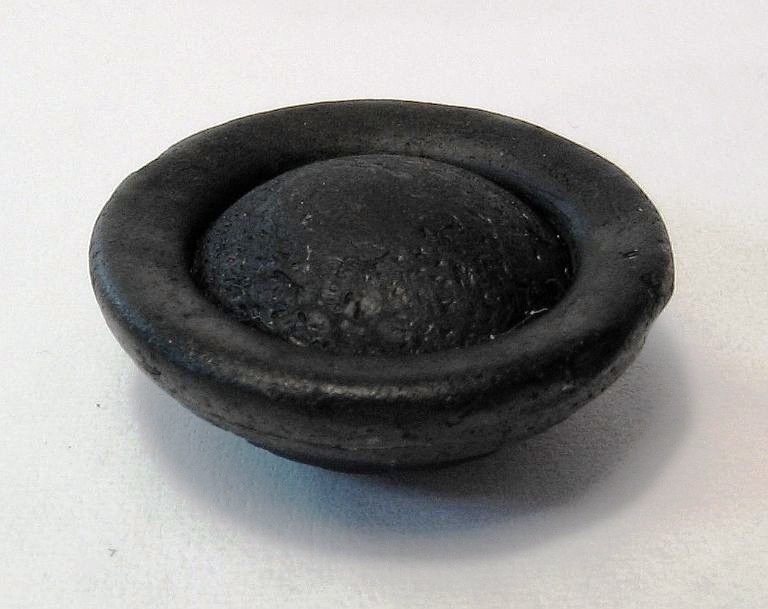
Aerodynamically shaped australite; the button shape is caused by ablation of molten glass in the atmosphere during reentry.

Australites are tektites found in Australia. They are mostly dark or black, and have shapes including discs and bowls that are not seen in other tektites.

== History ==
Indigenous Australians from the Diyari group termed australites ooga ("staring eyes"), and they were used as sacred objects or as cutting tools. Europeans found out about australites in 1857, when explorer Thomas Mitchell gave naturalist Charles Darwin a mysteriously shaped piece of natural black glass. Darwin thought that australites were of volcanic origin due to their similarity to obsidian, volcanic glass. Later, australites were called blackfellows' buttons and obsidian bombs.

One of the first scientists to seriously study australites was Charles Fenner, who saw his first australite in 1907. He believed that australites were glass meteorites.

== Origin ==
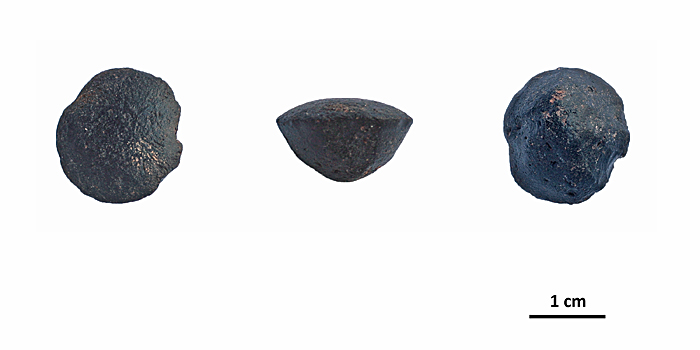
Three grams of "core-type" aerodynamically shaped Australite, looking like a miniature Apollo capsule

Early theories about the source of australites included volcanoes, the bushfires that are common in Australia, or fusion of sand by lightning (fulgurites). Some scientists believed them to be meteorites, possibly lunar meteorites ejected from the Moon in impacts (now disproved due to the different composition of lunar rocks).

Although different theories about the origin of australites are still circulating, most scientists believe that australites formed during a large asteroid or comet impact on the Earth. The impact ejected myriad small rocks right out of the atmosphere. The australites acquired their streamlined, aerodynamic forms when they re-entered the Earth's atmosphere while molten and travelling at high velocities.

Most australites are found in Southern Australia, below 25 degrees latitude. Based on similar ages and compositions, they represent the southern edge of the vast Australasian tektite strewnfield that stretches from southern China to Australia. The Australasian strewnfield has an age of 610,000 to 750,000 years and may be the result of an impact in Indochina.

== Shapes ==
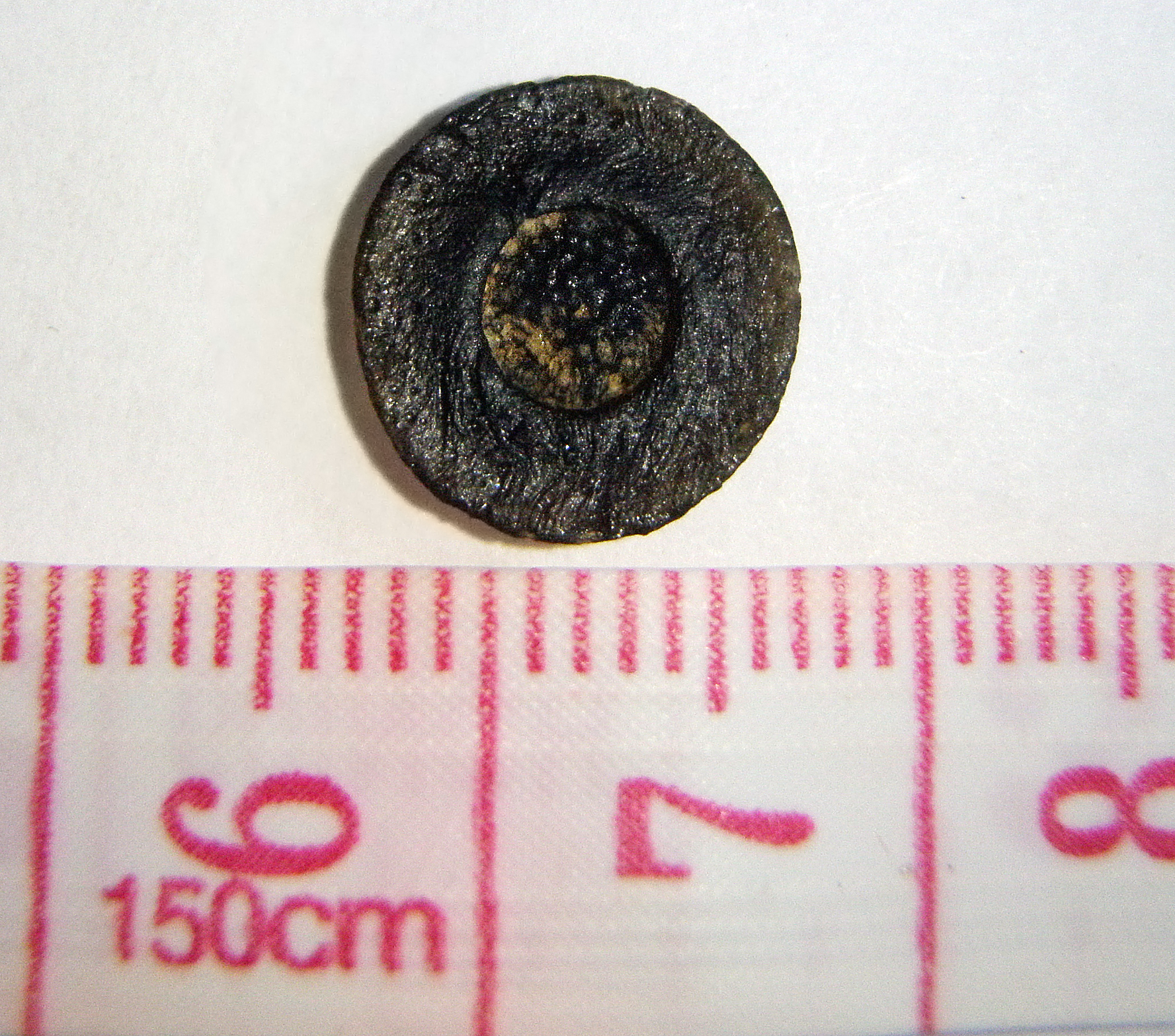
A very rare shape of australite tektite - "shallow bowl"

The primary forms of australites are sphere, oval, boat, dumbbell and teardrop. Australites are smaller than other tektites and different in shape. Their initial velocity was higher than other tektites: enough to propel them just out of the Earth's atmosphere, so they then re-entered the atmosphere and underwent a rare secondary melting.

One of the most famous australite shapes is the "flanged button". Flanged buttons are rare, but the most unusual and rarest australites are discs, bowls, plates and other small forms (mini tektites). They are very thin. George Baker called them "flying flanges", the result of distortion of "initially small primary forms by aerodynamic frictional heating". He wrote:

These are all very special forms of tektites not encountered among the other known tektite-strewn fields of the world, the rarity and unexcelled character of these well-preserved, complete to nearly complete, unique types of tektites cannot be overstressed.

Well preserved shapes are found near Port Campbell in western Victoria.

Chapman and Larson experimented on the ablation of australites. At first they seemed to prove their extraterrestrial origin, but later in repeated studies they claimed that the australites could not have come from outside the Earth-Moon system. They were able to reproduce the shapes, flanges and the peculiar network of the rings on the front face in great detail.

== See also ==
- Darwin glass
