= Tasmania (disambiguation) =

Tasmania is an island state, south of the Australian mainland.

Tasmania may also refer to:

== Places ==
- Colony of Tasmania, a British colony on the island of Tasmania from 1856 until it became an Australian state in 1901
- Tasmania Islands, an uninhabited group of islands in Canada

== Vessels ==
- HMAS Tasmania, a destroyer that served with the Royal Australian Navy from 1918 until 1928
- MV Tasmania, a former escort carrier used as a ferry between France and Australia from 1958 until 1961
- Tasmania, a maxi yacht that won the Sydney to Hobart Yacht Race in 1994

== Sport ==
- Tasmania Devils (NAB League), an Australian rules football team in the NAB League Boys and NAB League Girls competitions
- Tasmania Devils Football Club (VFL), an Australian Rules Football team in the Victorian Football League
- Tasmanian Roar, the women's representative cricket team for the state of Tasmania
- Tasmanian Tigers, the cricket team that represents the Australian state of Tasmania
- Tasmania United, a proposed Hyundai A-League side
- SC Tasmania 1900 Berlin, a former German association football club

== Other ==
- Tasmania (album), a 2019 album by Australian psychedelic band Pond
- Tasmania (wine)
- 45569 Tasmania, a British LMS Jubilee Class locomotive
- Relational Model/Tasmania, a version of relational modeling published by E.F. Codd in 1979

== See also ==
- Tasman (disambiguation)
- Tasmanian devil
- Taz-Mania
