= Australasian strewnfield =

Strewnfield containing most of Australasia

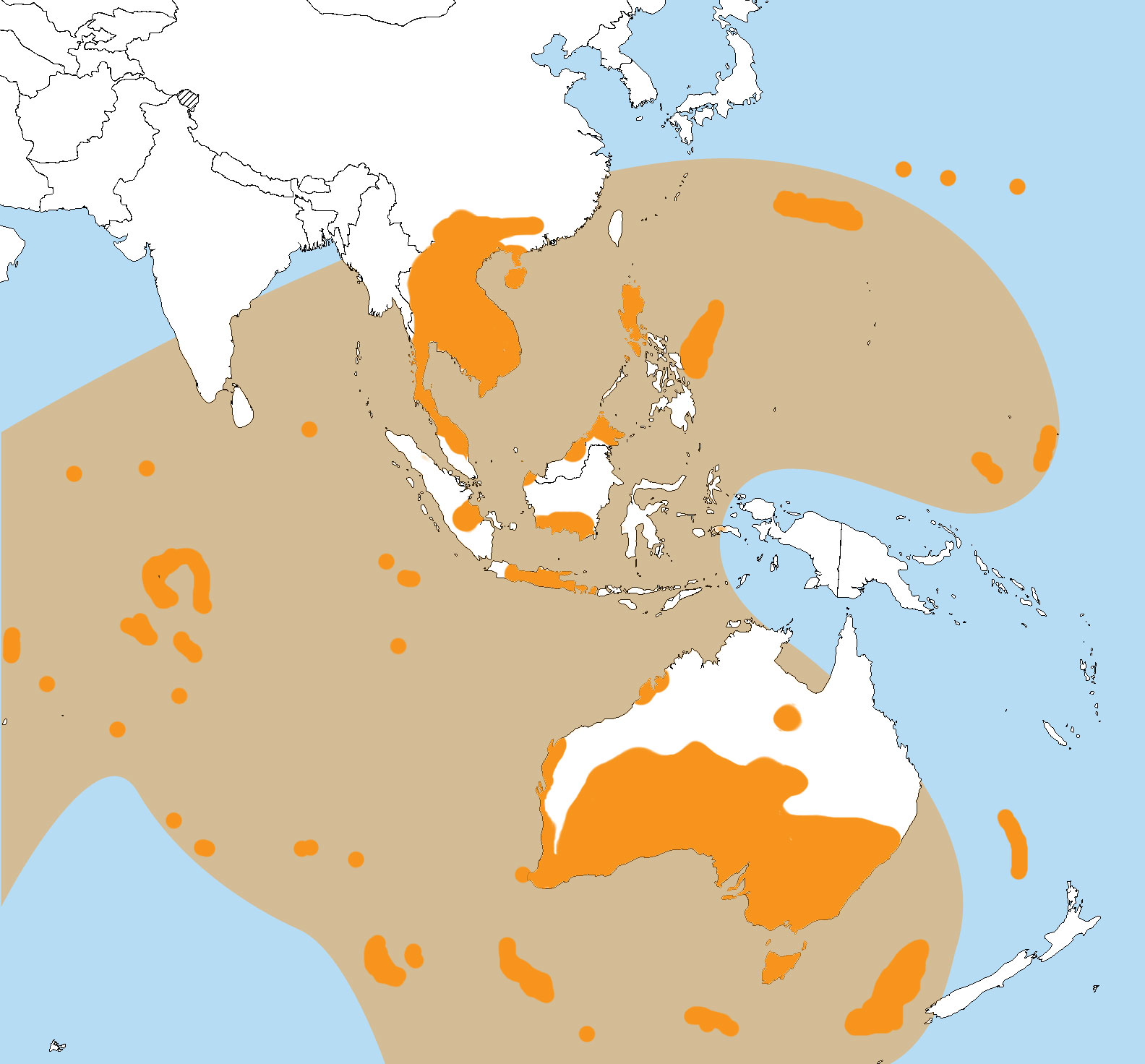
Australasian strewnfield. Shaded areas represent tektite finds.

The Australasian strewnfield is the youngest and largest of the tektite strewnfields, with recent estimates suggesting it might cover 10%–30% of the Earth's surface. Research indicates that the impact forming the tektites occurred around 788,000 years ago, most likely in Southeast Asia. The location of the crater is unknown and has been the subject of multiple competing hypotheses.

== Introduction ==
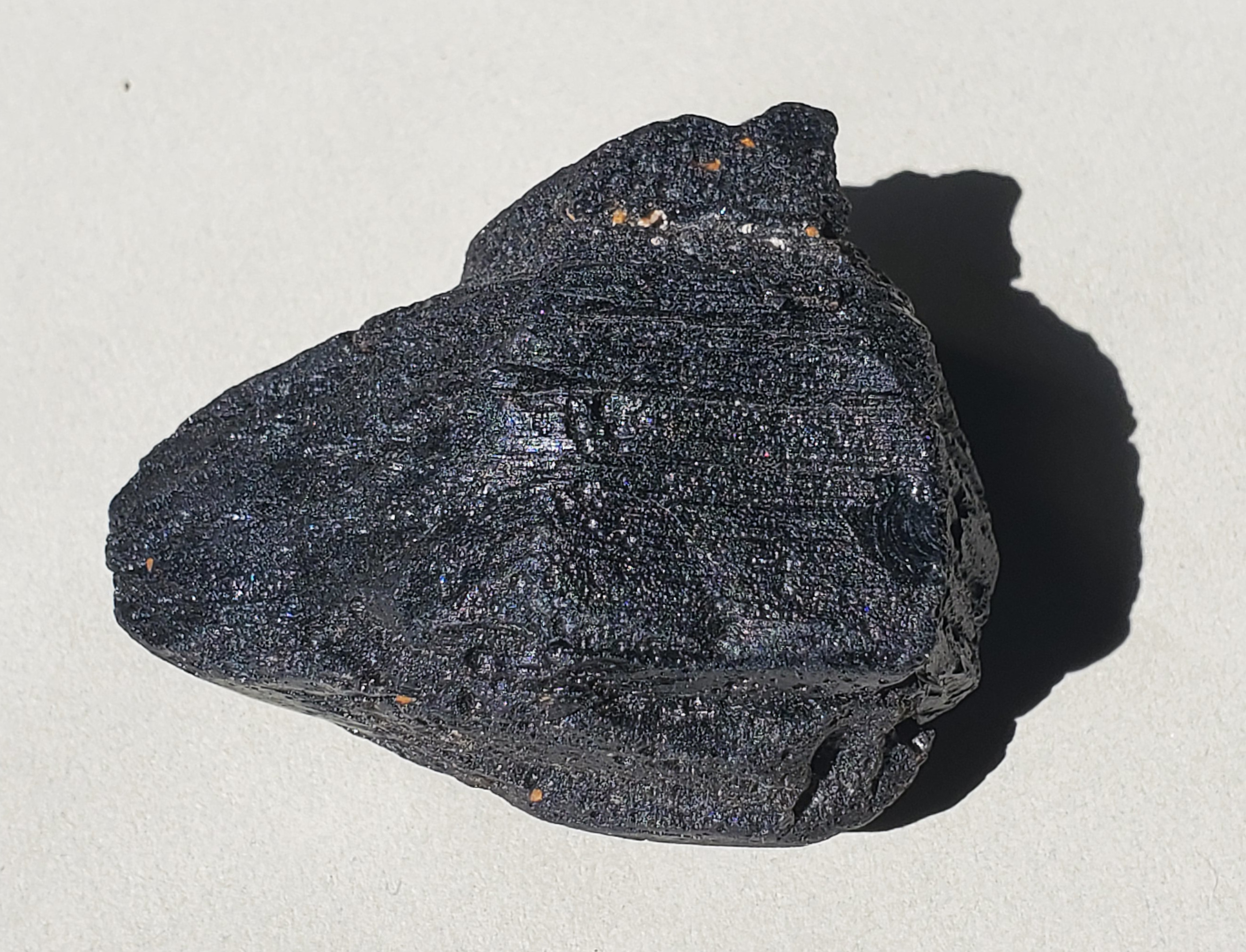
Muong Nong type indochinite from the Ubon Ratchathani province of Thailand

The c. 788,000-year-old strewnfield includes most of Southeast Asia (Thailand, Laos, Vietnam, Cambodia, and Southern China). The material from the impact stretches east across the ocean to include the Philippines, Indonesia, and Malaysia. It also reaches far west out into the Indian Ocean, and south to Australia, including Tasmania. Since the 1960s, it has been accepted that the strewnfield included Hainan in southern China to Australia or about 10% of the Earth's surface. This was later extended by finds in Africa and Tasmania to 20%. Additional finds in northern Tibet, Guangxi and Antarctica increased the strewnfield to about 30% of the Earth's surface, or almost 150,000,000 km^{2} (58,000,000 sq mi), or about the size of the entire world's landmass.

== Source crater ==
The current consensus is that the source impact crater for the Australasian strewnfield lies somewhere in Southeast Asia. It is argued that due to the enormous size of the Australasian strewnfield, the source impact crater must be significantly larger in size than the source impact craters of the other known strewnfields. Many locations have been proposed. Schmidt and Wasson (1993) suggested there could be a 14–17-kilometre-diameter (8.7–10.6 mi) source crater beneath the Mekong Valley, Hartung and Koeberl (1994) proposed the elongated 35-by-100-kilometre (22 by 62 mi) Tonlé Sap lake in Cambodia, Glass (1994) estimated the source crater to be between 32–114 km (20–71 mi) in diameter and located in Cambodia, and Schnetzler (1996) suggested a 35–40 km structure in southern Laos. Later, Glass (1999) also considered southern Laos or an adjacent area as a possible source. In 1991, Wasson et al. studied layered tektites in central Thailand and explained the lack of a large recognizable source crater by occurrence of small, diffuse, multiple-impact event spread out over the region. This explanation raises some problems, in particular the strewnfield's tektites having a different chemical composition than Cambodian sandstone from the time of impact. Lee and Wei (2000) concluded that the source of the Australasian strewnfield is a large impact crater in Indochina and estimated it to be 90–116 km (56–72 mi) in diameter. Other proposed locations are between southern Laos and Hainan by Ma et al. (2001) and possibly within the Gulf of Tonkin as argued by Whymark. More recently in 2020 and again in 2023 Sieh et al. proposed on the basis of various lines of evidence that the crater lies buried beneath the Bolaven volcanic field in southern Laos, and was around 15 kilometres (9.3 mi) in diameter. Another 2023 study alternatively suggested that the crater was buried under sand dunes in the Badain Jaran Desert in northwest China.

The lack of a recognizable source crater in Southeast Asia has also been explained by proposing it being located outside of Southeast Asia. Some of these proposed locations for the source of the Australasian strewnfield lying outside of Southeast Asia include the Wilkes Land crater in Antarctica, the Zhamanshin crater in Kazakhstan, and the Elgygytgyn crater in Siberia.

== Brunhes–Matuyama reversal ==
It has been proposed that the impact may have triggered the Brunhes–Matuyama reversal of 781,000 years ago. This proposal was based on the apparent contemporaneous timing of the Brunhes–Matuyama reversal and occurrence of Australasian tektites in cores of pelagic deep sediments and apparent association of tektites of two other strewn fields, including the Ivory Coast strewn field, in deep sea cores with other magnetic reversals. In 1985, Muller and others proposed a geophysical model that explained the magnetic reversals as the result of a decrease in geomagnetic field intensity associated with a minor glaciation that was caused by and followed the impact event. In the early 1990s, Schneider and others conducted a detailed isotopic, geophysical and paleontological analysis of deep sea cores and concluded that the Australasian impact event preceded the Brunhes-Matuyama reversal of magnetic field by about 12,000 years; that the field intensity was increasing near the time of impact; and increased for 4,000 years afterward. They also found a lack of any indication of discernible climate cooling (minor glaciation) following the impact as predicted by Muller and others in their 1985 model. They also found that during the critical interval after the impact, deglaciation, in fact, occurred. Based upon these findings, they did not support the proposition that the Australasian impact event and Brunhes-Matuyama reversal were associated with each other. A similar study of the association between Ivory Coast strewn field and the onset of the Jaramillo normal polarity subchron found them also not to be contempraneous as previously inferred. They were separated in time by 30,000 years.

== Homo erectus ==
Guangxi in southern China

Archeological artifacts found with these tektites in Baise, Guangxi in southern China indicate that a Homo erectus population was living in the area during and after the impact. Stone tools have been found within the debris field along with a charcoal layer likely caused by fires from the impact. It has been suggested that the subsequent local deforestation after the fires allowed this population easier access to stones useful for tool-making.

== See also ==
- Australite
- Glossary of meteoritics
- List of possible impact structures on Earth
