= Zhamanshin crater =

Meteorite impact crater in Kazakhstan

Zhamanshin Crater
- Jaman şıñ
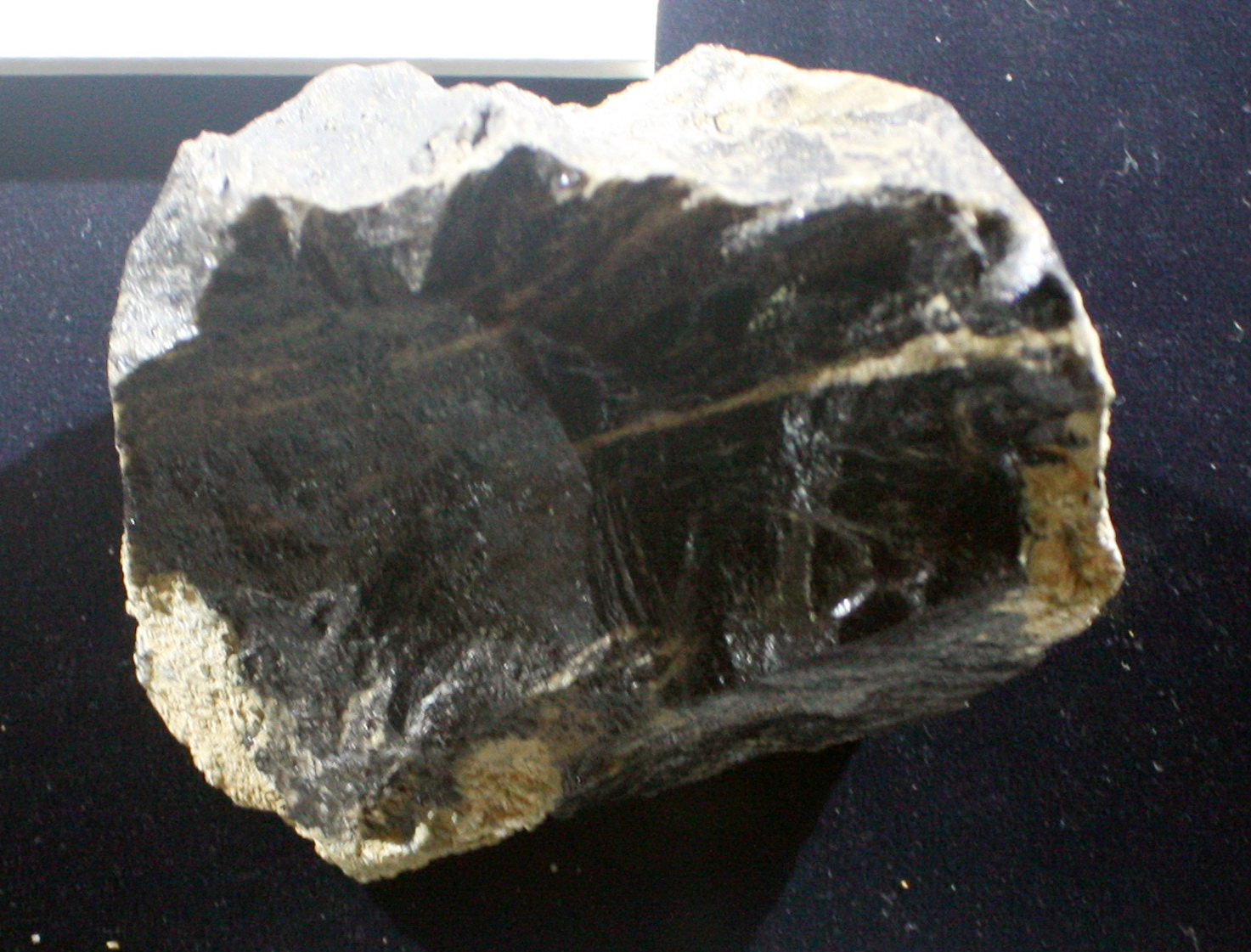
- Impact glass from the Zhamanshin impact site

- Location within Kazakhstan
- Location: Aktobe Region, Kazakhstan; 48°24′N 60°58′E

Impact crater structure
- Confidence: Not confieremed
- Diameter: 14 km (8.7 mi)
- Age: 900,000 ± 100,000 years Mid Pleistocene
- Exposed: Yes
- Drilled: no
- Bolide type: Chondrite

Zhamanshin (Kazakh: Жаман шың, romanized: Jaman shun) is a meteorite crater in Kazakhstan. It is 14 kilometres (8.7 mi) in diameter and the age is estimated to be 900,000 ± 100,000 years (Pleistocene). The crater is exposed at the surface.

== Description ==
It is believed that the Zhamanshin crater is the site of the most recent meteorite impact event of the magnitude that could have produced a disruption comparable to that of a nuclear winter, but it was not sufficiently large enough to have caused a mass extinction.

Preliminary papers in the late 1970s suggested either Elgygytgyn, or Zhamanshin, as the source of the Australasian strewnfield.
