= Indochinite =

Debris ejected during meteorite impacts

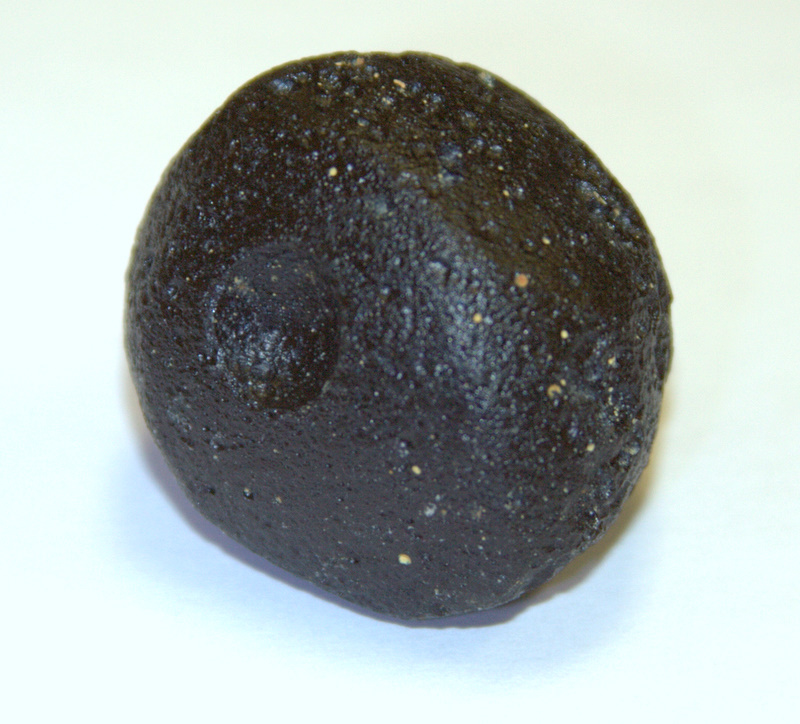

An Indochinite is a type of tektite. Tektites were ejected into the Earth's upper atmosphere by a meteorite impact and subsequently cooled to form the distinctive glass-like structure. Indochinites are distinctly dark black in contrast to the green of European moldavite tektites. It is estimated that these bodies of solidified magma are 700,000 years old. Indochinite tektites, as the name suggests, are found in the Indochinese peninsula, from Australia and the Pacific islands of Micronesia in the east and south, to China and Indonesia in the north and west. The largest indochinite is a Muong-Nong type tektite (which are layered tektites), which had a mass of 29.0 kg.

== See also ==
- Australasian strewnfield
