= Tasmanite (mineral) =

Fossilised organic resin from Tasmania

General
- Category: Fossil resins
- Formula: C_{40}H_{124}O_{2}S

Identification
- Color: reddish brown to brown
- Crystal habit: narrow scaly lenses, difficult to separate from the main rock
- Cleavage: absent
- Fracture: conchoidal, viscous
- Tenacity: viscous, soft mineral
- Mohs scale hardness: ~ 2
- Luster: waxy, greasy
- Streak: white
- Diaphaneity: translucent
- Density: ~ 1,8

Tasmanite, or Tasmanian amber (in the original sense of the word: “discovered in Tasmania”) — a rare regional mineraloid, a brownish-reddish fossilized organic resin from the island of Tasmania, formed in some deposits of the parent rock (tasmanite shale) and known by the same name: tasmanite.

Found in bituminized shales on the banks of the Mersey River (northern Tasmania), this mineral was examined and described in 1865 by Professor A. J. Church. Meanwhile, translucent tasmanite is not formed everywhere where there are deposits of the sedimentary rock of the same name, but only in some layers.

Over the next century and a half, almost no new evidence appeared about Tasmanian amber.

== Origin and genesis ==
The parent rock, also called Tasmanite, is itself a special type of sedimentary rock of organic origin, common not only in Tasmania or Australia, but also throughout the globe. Tasmanite as a rock is a typical oil shale, liptobiolite-sapropelite with a very high carbon content, formed from Late Permian and Carboniferous deposits of unicellular algae. In appearance, Tasmanite is a fossilized amorphous mass containing large quantities of remains of spores (cysts) and pollen. In its pure form, tasmanite consists almost entirely of flattened and compressed microspore shells. The initial forming substance is necroma of brackish-water seaweeds from the genus Tasmanites (Latin: Tasmanites; Newton, 1875). The color of the differences is always dark, mixed, the tonality varies depending on the location in the range from gray-brown to black; Due to the high spore content, most samples appear to be covered in yellow pollen. The same picture is visible on the tasmanite fracture.

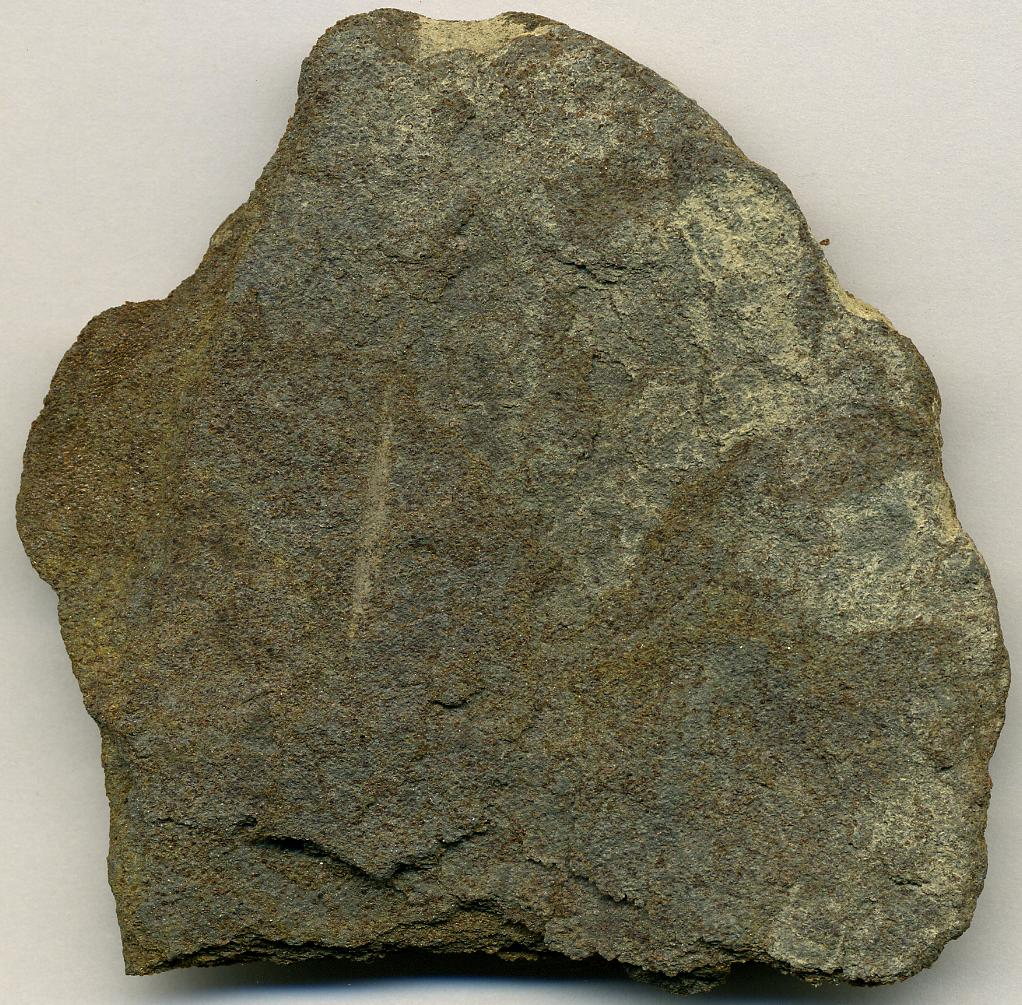
Mother rock sample

Tasmanite is distinguished by a very high homogeneity of composition; it consists almost exclusively of organic matter, compressed shells of microspores of algae from the genus Tasmanites and, thus, can be classified as a standard liptobiolite. The carbon content in pure samples fluctuates around 81% with a small error. After burning Tasmanite, a small amount of white ash remains, retaining the shape of the original sample. Tasmanites throughout the world are among the richest oil source rocks; the conversion factor of organic matter into oil is about 78%.

Tasmanite rarely forms independent accumulations; for the most part it accompanies deposits of various coals of autochthonous origin, that is, coals that occur at the site of deposition of organic matter that gave them their origin. The thickness of Tasmanite layers, as a rule, does not exceed 1.5 meters, moreover, they are not continuous, but separated by a layer of sedimentary clay. In one of these layers in the vicinity of the Mersey River, Professor A. J. Church discovered in 1864 translucent mineral formations, their appearance reminiscent of dark reddish-brown amber.

The discovered layer of Tasmanite shale, according to the researcher, was significantly different from other deposits that he had to examine. Fossil resin of a brownish-reddish color and gelified appearance was contained here not just in the form of inclusions, but in very large quantities, literally penetrating the entire layer, which was especially noticeable in the section.

Translucent reddish-brown or brown varieties grown into the Tasmanite shale ultimately accounted for up to 40% of the main rock and had the appearance of narrow scaly lenses, difficult to separate from the main rock. It is also known that this deposit itself had a small size and was located near the floodplain of the River Mersey. Professor Church did not indicate a more precise location.

== Properties and composition ==
The organic mineraloid, described under the name Tasmanite, was translucent even when not polished, standing out sharply against the background of the main rock. It had a reddish-brown or reddish-brown color and a waxy sheen. The hardness on the Mohs scale was approximately 2, and the density was significantly higher than that of amber, hovering around 1.8. The fracture of the mineral was conchoidal. Birefringence, dispersion and distinct pleochroism were absent.

Professor A. J. Church also investigated the chemical composition, within the limits of his capabilities. As it turned out, according to the results of the research, when heated, the mineral easily melted, emitting a strong odor, probably oil-like. Tasmanite also dissolved slowly in hydrochloric acid, ethyl alcohol and turpentine. According to analyzes of several samples, the mineral contained 79.34% carbon, 10.41% hydrogen, 4.93% oxygen and 5.32% sulfur — as you can see, the given figures add up to 100%. From here the approximate formula of tasmanite was derived: C_{40}H_{124}O_{2}S. In addition to the high content of sulfur (organic sulfides), attention is drawn to the relatively high specific gravity of this substance.

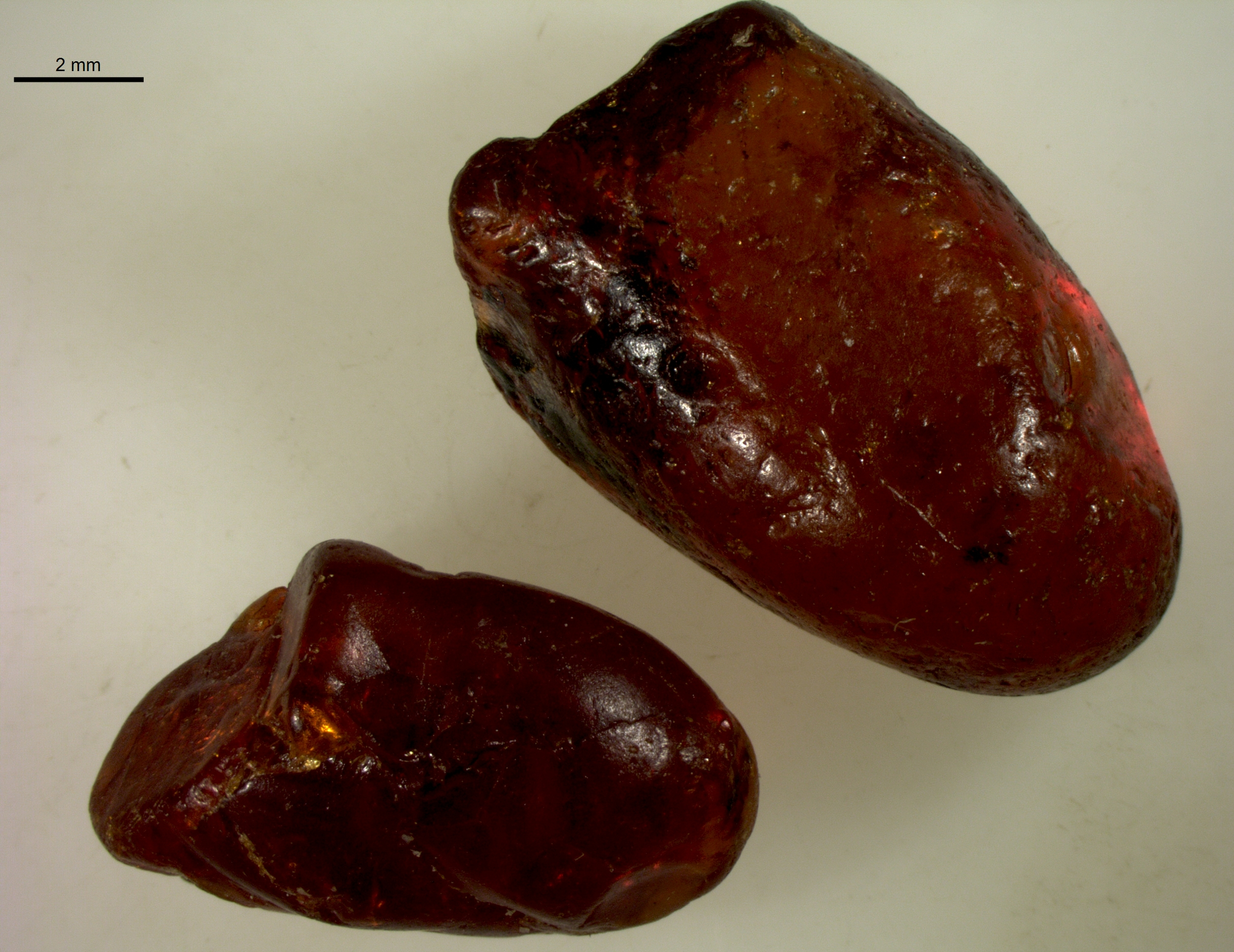
Sakhalin resinite («amber»), similar to tasmanite

Probably, the inclusions of resinous translucent tasmanite in the bulk of the Tasmanite schist were not necessarily associated with the presence of any other resin-containing plant remains, except for the rock-forming algae of the genus Tasmanites. Most likely, the effect of compaction and clarification of the mineral had a connection with deeper metamorphism of the rock in this particular place. As the German petrographer M. Teichmüller noted in a comparative study at the end of the 1960s, the appearance of a reddish tint for liptobiolites formed by this alga is characteristic of the fatty carbon stage. Microscopic studies of thin sections of two Tasmanites from different deposits showed that Alaskan Tasmanites, which have a reddish sheen, are metamorphosed to a much greater extent than Australian ones, which have a golden-yellow color of weakly "carbonized" liptobiolite.

Taking into account all known data, it would be most accurate to define “Tasmanian amber” as a compacted and partially purified infiltrate formed as a result of the metamorphism of the Late Carboniferous shale of the same name.

There is also no doubt that the external similarity is not accidental: amber and tasmanite belong to the same group of liptobilites – fossil coals enriched with the most decomposition-resistant components of plant matter: waxes, fossil resins, and other similar natural compounds. In addition to amber and tasmanite, representatives of this group of caustobiolites are, for example, the organic mineral fichtelite.

In the old mineralogical literature, a large number of specific names were proposed for resins of various origins <... for example>, tasmanite is the name given to the compacted Late Carboniferous infiltrates of Tasmania...

— Vladimir Zherikhin, "Introduction to paleoentomology", 2008

On the other hand, the trivial name "Tasmanian amber" found in the literature should not be perceived as anything other than a mineralogical metaphor that simplifies the outside perception of a little-known object. Fossil resins in general are often called amber, since this mineraloid is undoubtedly the most popular and well known among other stones of organic origin. Fossil resins other than true amber are sometimes also classified as retinites or resinites, but these terms are not clearly defined. It is obvious that tasmanite can appear as a special regional liptobiolite among the specific names of natural resins of various origins adopted in the old mineralogical literature. These undoubtedly include simetite (Sicilian amber), romanite (Romanian amber), chemavinite and cedarite (Canadian chalk resins) and many others that have the status of local "amber".

== See also ==
- Tasmanite
- Cannel coal
- Kerosene shale
- Amber
- Copal
- List of types of amber
- Petrified wood
