= Tektite =

Gravel-sized glass beads formed from meteorite impacts

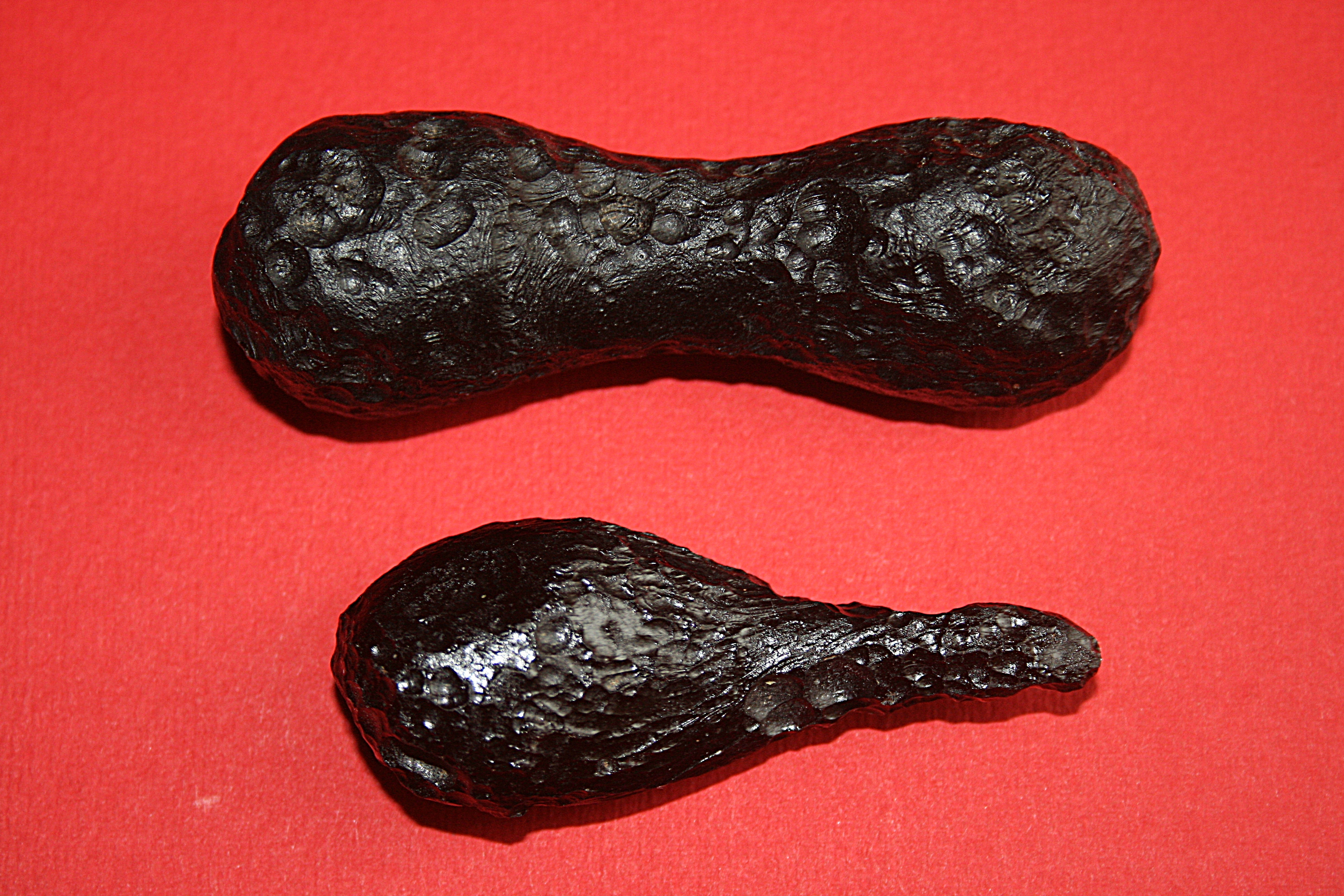
Two splash-form tektites, molten terrestrial ejecta from a meteorite impact

Tektites (from Ancient Greek τηκτός (tēktós) 'molten') are gravel-sized bodies composed of black, green, brown or grey natural glass formed from terrestrial debris ejected during meteorite impacts. The term was coined by Austrian geologist Franz Eduard Suess. They generally range in size from millimetres to centimetres. Millimetre-scale tektites are known as microtektites.

Tektites are characterized by:

1. a fairly homogeneous composition
2. an extremely low content of water and other volatiles
3. an abundance of lechatelierite
4. a general lack of microscopic crystals known as microlites
5. no chemical relationship to the local bedrock or local sediments
6. distribution within geographically extensive strewn fields

== Characteristics ==
Although tektites are superficially similar to some terrestrial volcanic glasses (obsidians), they have unusual distinctive physical characteristics that distinguish them from such glasses:

- they are completely glassy and lack any microlites or phenocrysts, unlike terrestrial volcanic glasses.
- although high in silica (>65 wt%), the bulk chemical and isotopic composition of tektites is closer to those of shales and similar sedimentary rocks and quite different from the bulk chemical and isotopic composition of terrestrial volcanic glasses.
- they contain virtually no water (<0.02 wt%), unlike terrestrial volcanic glasses.
- the flow-banding often contains particles and bands of lechatelierite, which are not found in terrestrial volcanic glasses.
- a few tektites contain partly melted inclusions of shocked and unshocked mineral grains, i.e. quartz, apatite, and zircon, as well as coesite.

The difference in water content can be used to distinguish tektites from terrestrial volcanic glasses. When heated to their melting point, terrestrial volcanic glasses turn into a foamy glass because of their content of water and other volatiles. Unlike terrestrial volcanic glass, a tektite produces only a few bubbles at most when heated to its melting point, because of its much lower water and other volatiles content.

== Classification ==
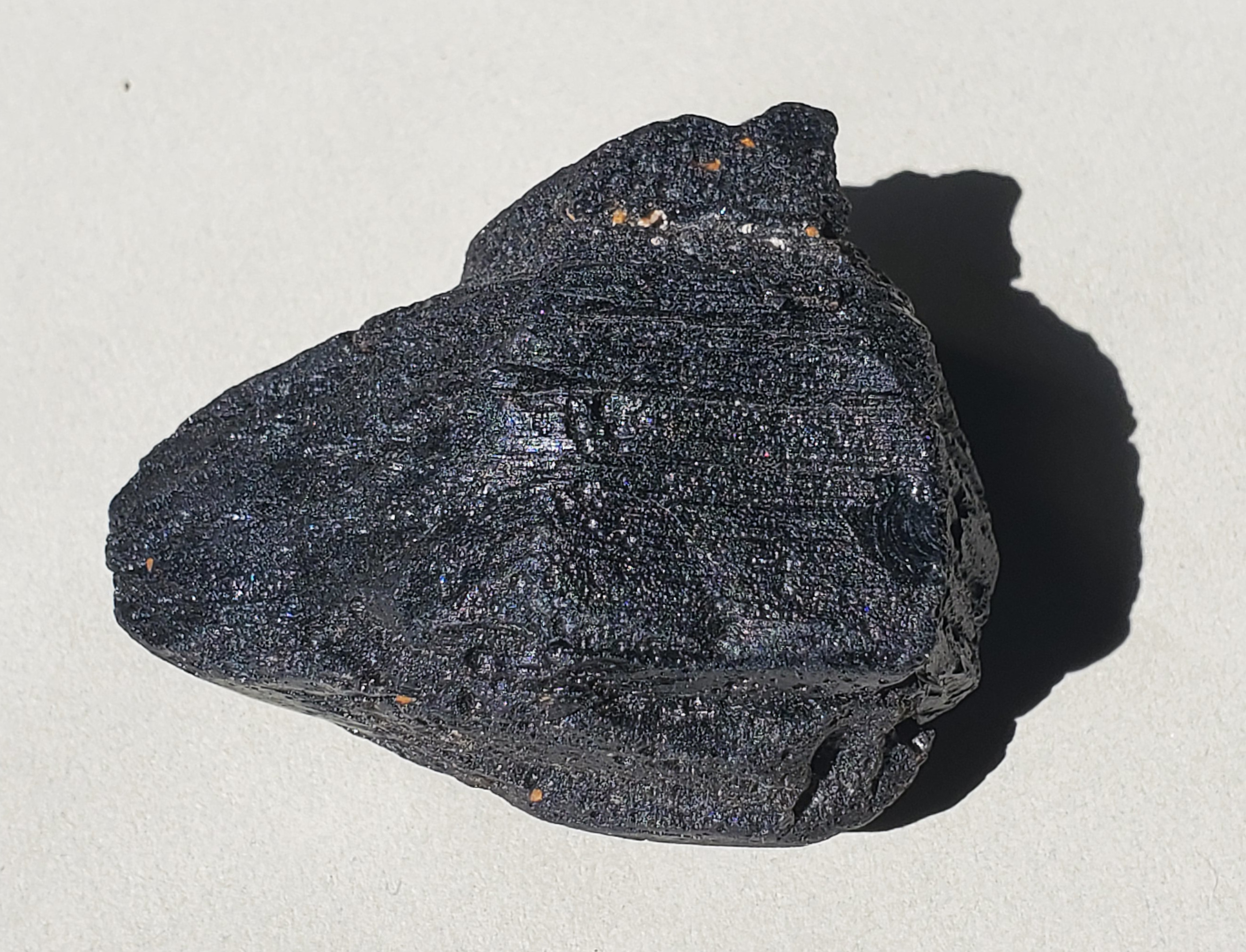
Muong Nong Indochinite with layered structure and inclusions.

On the basis of morphology and physical characteristics, tektites have traditionally been divided into four groups: (1) splash-form (normal) tektites, (2) aerodynamically-shaped tektites, and (3) Muong Nong (layered) tektites., and (4) microtektites.

Splash-form and aerodynamically-shaped tektites are differentiated on the basis of their appearance and some of their physical characteristics. Splash-form tektites are centimeter-sized tektites that are shaped like spheres, ellipsoids, teardrops, dumbbells, and other forms characteristic of isolated molten bodies. They are regarded as having formed from the solidification of rotating liquids, and not atmospheric ablation. Aerodynamically-shaped tektites, which are mainly part of the Australasian strewnfield, are splash-form tektites (buttons) which display a secondary ring or flange. The secondary ring or flange is argued as having been produced during the high-speed re-entry and ablation of a solidified splash-form tektite into the atmosphere.

Muong Nong tektites are typically larger, greater than 10 cm in size and 24 kg in weight, irregular, and layered tektites. They have a chunky, blocky appearance, exhibit a layered structure with abundant vesicles, and contain mineral inclusions, such as zircon, baddeleyite, chromite, rutile, corundum, cristobalite, and coesite. Microtektites are less than 1 mm in size. They exhibit a variety of shapes ranging from spherical to dumbbell, disc, oval, and teardrop. Their colors range from colorless and transparent to yellowish and pale brown. They frequently contain bubbles and lechatelierite inclusions. Microtektites are typically found in deep-sea sediments that are of the same ages as those of the four known strewn fields. Microtektites of the Australasian strewnfield have also been found on land within Chinese loess deposits and in sediment-filled joints and decimeter-sized weathering pits developed within glacially-eroded granite outcrops of the Victoria Land Transantarctic Mountains, Antarctica.

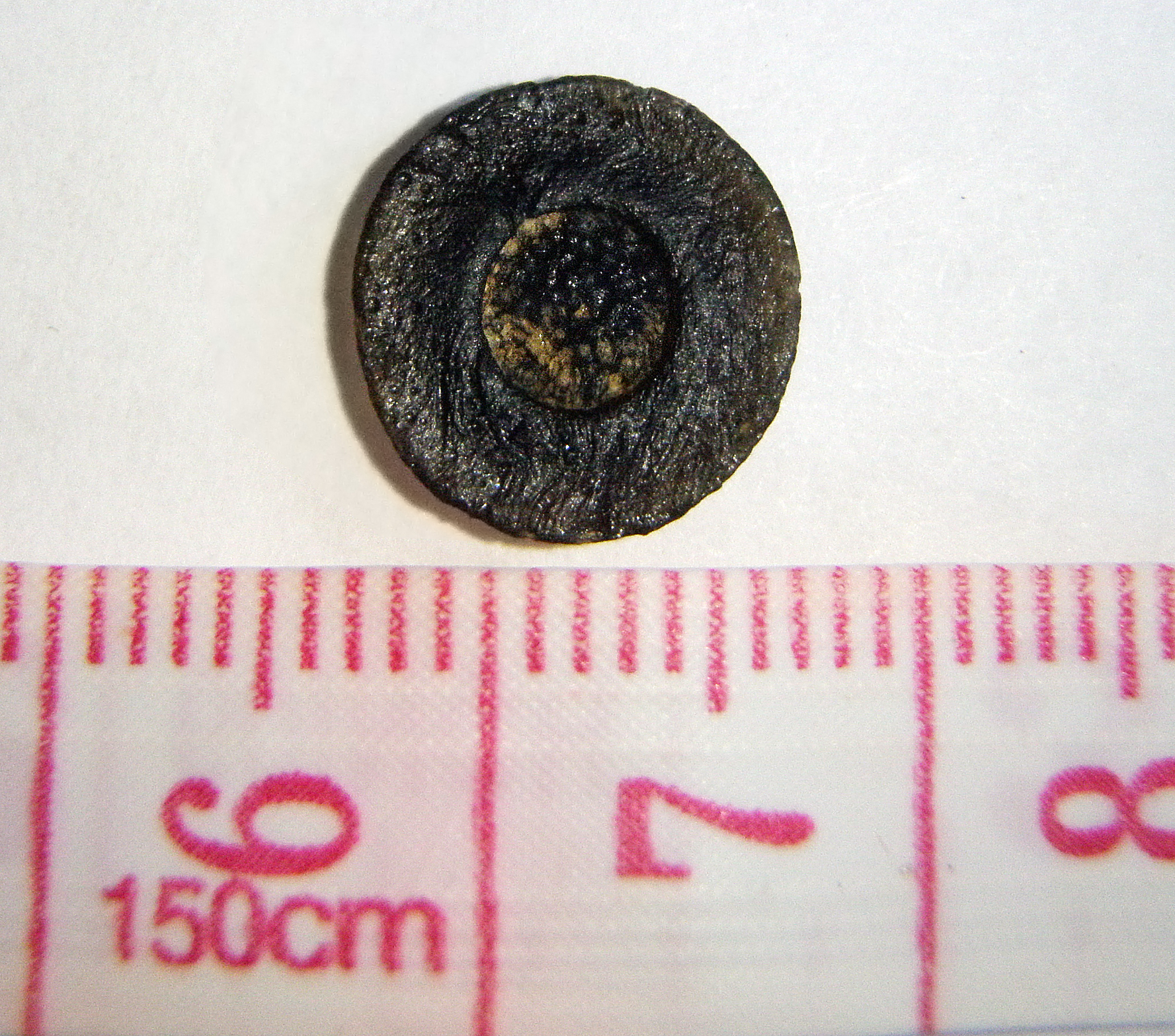
A very rare aerodynamically shaped Australite – Shallow Bowl

== Occurrence ==
Most tektites have been found within four geographically extensive strewn fields: the Australasian, Central European, Ivory Coast, and North American. As summarized by Koeberl, the tektites within each strewn field are related to each other with respect to the criteria of petrological, physical, and chemical properties, as well as their age. In addition, three of the four strewn fields have been clearly linked with impact craters using those same criteria. Recognized types of tektites, grouped according to their known strewn fields, their associated craters, and ages are:

- Australasian strewnfield Approximate age: 0.77–0.78 million years), no confirmed crater:
  - Australites (Australia, dark, mostly black);
  - Indochinites (South East Asia, dark, mostly black);
  - Philippinites (Philippines, black).
- Central European strewnfield (Nördlinger Ries impact crater (24 km), Germany, age: 15 million years):
  - Moldavites (Czech Republic, green).
- Ivory Coast strewnfield (Lake Bosumtwi impact crater (10 km), Ghana, age: 1 million years):
  - Ivorites (Ivory Coast, black).
- North American tektite strewn field (Chesapeake Bay impact crater (40 km), United States – age: 34 million years):
  - Bediasites (Texas – black to dark brown, some with metallic finish);
  - Georgiaites (Georgia – green).

Comparing the number of known impact craters versus the number of known strewn fields, Natalia Artemieva considers essential factors such as the crater must exceed a certain diameter to produce distal ejecta and that the event must be relatively recent. Limiting to diameters 10 km or more and younger than 50 Ma, the study yielded a list of 13 candidate craters, of which the youngest eight are given below.

Name	Location	Age (million years)	Diameter (km)	Strewn field
?	Indochina?	0.788 ± .0028	32–114?	Australasian strewn field
Zhamanshin	Kazakhstan	0.9 ± 0.1	14	?
Bosumtwi	Ghana	1.07	10	Ivory Coast strewn field
Elgygytgyn	Russia, Siberia	3.5 ± 0.5	18	?
Karakul	Tajikistan	<5	52	?
Karla	Russia	5 ± 1	10	?
Ries	Germany	15.1 ± 0.1	24	Central European strewn field
Chesapeake Bay	US	35.5 ± 0.3	40	North American strewn field
Popigai	Russia, Siberia	35.7 ± 0.2	100	?

Preliminary papers in the late 1970s suggest either Zhamanshin or Elgygytgyn as the source of the Australasian strewnfield. Povenmire and others have proposed the existence of an additional tektite strewn field, the Central American strewn field. Evidence for this reported tektite strewn field consists of tektites recovered from western Belize in the area of the villages of Bullet Tree Falls, Santa Familia, and Billy White. This area lies about 55 km east-southeast of Tikal, where 13 tektites, two of which were dated as being 820,000 years old, of unknown origin were found. A limited amount of evidence is interpreted as indicating that the proposed Central American strewn field likely covers Belize, Honduras, Guatemala, Nicaragua, and possibly parts of southern Mexico. The hypothesized Pantasma Impact Crater in northern Nicaragua might be the source of these tektites.

== Age ==
The ages of tektites from the four strewn fields have been determined using radiometric dating methods. The age of moldavites, a type of tektite found in the Czech Republic, was determined to be 14 million years, which agrees well with the age determined for the Nördlinger Ries crater (a few hundred kilometers away in Germany) by radiometric dating of Suevite (an impact breccia found at the crater). Similar agreements exist between tektites from the North American strewn field and the Chesapeake Bay impact crater and between tektites from the Ivory Coast strewn field and the Lake Bosumtwi Crater. Ages of tektites have usually been determined by either the K-Ar method, fission track dating, the Ar-Ar technique, or combination of these techniques. Tektites in geological and archaeological deposits have been used as age markers of stratified deposits, but this practice is controversial.

== Origins ==
=== Terrestrial source theory ===
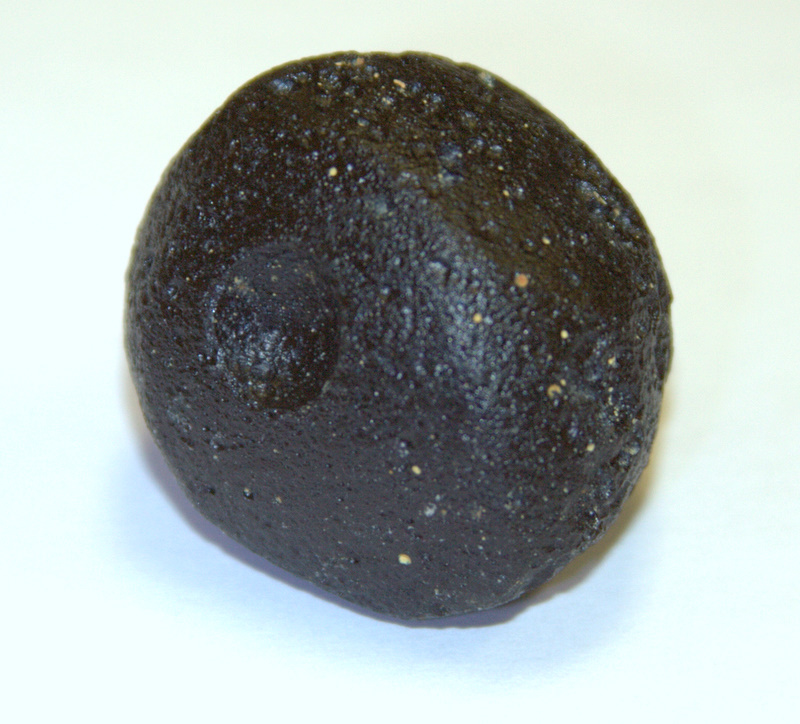
A simple, spherical splash-form Indochinite tektite

The overwhelming consensus of Earth and planetary scientists is that tektites consist of terrestrial debris that was ejected during the formation of an impact crater. During the extreme conditions created by a hypervelocity meteorite impact, near-surface terrestrial sediments and rocks were either melted, vaporized, or some combination of these, and ejected from an impact crater. After ejection from the impact crater, the material formed millimeter- to centimeter-sized bodies of molten material, which as they re-entered the atmosphere, rapidly cooled to form tektites that fell to Earth to create a layer of distal ejecta hundreds or thousands of kilometers away from the impact site.

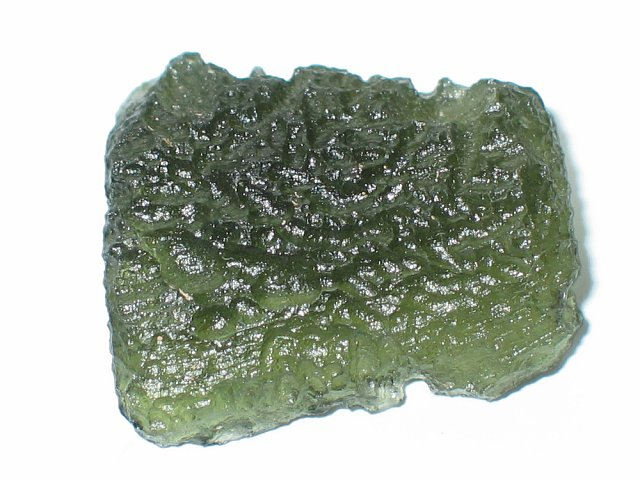
A moldavite tektite

The terrestrial source for tektites is supported by well-documented evidence. The chemical and isotopic composition of tektites indicates that they are derived from the melting of silica-rich crustal and sedimentary rocks, which are not found on the Moon. In addition, some tektites contain relict mineral inclusions (quartz, zircon, rutile, chromite, and monazite) that are characteristic of terrestrial sediments and crustal and sedimentary source rocks. Also, three of the four tektite strewnfields have been linked by their age and chemical and isotopic composition to known impact craters. Geochemical studies of tektites from the Australasian strewnfield conclude that these tektites consist of melted Jurassic sediments, or sedimentary rocks that were weathered and deposited about 167 Mya. Their geochemistry suggests that the source of Australasian tektites is a single sedimentary formation with a narrow range of stratigraphic ages close to 170 Mya, more or less. This effectively refutes multiple impact hypotheses.

Although the formation and widespread distribution of tektites is widely accepted to require the intense (superheated) melting of near-surface sediments and rocks at the impact site and the following high-velocity ejection of this material from the impact crater, the exact processes involved remain poorly understood. One possible mechanism for the formation of tektites is by the jetting of highly shocked and superheated melt during the initial contact/compression stage of impact crater formation. Alternatively, various mechanisms involving the dispersal of shock-melted material by an expanding vapor plume, which is created by a hypervelocity impact, have been used to explain the formation of tektites. Any mechanism by which tektites are created must explain chemical data that suggest that parent material from which tektites were created came from near-surface rocks and sediments at an impact site. In addition, the scarcity of known strewn fields relative to the number of identified impact craters indicate that very special and rarely met circumstances are required for tektites to be created by a meteorite impact.

=== Nonterrestrial source theories ===
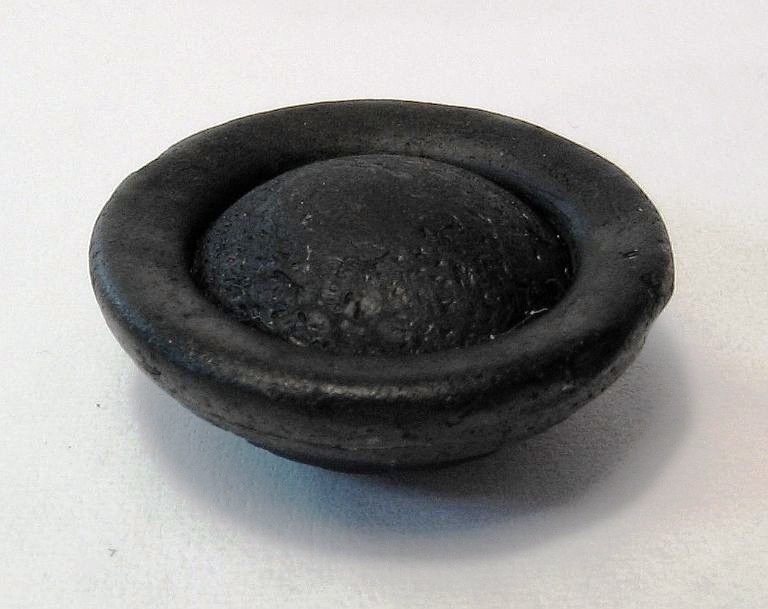
Aerodynamically shaped australite, its button shape caused by ablation of molten glass in the atmosphere

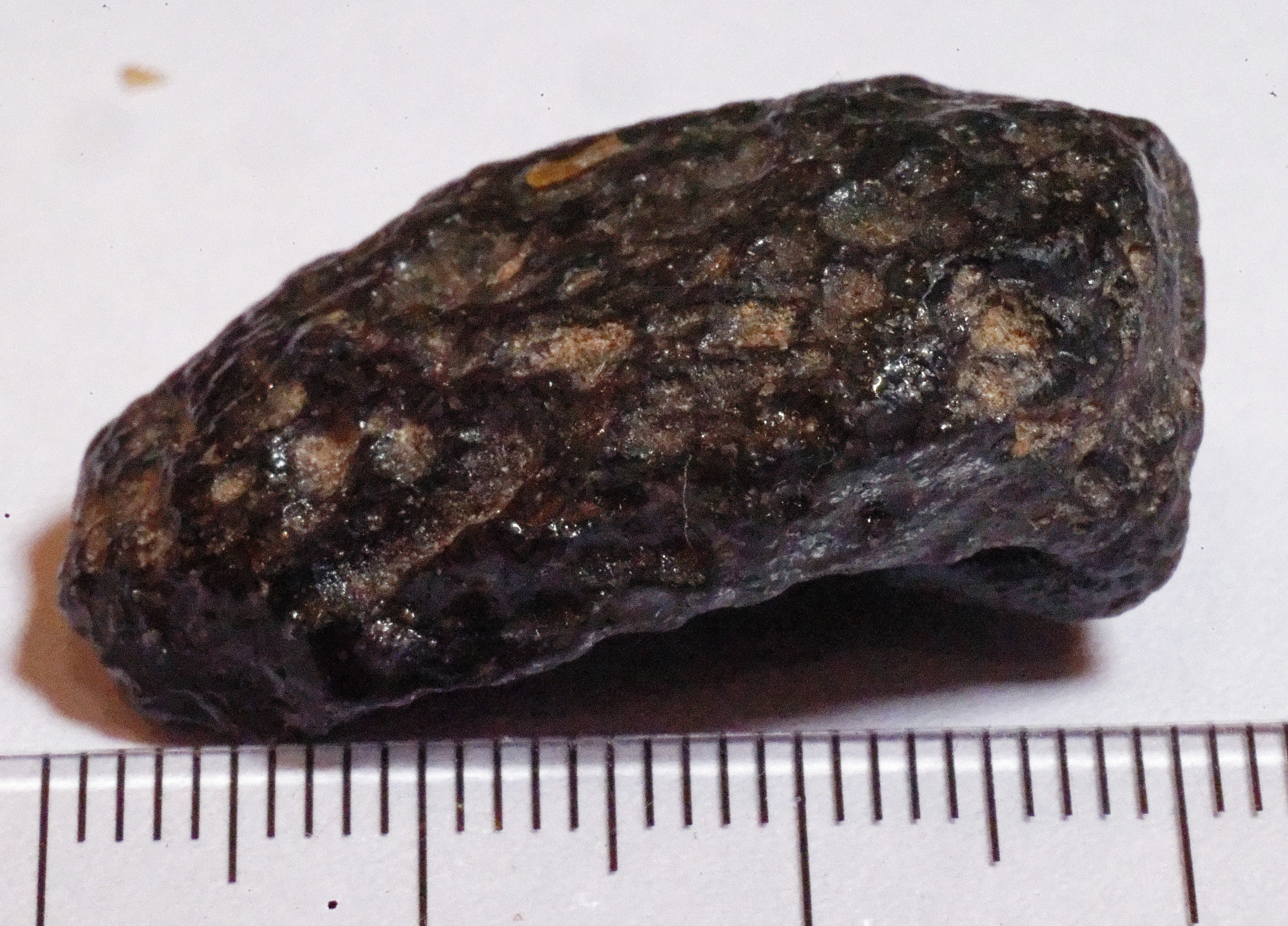
Tektite about 3cm long, mass 11 grams

Though the meteorite impact theory of tektite formation is widely accepted, there has been considerable controversy about their origin in the past. As early as 1897, Dutch geologist Rogier Diederik Marius Verbeek suggested an extraterrestrial origin for tektites: he proposed that they fell to Earth from the Moon. (Note: As early as 1893, the Australian geologist Victor Franz Paul Streich (? – 1905) suggested in a private letter to the German geologist Alfred Wilhelm Stelzner that the tektites of Australia had an extraterrestrial origin. See: Stelzner, A. W. (1893). "Supplementary notes on the above-named collection". Transactions of the Royal Society of South Australia. 16: 110–112. From p. 112: " "55B. Obsidian-bombs. Found between Everard Range and Fraser Range." Most decidedly not of cosmic origin, as suggested by you [i.e., Streich] in your private letter to me. At least so far there are no vitreous masses known to me of meteoric origin."; Stelzner, Alfred W. (1893). "Ueber eigenthümliche Obsidian-Bomben aus Australien" [On strange obsidian bombs from Australia]. Zeitschrift der Deutschen Geologischen Gesellschaft (in German). 45: 299–319. From p. 300: "Wieder Andere sind der Meinung, dass das Räthsel nur dadurch gelöst werden könne, dass man den "Bomben", obwohl sie eine von jenen aller anderen bekannten Aërolithen sehr abweichende Beschaffenheit zeigen, trotzdem einen kosmischen Ursprung zuschreibe." (Again, others are of the opinion that the puzzle can be solved only by ascribing to the "bombs" a cosmic origin, although they show a nature that deviates greatly from those of all other known aeroliths.)) Verbeek's proposal was seconded by Austrian geologist Franz Eduard Suess. Subsequently, it was argued that tektites consist of material that was ejected from the Moon by major hydrogen-driven lunar volcanic eruptions and then drifted through space to later fall to Earth as tektites.

The major proponents of the lunar origin of tektites include NASA scientist John A. O'Keefe, NASA aerodynamicist Dean R. Chapman, meteorite and tektite collector Darryl Futrell, and long-time tektite researcher Hal Povenmire. From the 1950s to the 1990s, O'Keefe argued for the lunar origin of tektites based upon their chemical, i.e. rare-earth, isotopic, and bulk, composition and physical properties. Chapman used complex orbital computer models and extensive wind tunnel tests to argue that the so-called Australasian tektites originated from the Rosse ejecta ray of the large crater Tycho on the Moon's near side. O'Keefe, Povenmire, and Futrell claimed on the basis of behavior of glass melts that the homogenization of silica melts (which is called "fining") that characterize tektites could not be explained by the terrestrial-impact theory. They also argued that the terrestrial-impact theory could not explain the vesicles and extremely low water and other volatile content of tektites. Futrell reported the presence of microscopic internal features within tektites, which argued for a volcanic origin.

At one time, theories advocating the lunar origin of tektites enjoyed considerable support as part of a spirited controversy about the origin of tektites that occurred during the 1960s. Starting with the publication of research concerning lunar samples returned from the Moon, the consensus of Earth and planetary scientists shifted in favor of theories advocating a terrestrial impact versus lunar volcanic origin. For example, one problem with the lunar origin theory is that the arguments for it that are based upon the behavior of glass melts use data from pressures and temperatures that are uncharacteristic of and unrelated to the conditions of hypervelocity impacts. In addition, various studies have shown that hypervelocity impacts are capable of producing low-volatile melts with extremely low water content. The consensus of Earth and planetary scientists regards the chemical, i.e. rare-earth, isotopic, and bulk composition evidence as decisively demonstrating that tektites are derived from terrestrial crustal rock, i.e. sedimentary rocks, that are unlike any known lunar crust.

== See also ==
- Black Stone in Mecca – maybe a tektite
- Darwin glass
- Edeowie glass
- Fulgurite
- Libyan desert glass

== Sources ==
=== Books ===
- Barnes, V., and M. Barnes (1973) Tektites. Dowden, Hutchinson, & Ross, Inc., New York, New York. 444 pp. ISBN 0-87933-027-9
- Bouska, Vladimir (1994). Moldavites: The Czech Tektites. Stylizace, Prague, Czechoslovakia. 69 pp.
- Heinen, Guy (1998) Tektites – Witnesses Of Cosmic Catastrophes. Guy Heinen, Luxembourg. 222 pp.
- McCall, G.J.H. (2001) Tektites in the Geological Record. The Geological Society of London, London, United Kingdom. 256 pp. ISBN 1-86239-085-1
- McNamara, K., and A. Bevan (1991) Tektites, 2nd ed. Western Australian Museum, Perth, Western Australia, Australia. 28 pp.
- O'Keefe, J. A. (1976) Tektites And Their Origin. Elsevier Scientific Publishing Company, Amsterdam, Netherlands. 266 pp. ISBN 0-44441-350-2
- Povenmire, Hal (2003) Tektites: A Cosmic Enigma. Florida Fireball Network, Indian Harbour Beach, Florida. 209 pp.
