= Darwin glass =

Natural tektite glass found in Tasmania

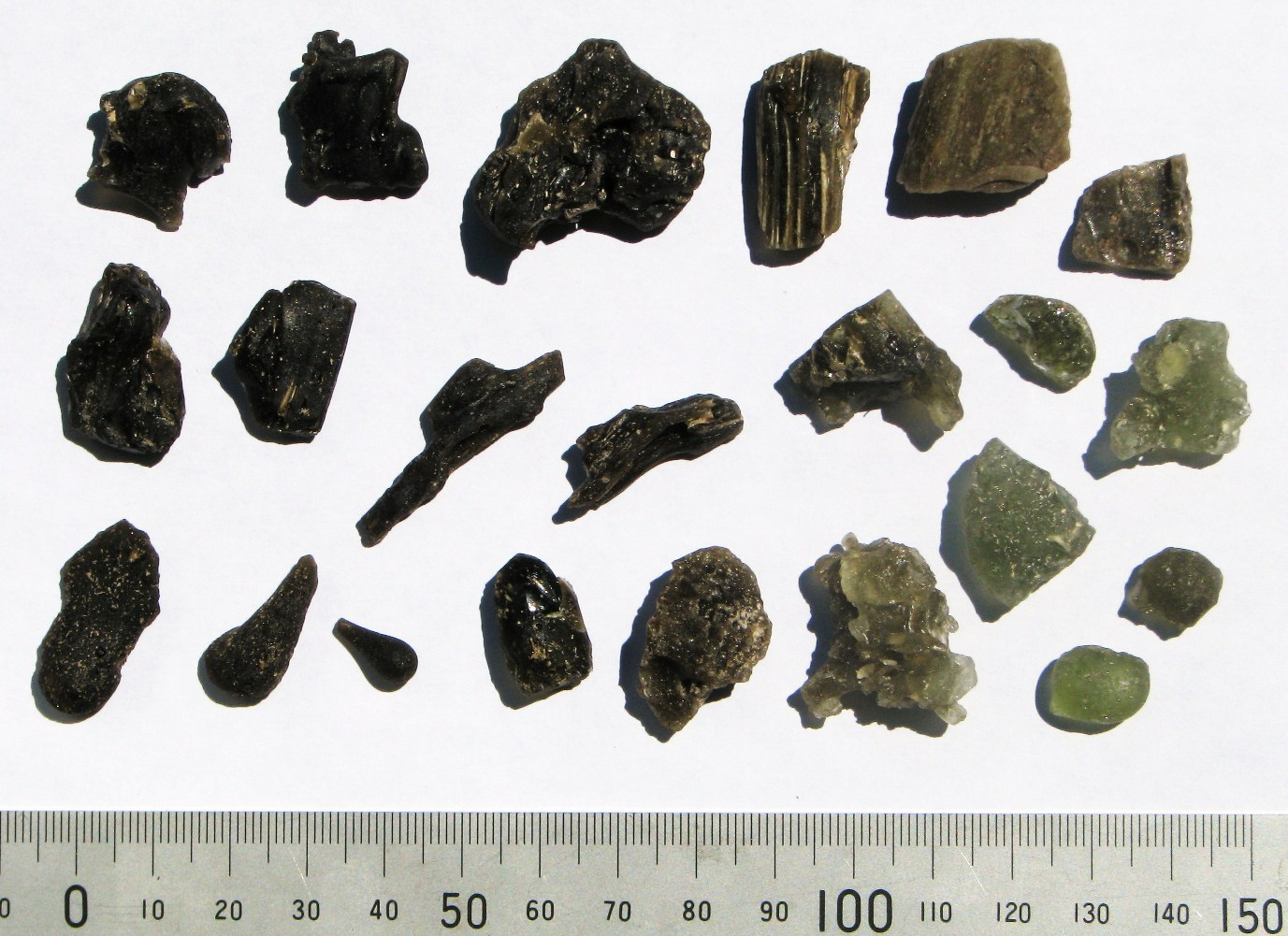
Assorted fragments of Darwin glass (scale in mm)

Darwin glass or tasmanite, one of the types of tasmanian tektites, is a natural glass found south of Queenstown in West Coast, Tasmania. It takes its name from Mount Darwin in the West Coast Range, where it was first reported, and later gave its name to Darwin Crater, a probable impact crater, and the inferred source of the glass.

== Occurrence ==
Fragments of Darwin glass are found scattered over a 410 km^{2} (160 miles squared) area. Such an area is called a strewn field. On slopes and flat ground between 250 and 500 m elevation, the glass occurs with quartzite fragments buried under peat and soil. The peat is normally around 20 cm thick, and the quartzite fragment horizon is typically 30 cm thick. On mountain peaks higher than 500 m, the bedrock is directly exposed to the air, and Darwin glass occurs occasionally on the surface. In valleys below 220 m the Darwin glass is buried below peat and sediments. The glass occurs north, west and south from the crater. Its distribution extends to Kelly Basin and the lower northeast shore of Macquarie Harbour. Northwards it extends almost to the Lyell Highway and Crotty Dam. Darwin glass is rare in the crater itself.

In controlled excavations of gravel deposits the abundance of Darwin glass was found to vary from 0.3 to 47 kg/m^{3}. The highest abundance was found about 2 km from the crater, with the average abundance estimated at 3.4 kg/m^{3} of gravel over a 50 km^{2} study area near the crater. From this it can be estimated that about 25000 tons of Darwin glass, or about 10000 m^{3}, occurs in this 50 km^{2} area. The amount of glass is large compared with the size of the crater. Preservation is helped by acid ground water which does not dissolve the glass, but this alone cannot explain the glass abundance. There is so much glass present that the glass must have been more copiously produced than in other meteorite impacts of similar size. This may be because of the presence of high amounts of volatiles such as water at the site, which would have magnified the impact and resulted in the creation of higher amounts of glass.

Organic compounds such as cellulose and polymers were trapped in the glass at the time of the impact, preserving remnants of plant life. The discovery of these preserved organic materials by scientists in 2013 has been cited as evidence for the fringe theory of panspermia, which posits that life could be spread between planets or solar system by impacts.

== Nature ==
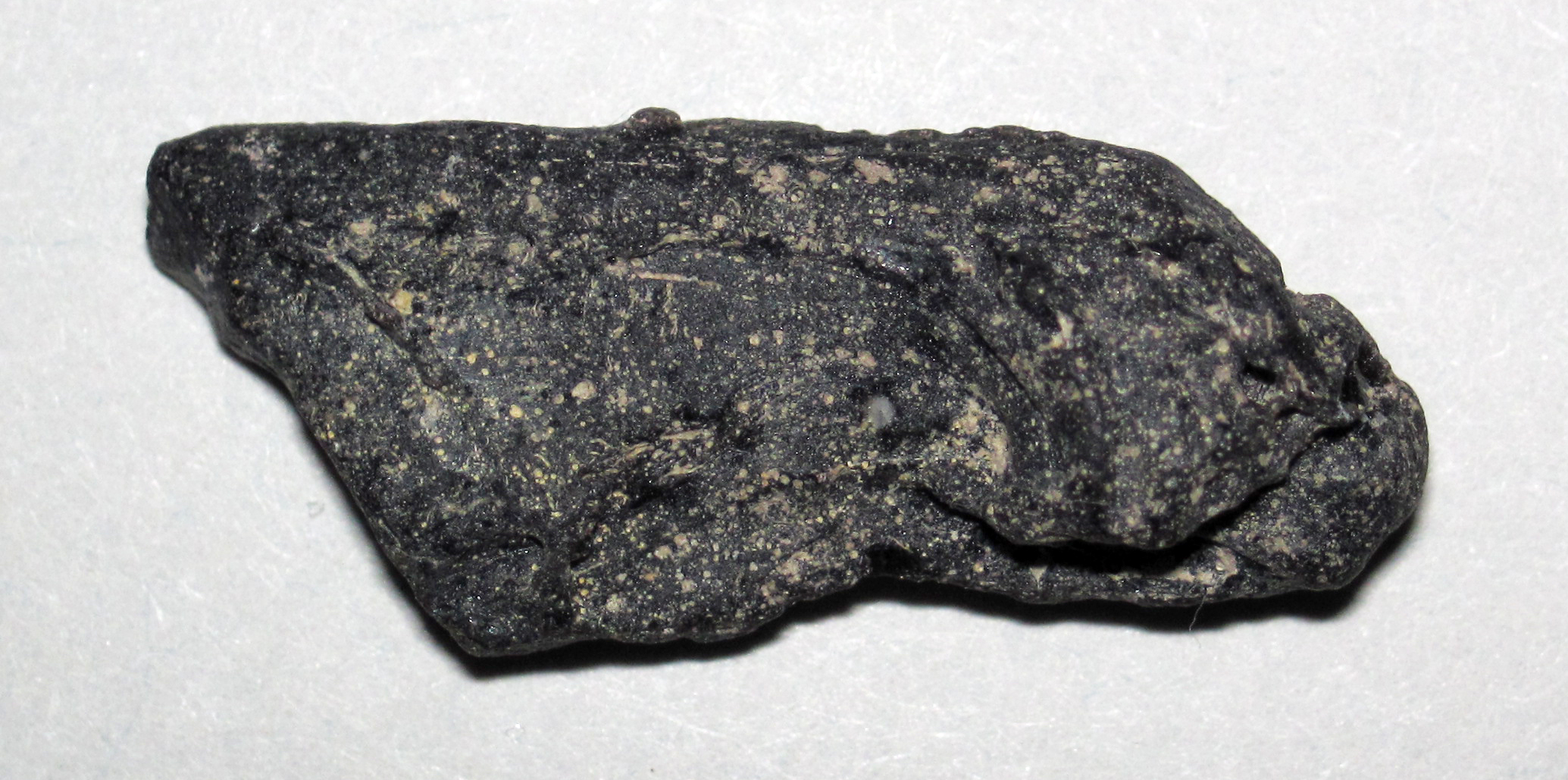
Darwin glass sample

The glass is light to dark green, white or black. The glass takes the form of twisted masses, fragments or chunks up to 10 cm. Internally it has a flowing texture defined by lines of elliptical bubbles. There are two kinds of Darwin glass when composition is measured. Type 1 is normally white or green whereas type 2 is normally black to dark green. The dark glass contains less silica and more magnesium and iron than the light green glass. The dark glass is also enriched in chromium, nickel and cobalt. A possible explanation for the chemical differences is that, in addition to being mainly composed of melted local metamorphic rocks, the type 2 glass also contains a component of extraterrestrial material from the meteorite. Darwin glass has been dated at about 816,000 years old using argon–argon dating method.

== Crater ==
The glass is an impactite resulting from the melting of local rocks due to the impact of a large meteorite. The assumed source is a 1.2-kilometer-wide topographic depression known as Darwin Crater. The crater is filled with 230 m of sediments and breccia. A crater of that size would be created by a meteorite 20 to 50 m in diameter and its impact with Earth would release 20 megatons of energy.

== Human use ==
Darwin glass was widely used by the Palawa as a material for toolmaking and trade.
