= Traces of Catastrophe =

Comprehensive technical reference on the science of impact craters

- Author: Bevan M. French
- Language: English
- Series: LPI Contribution No. 954
- Publisher: Lunar and Planetary Institute
- Publication date: 1998
- Publication place: US
- Media type: online (formerly print)
- Pages: 120
- OCLC: 40770730

Traces of Catastrophe: A Handbook of Shock-Metamorphic Effects in Terrestrial Meteorite Impact Structures is a book written by Bevan M. French of the Smithsonian Institution. It is a comprehensive technical reference on the science of impact craters. It was published in 1998 by the Lunar and Planetary Institute (LPI), which is part of the Universities Space Research Association (USRA). It was originally available in hard copy from LPI, but is now only available as a portable document format (PDF) (Note: This page uses the term PDF to mean either Portable Document Format for the e-book download, or planar deformation features for geological evidence of impact shock.) e-book free download.

The book has become very influential in the field of impact crater research, appearing as a common reference for papers and web sites on the topic. The Earth Impact Database lists it among the suggested reading on its introductory page about impact craters. The Impact Field Studies Group Impact Database says it is required reading before submitting an observation of a proposed impact site. NASA's Goddard Space Flight Center (GSFC) lists it among general references relevant to Planetary Science across the Solar System. NASA GSFC also has a Remote Sensing Tutorial site which calls Traces of Catastrophe an "exceptional summary of impact cratering."

== Overview ==
The book is divided into eight chapters.

Chapter 1 introduces impact craters, now recognized on Earth due to the study of other planetary bodies, most significantly the Moon. On Earth, impact craters differ from other processes in geology in being rare, from a release of extremely large amounts of energy, and happening in an instant. It contrasts with other geological forces that mostly take very long periods of time.

Chapter 2 covers the astronomical aspect with asteroids and comets. Historical impacts are discussed, including the Tunguska event of 1908. There is a table comparing effects from tiny to enormous meteor impacts.

Chapter 3 is about the process of formation of a crater during an impact event. The propagation of the shock wave leads to progressive stages of contact/compression, excavation and modification. It differentiates simple and complex craters, and multi-ring basins. Then it covers the erosion processes that continue after the crater has been made.

Chapter 4 is about shock metamorphism, the unique changes made to rocks by the extreme but brief shock forces of an impact. The effects include shatter cones, planar deformation features (PDFs), selective melting and many others. The amount of shock metamorphism in the rocks progresses in stages with the amount of pressure that they were exposed to, ranging from fracturing and brecciation to vaporization of the rocks and later condensation into glass.

Chapter 5 surveys various impactites, meaning shock-metamorphosed rocks, and where they are found in an impact structure based on the pressures in various parts of the cratering process. The topics include crater-fill breccias, ejecta blanket, pseudotachylite and impact melt breccias.

Chapter 6 covers impact melts, their volume relative to crater size, melt rocks in the crater, impact melt breccias, dikes & sills, and tektites.

Chapter 7 is about finding new impact structures. It includes search methods and verification using unique features of craters covered earlier.

Chapter 8 looks to the future, considers current problems and subjects for further study.

An appendix "Criteria for recognizing terrestrial impact structures" provides a checklist for use in verification of potential impact sites.
