= Meteorite shock stage =

Measure of the degree of fracturing of the matrix of a common chondrite meteorite

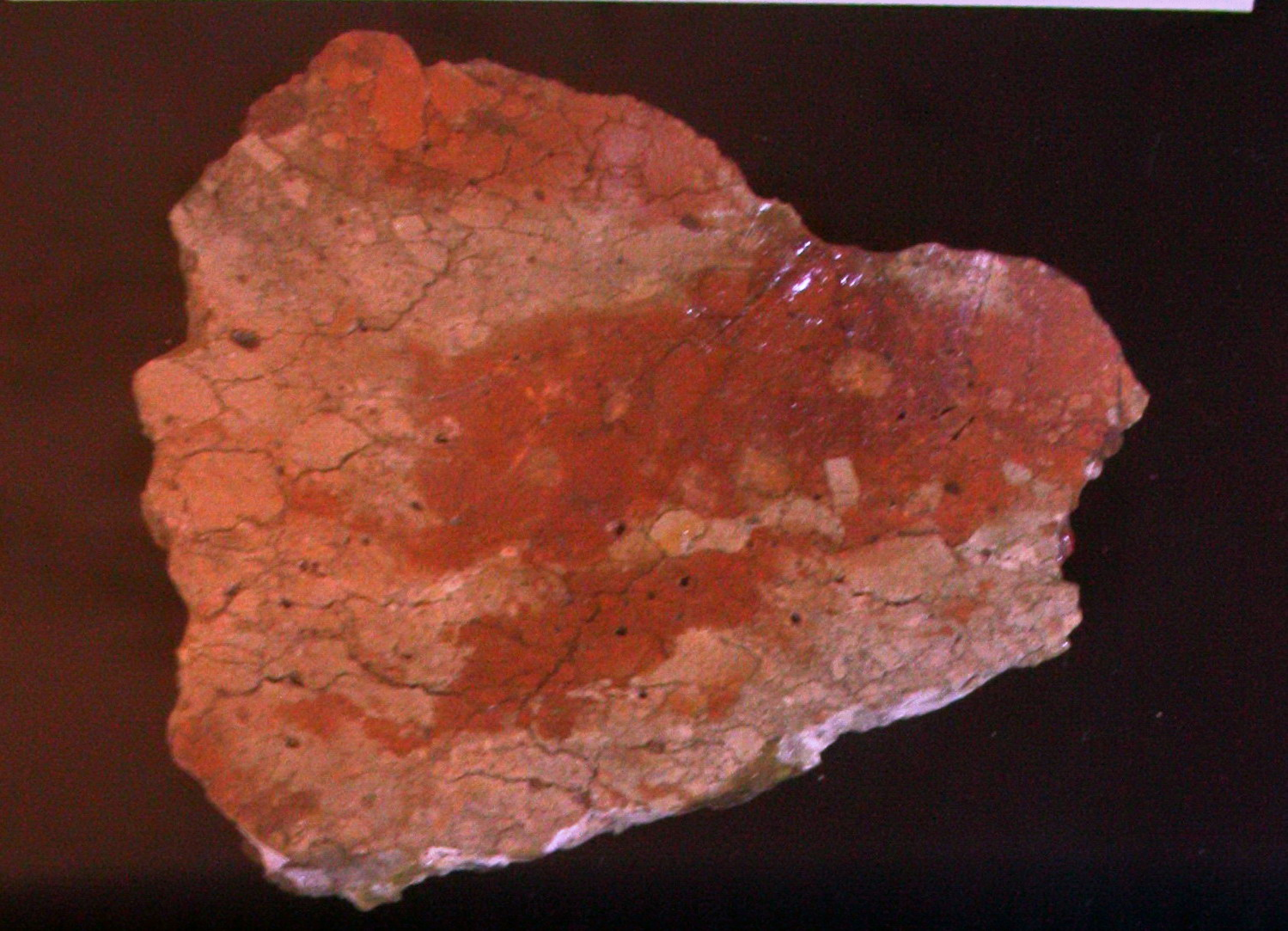
Shock stationed clay mineral from the Puchezh-Katunsky meteorite crater

Meteorite shock stage is a measure of the degree of fracturing of the matrix of a common chondrite meteorite. Impacts on the parent body of a meteoroid can produce very large pressures. These pressures heat, melt and deform the rocks. This is called shock metamorphism. Meteorites are often given a rating from 1 to 6 showing the level of shock metamorphism. However, the degree of shock can vary within a meteorite on the scale of centimeters.

Smaller bodies colliding with one another would not have sufficiently great impact velocity to produce the pressures and temperatures required to produce shock effects, due to their lesser gravitational attraction for one another. High instantaneous pressures, in excess of 5 GPa (1 GPa = 10,000 atmospheres), are necessary to produce shock metamorphism.

== Shock grade ==
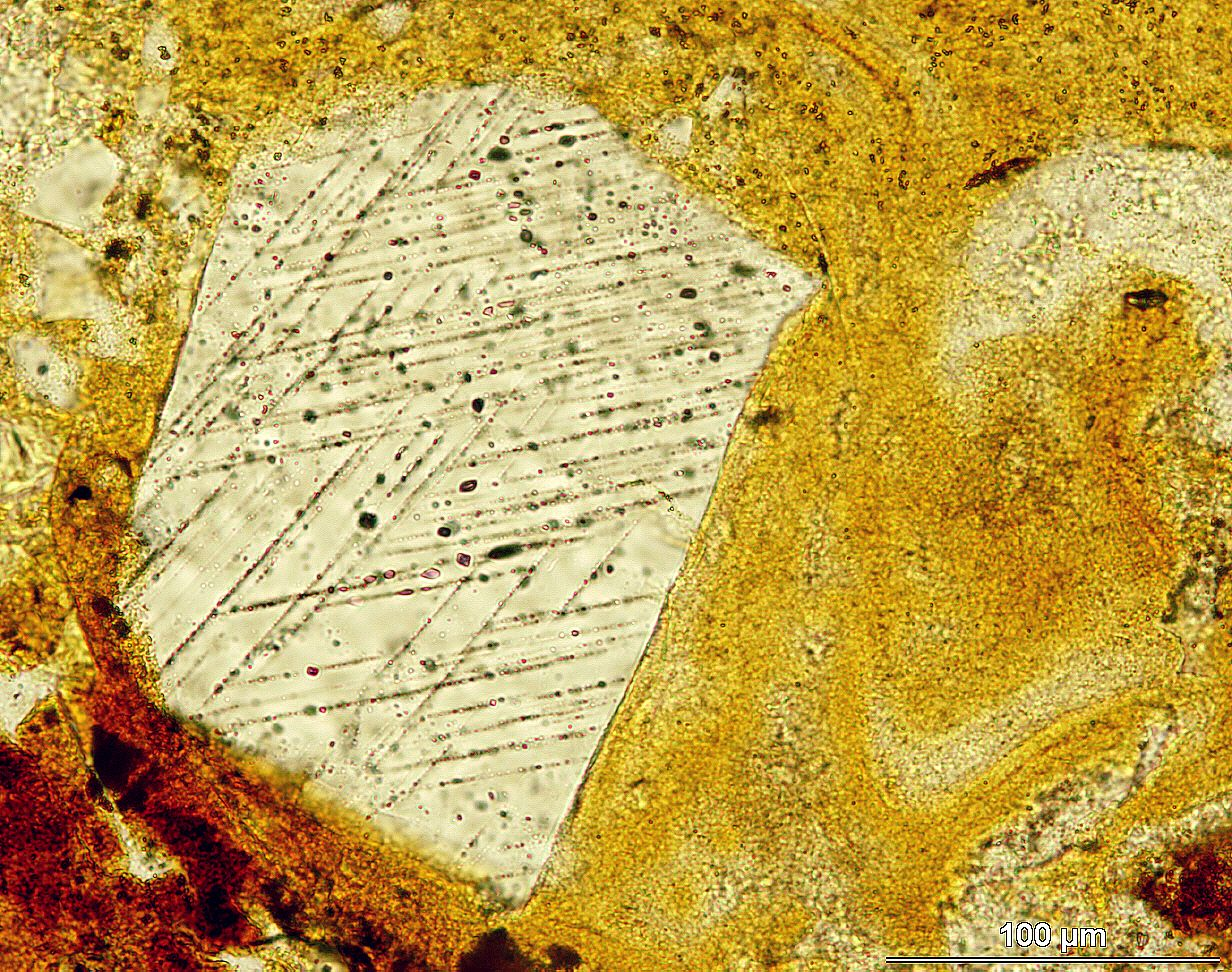
Shocked quartz with two sets of "decorated" planar deformation features in impact melt rock from the Suvasvesi impact crater. Planar deformation features are only produced by extreme shock compressions on the scale of meteor impacts. They are not found in volcanic environments.

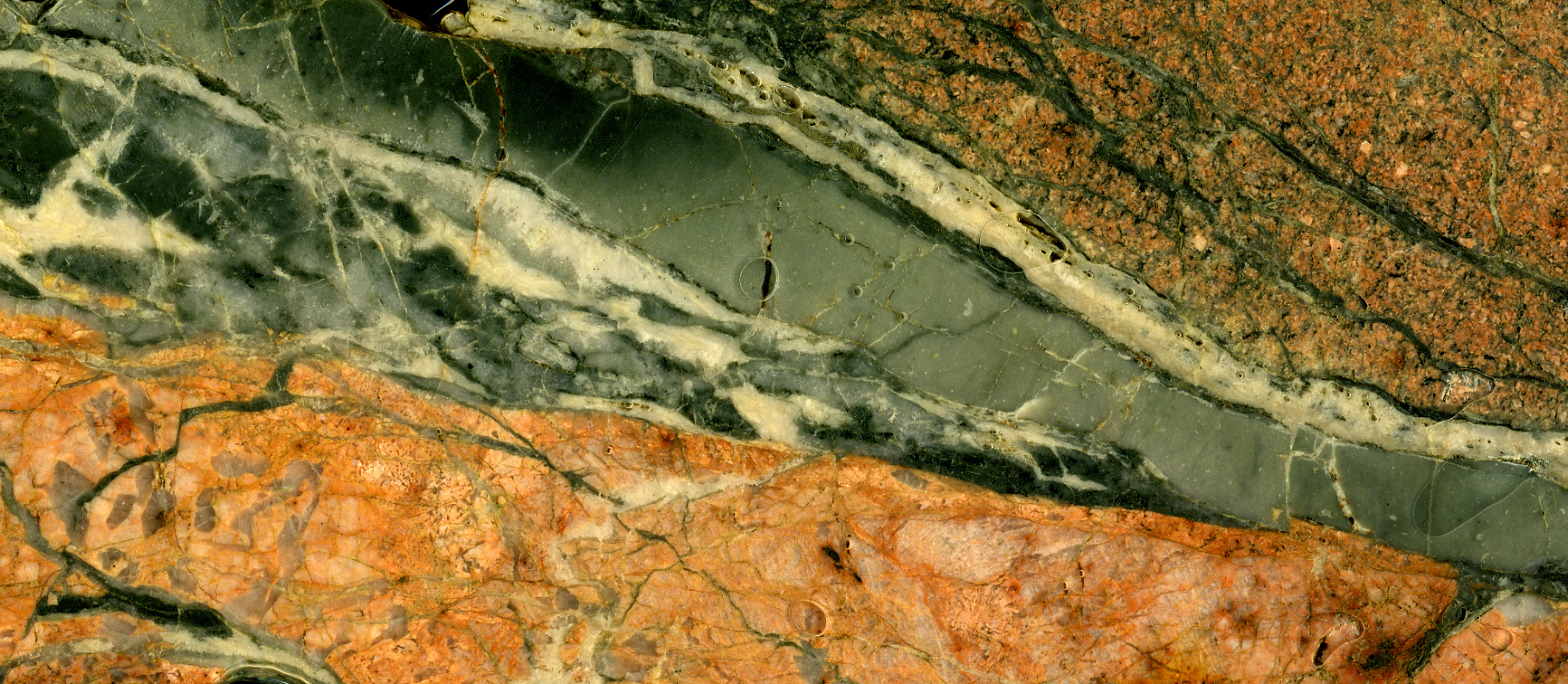
Impact-fractured granite (orangish areas - K-feldspar & quartz) with grayish- to blackish-colored impact pseudotachylite (impact melt) vein fillings

The fracturing of crystals and other features must be observed under a microscope with shock effects observed under polarized light. Larger structures, such as shock veins, are visible to the eye. Many of the shocked veins formed at the boundaries of polished surfaces of brecciated specimens exhibit intricate spider-web-like structures. Following is a summary of the shock grades:

- S1: completely unshocked (up to 5 GPa)
- S2: very weakly shocked (5-10 GPa); uneven darkening of olivine as seen under polarized light; planar and irregular fractures (breaks in other than a natural cleavage plane.)
- S3: weakly shocked (15-20 GPa); weak fractures in olivine seen under polarized light; dark shock veins and some melt pockets
- S4: moderately shocked; (30-35 GPa); weak planar fracturing of olivine under polarized light; some pockets of melted material, dark interconnected shock veins
- S5: strongly shocked (45-55 GPa); very strong planar fracturing and deformation features in olivine; alteration of plagioclase into maskelynite; formation of dark melt veins
- S6: very strongly shocked (75-90 GPa); olivine recrystallizes, with local alteration to a mineral called ringwoodite and shock melting of plagioclase to a glass

Greater shock pressures will melt the rock, producing what is referred to as an "impact melt". These are seldom found on Earth, so they are very much sought after by collectors.

== See also ==
- Glossary of meteoritics
- Meteorite classification
- Meteorite weathering
- Shock metamorphism
