= Vitrified sand =

Vitrified sand is sand that has been heated to a high enough temperature to undergo vitrification, which is the melting of the silicon dioxide or quartz that compose common sand. Vitrified sand is a type of natural glass, contrasted with manufactured glass in which soda ash or potash are added to lower the melting point. Pure quartz melts at 1,650 °C (3,002 °F). There are several natural processes that produce more or less melted sand and one man-made form:

- Fulgurite is sand fused by a lightning bolt hitting sand.
- Impactite such as tektite is sand fused by the compressive heat of a meteor strike including moldavite, a gem quality stone mined in some locations.
- Frit is partially fused sand plus other chemicals created in the process of glaze and glass making.
- Nuclear melt glass, formed by the detonation of a nuclear weapon. Examples include trinitite, created during the Trinity nuclear test.

Volcanic glass in many forms is not fused sand because it is formed from molten material.
