= Moldavite =

Green natural glass possibly formed by a meteorite impact

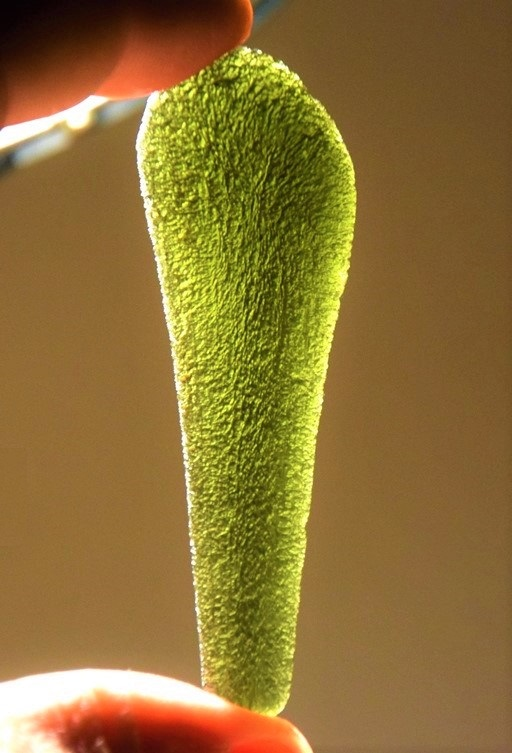
- Moldavite from Dobrkovská Lhotka

General
- Category: Glass
- Formula: SiO_{2}(+Al_{2}O_{3})
- Crystal system: Amorphous

Identification
- Color: Olive green
- Mohs scale hardness: 5.5 to 7
- Luster: Vitreous
- Diaphaneity: Opaque, translucent, transparent
- Specific gravity: 2.32 to 2.38
- Optical properties: Isotropic
- Refractive index: 1.48 to 1.54
- Birefringence: None
- Pleochroism: Absent
- Dispersion: None

Moldavite (Czech: vltavín) is a forest green, olive green or blue greenish vitreous silica projectile glass formed by a meteorite impact in southern Germany (Nördlinger Ries Crater) that occurred about 15 million years ago. It is a type of tektite and a gemstone. Material ejected from the impact crater includes moldavite, which was strewn across parts of Germany, the Czech Republic and Austria.

== Early studies ==
Moldavite was introduced to the scientific public for the first time in 1786 as "chrysolites" from Týn nad Vltavou in a lecture by Josef Mayer of Prague University, read at a meeting of the Bohemian Scientific Society (Mayer 1788). Zippe (1836) first used the term "moldavite", derived from the Vltava (Moldau) river in Bohemia (the Czech Republic), from where the first described pieces came.

== Origin ==
In 1900, Franz Eduard Suess pointed out that the gravel-size moldavites exhibited curious pittings and wrinkles on the surface, which could not be due to the action of water, but resembled the characteristic markings on many meteorites. He attributed the material to a cosmic origin and regarded moldavites as a special type of meteorite for which he proposed the name of tektite. Based on an analysis of 23 Bohemian and Moravian samples, in 1966 it was theorised that variations in their composition derived from fractional volatilization, and were not similar in origin to sedimentary or igneous rocks. Values were reported for a range of attributes: oxides, densities, and refractive values index. In 1987 it was recognised that moldavites were created following meteor impact which melted material and launched it into the air. As the material was airborne, it cooled and solidified. However, the plasma-like vapor at the impact site separated primary melt droplets from other residual vapour. The former then cooled into moldavite. In 2019 the first LIBS (Laser Induced Breakdown Spectroscopy) study on two typical moldavite samples, followed by routine EPMA (Electron Probe Microanalysis), indicated agreement with EPMA studies and also revealed siderophile elements (Chromium, Iron, Cobalt and Nickel).

Moldavites' highly textured surfaces are now known to be the result of pervasive etching by naturally occurring CO_{2} and humic acids present in groundwater. Because of their extremely low water content and chemical composition, the current consensus among earth scientists is that moldavites were formed about 14.7 million years ago during the impact of a giant meteorite in the present-day Nördlinger Ries crater. Currently, moldavites have been found in an area that includes southern Bohemia, western Moravia, the Cheb Basin (northwest Bohemia), Lusatia (Germany), and Waldviertel (Austria). Isotope analysis of samples of moldavites have shown a beryllium-10 isotope composition similar to the composition of Australasian tektites (australites) and Ivory Coast tektites (ivorites).

Most moldavites are from South Bohemian localities, with just a few found in South Moravian localities. Rare moldavites have been found in the Lusatian area (near Dresden), Cheb basin area (West Bohemia) and Northern Austria (near Radessen), with a few examples found in Southwestern Poland (Lower Silesia) which are thought to have been transported from the Lusitanian sub-strewn field. Principal occurrences of moldavites in Bohemia are associated with Tertiary sediments of the České Budějovice and Třeboň basins. The most prominent localities are concentrated in a NW-SE strip along the western margin of the České Budějovice Basin. The majority of these occurrences are bound to the Vrábče Member and Koroseky Sandy Gravel. Prominent localities in the Třeboň Basin are bound to gravels and sands of the Domanín Formation.

In Moravia, moldavite occurrences are restricted to an area roughly bounded by the towns of Třebíč, Znojmo and Brno. The colour of Moravian moldavites usually differs from their Bohemian counterparts, as it tends to be brownish. Taking into account the number of pieces found, Moravian localities are considerably less productive than the Bohemian ones; however, the average weight of the moldavites found is much higher. The oldest (primary) moldavite-bearing sediments lie between Slavice and Třebíč. The majority of other localities in southern Moravia are associated with sediments of Miocene as well as Pleistocene rivers that flowed across this area more or less to the southeast, similar to the present streams of Jihlava, Oslava and Jevišovka.

== Properties ==
The chemical formula of moldavite is SiO_{2}(+Al_{2}O_{3}). Its properties are similar to those of other types of glass, and reported Mohs hardness varies from 5.5 to 7. Moldavite can be transparent or translucent with a mossy green color, with swirls and bubbles accentuating its mossy appearance. Moldavites can be distinguished from most green glass imitations by observing their worm-like lechatelierite (an amorphous non-crystalline mineraloid silica glass), and flow marks (schlieren).

== Use ==
Moldavites were discovered by prehistoric people in the Czech Republic and Austria and were used to make flaked tools. Some of the worked moldavites date to the Aurignacian period of the Upper Paleolithic, approximately 43,000 to 26,000 years before the present.

In the modern world, moldavites are often used, rough or cut, as semi-precious stones in jewelry. They have purported metaphysical qualities and are often used in crystal healing. The price of moldavite specimens has been rising in recent years in particular because of its increasing popularity for metaphysical uses.

== Presentation ==
There is the Moldavite Museum in Český Krumlov, Czech Republic.

== Gallery ==
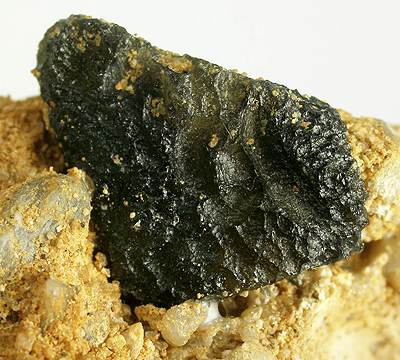
Rough moldavite

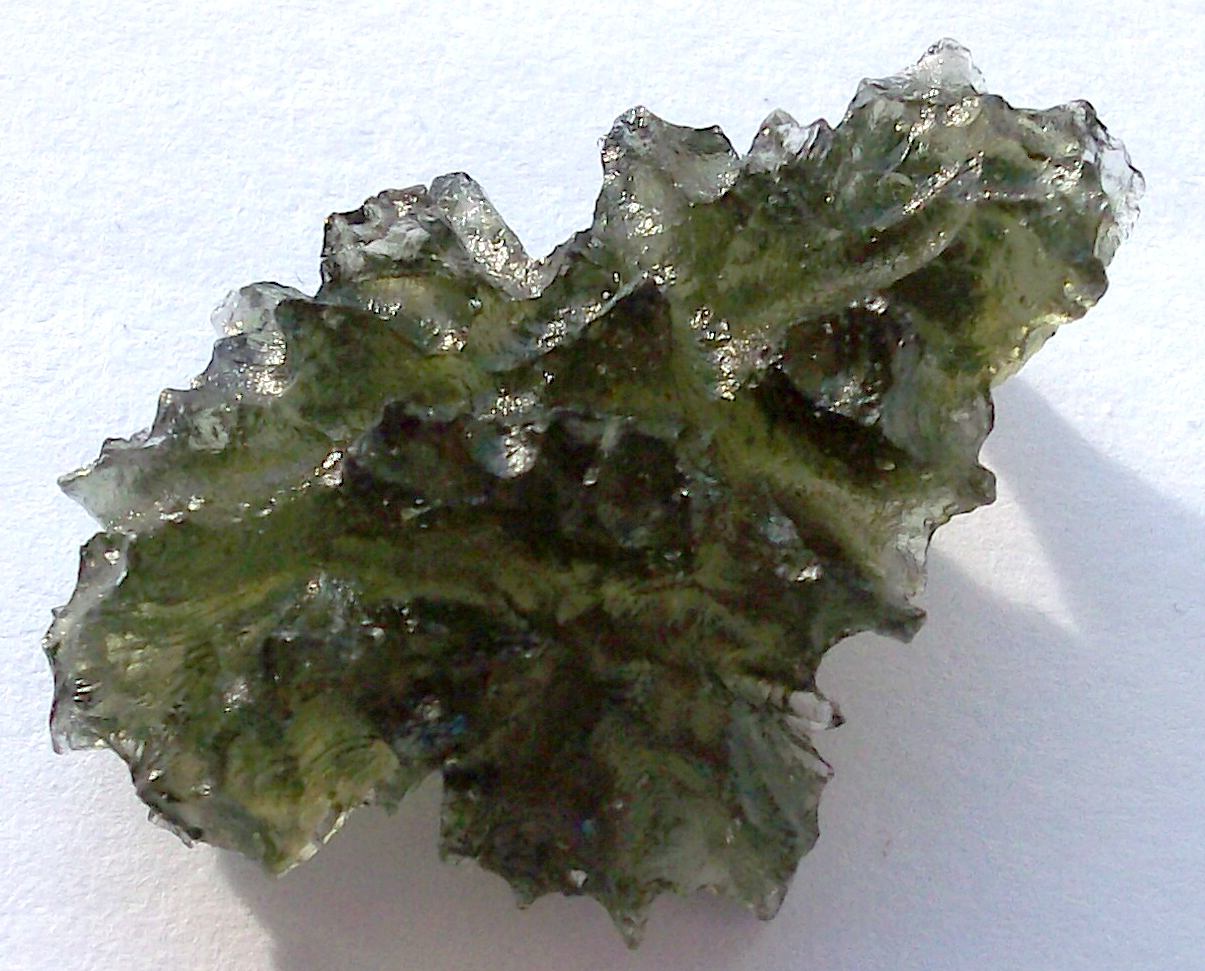
Moldavite, Czech Republic

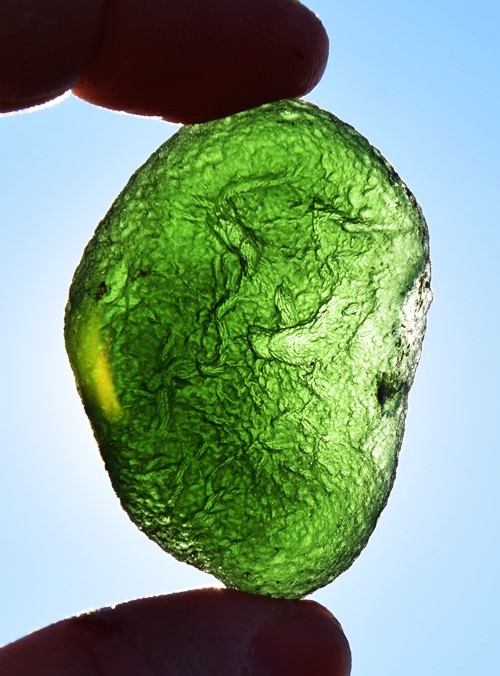
Moldavite, Czech Republic

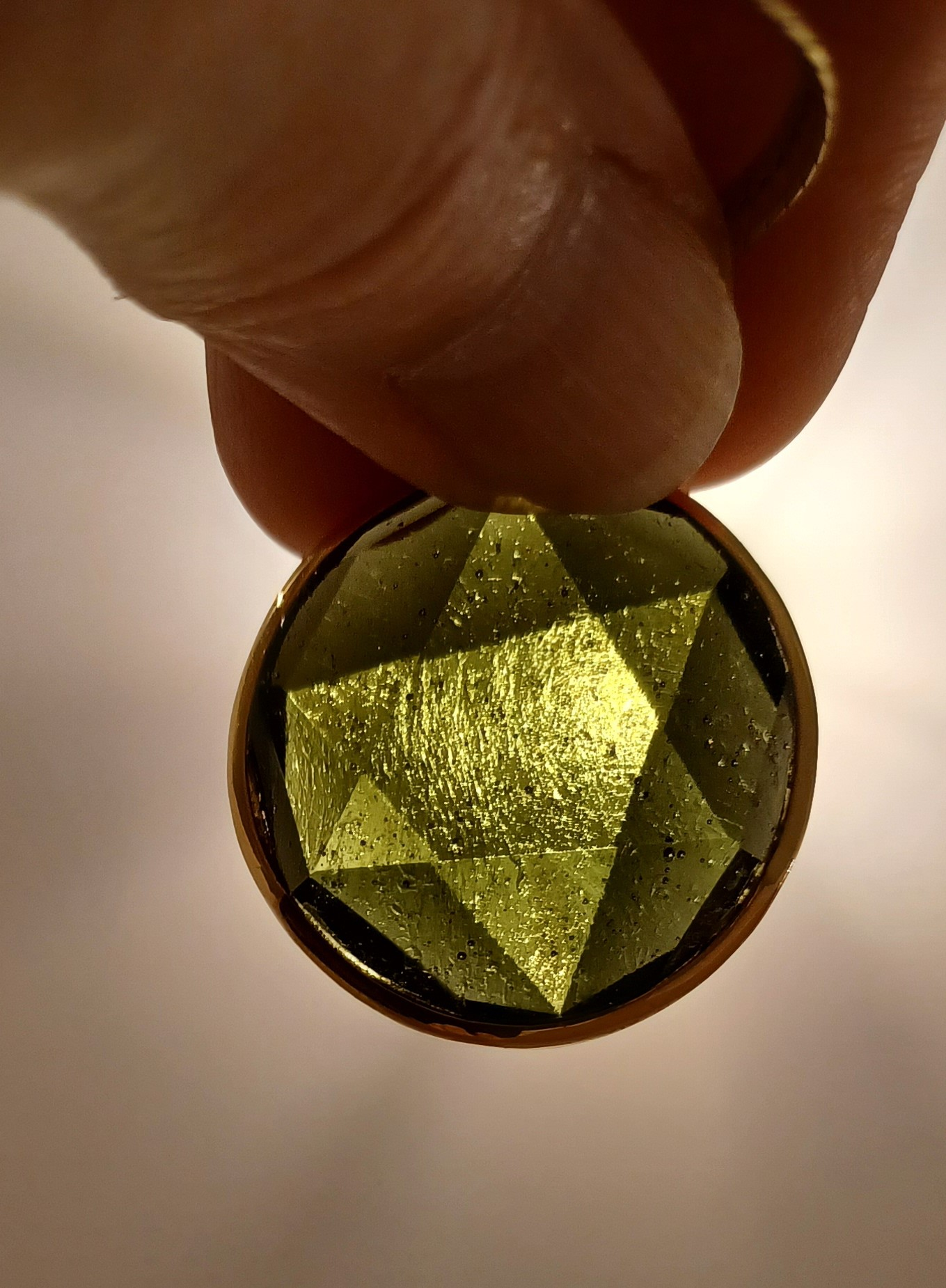
Moldavite cut and set as pendant and showing inclusions
