= Vrabce =

Vrabce may refer to:

- Vrábče, a municipality and village in the Czech Republic
- Vrabče, a village in Slovenia
