= Suevite =

Rock consisting partly of melted material formed during an impact event

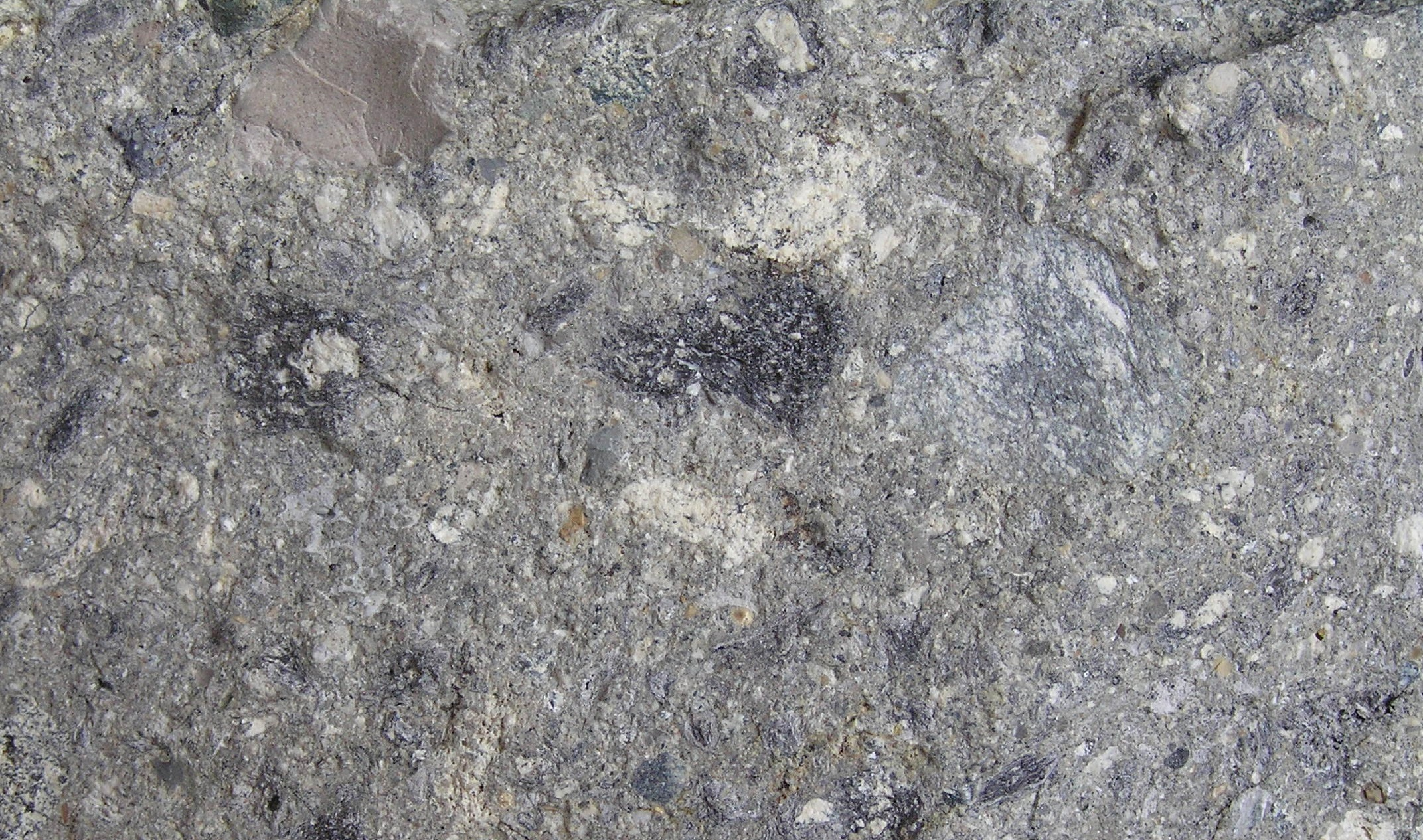
Suevite from the Nördlinger Ries impact crater (type locality)

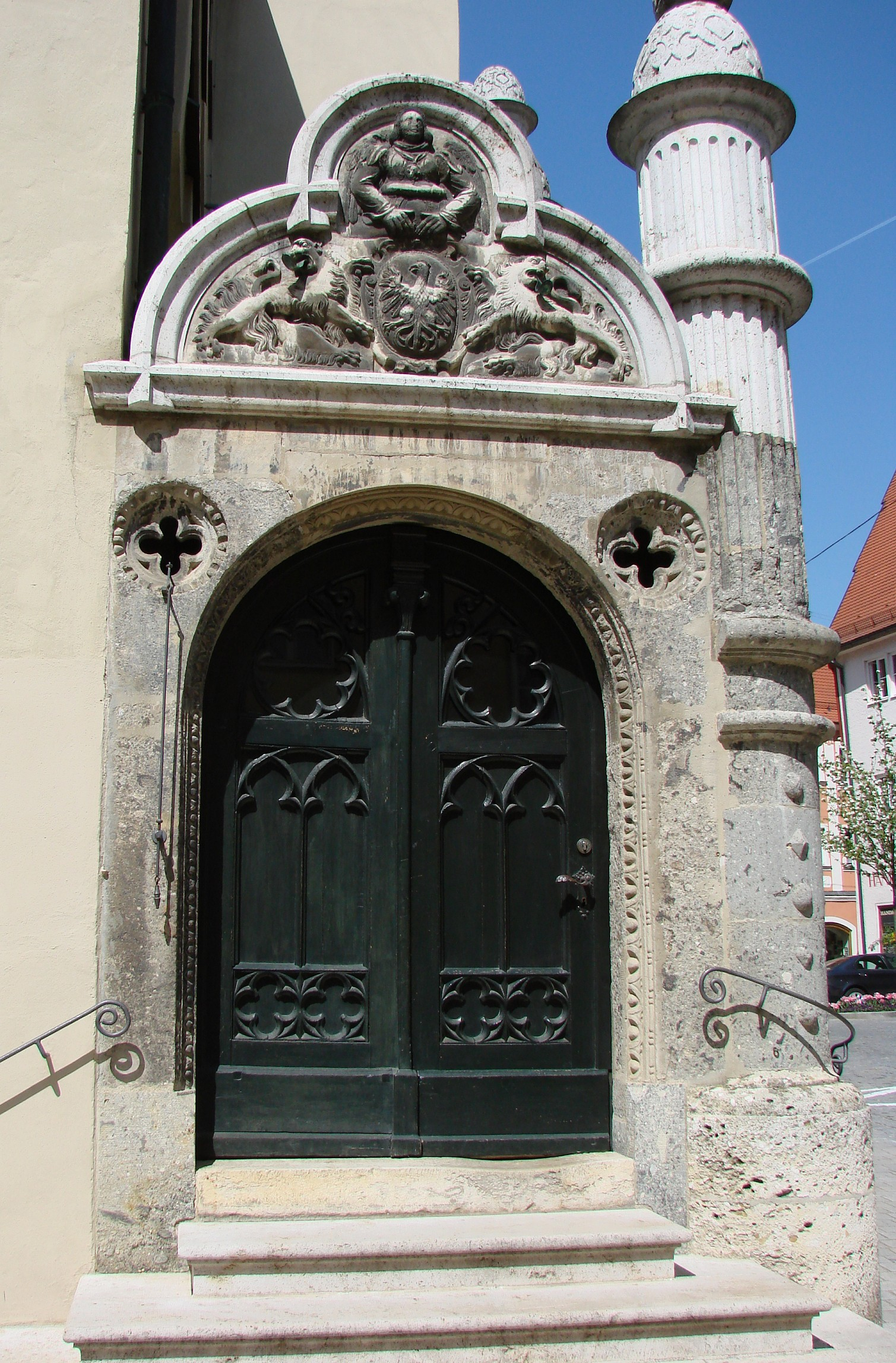
Portal to the town hall's stairway made of suevite in Nördlingen, Germany

Suevite is a rock consisting partly of melted material, typically forming a breccia containing glass and crystal or lithic fragments, formed during an impact event. It forms part of a group of rock types and structures that are known as impactites.

== Name ==
The word "suevite" is derived from "Suevia", Latin name of Swabia. The geologist Oliver Sachs was able to show that, over the course of the 19th and 20th centuries, this type of rock was recognized as something special and, in 1919, was formally introduced into petrographic science by Adolf Sauer under the name "suevite".

== Formation ==
Suevite is thought to form in and around impact craters by the sintering of molten fragments together with unmelted clasts of the country rock. Rocks formed from more completely melted material found in the crater floor are known as tagamites. Suevite is distinct from the pseudotachylite in an impact structure as the latter is thought to have formed by frictional effects within the crater floor and below the crater during the initial compression phase of the impact and the subsequent formation of the central uplift.

== Occurrence ==
Suevite is one of the diagnostic rock-types for large impact structures. It has been described from many of the larger impact structures identified on earth.

- Nördlinger Ries
- Sudbury Basin
- Popigai impact structure
- Chicxulub crater
- Kara crater
- Gardnos crater
- Lake Lappajärvi
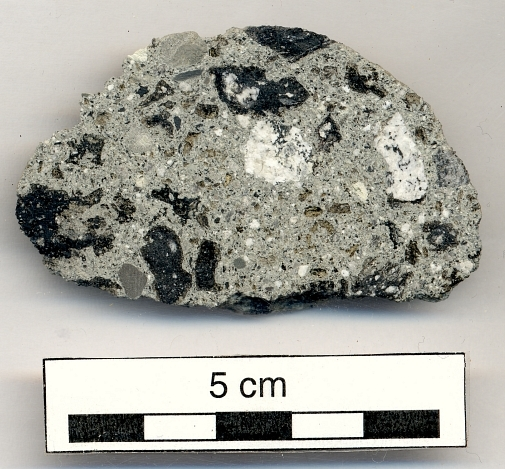
Suevite from an impact crater at Lahojsk, Belarus

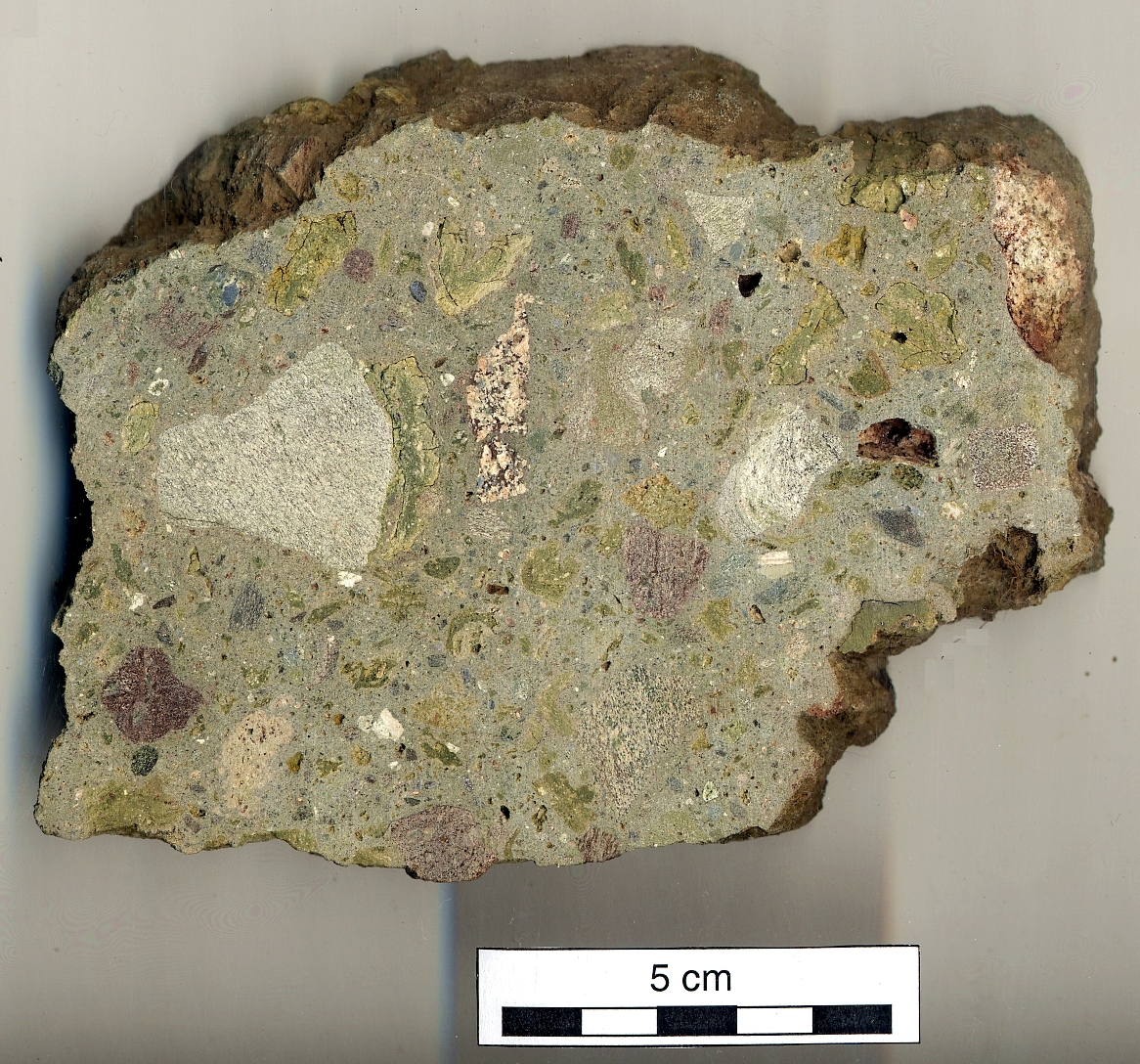
Greenish suevite from an impact structure at Rochechouart, France

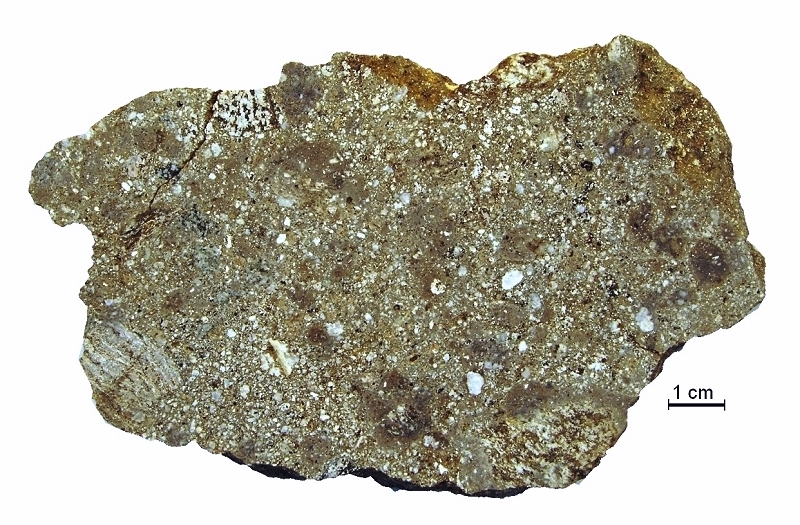
Suevite from the Manicouagan impact structure, Quebec, Canada

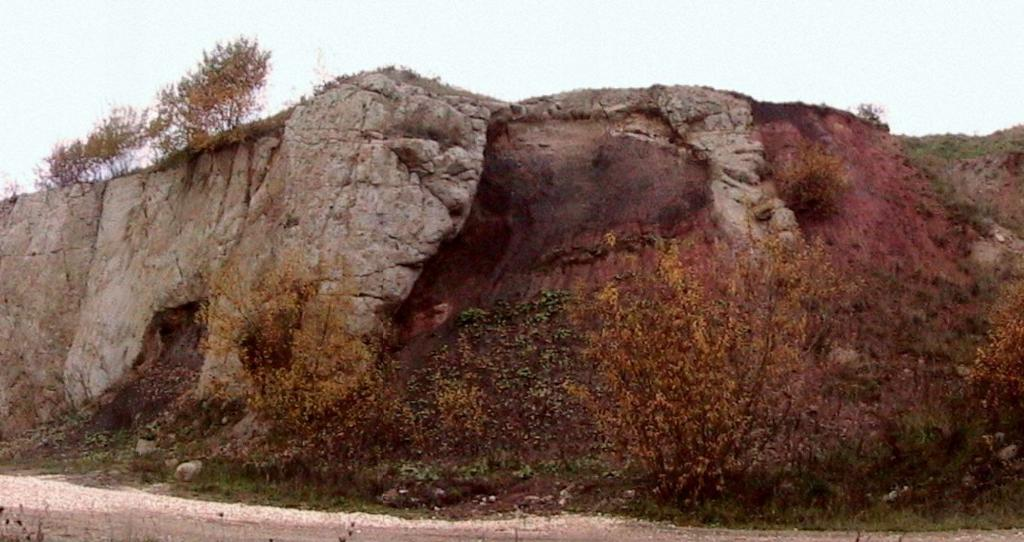
A thick layer of suevite (light gray) over blocks of Bunte Breccia (here mostly made up of reddish clay)

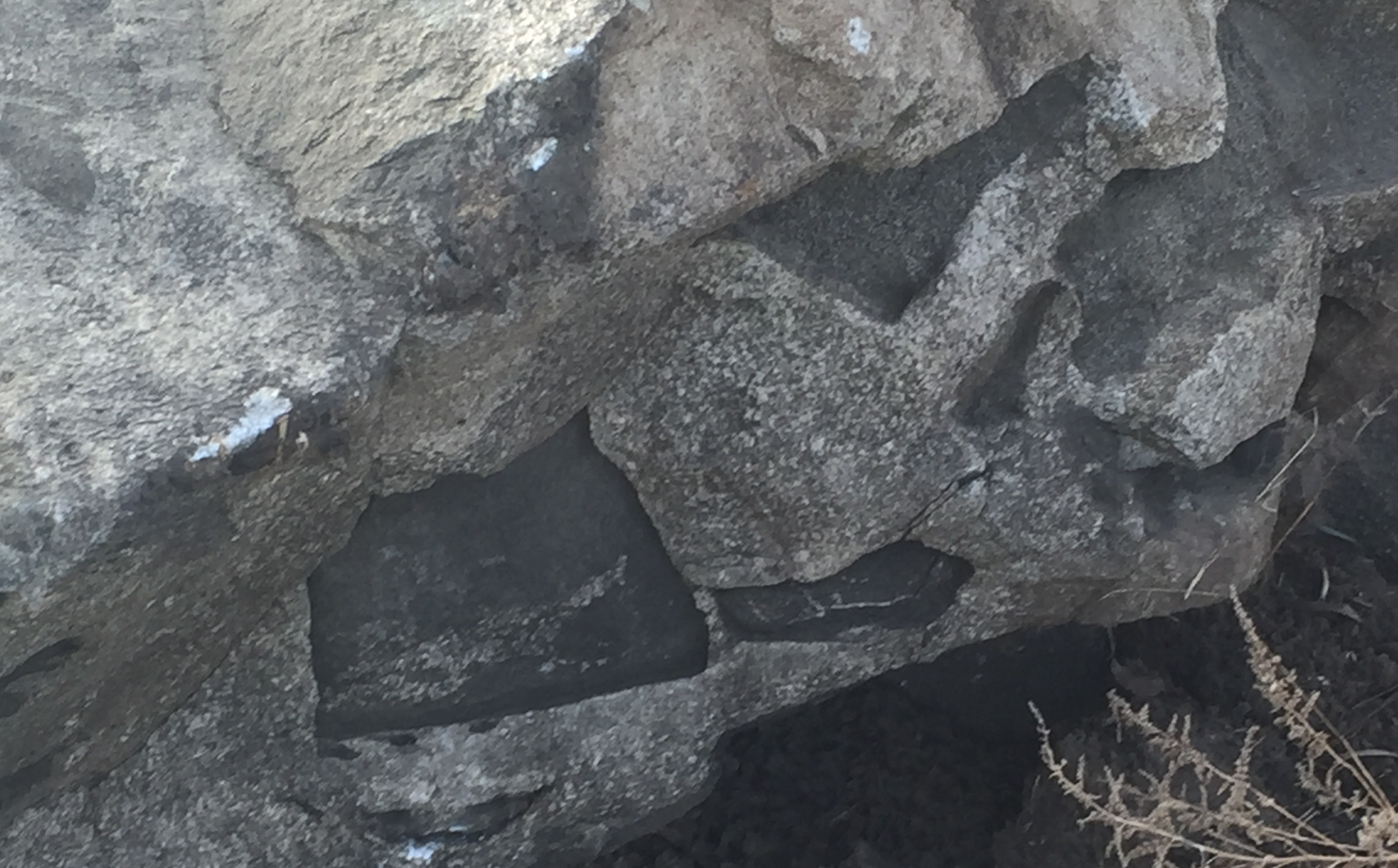
Suevite breccia from Sudbury impact event. The largest clast in the lower left center is 9" across.

== See also ==
- Meteorite shock stage
- Shock metamorphism
