= Impactite =

Rock created or modified by impact of a meteorite

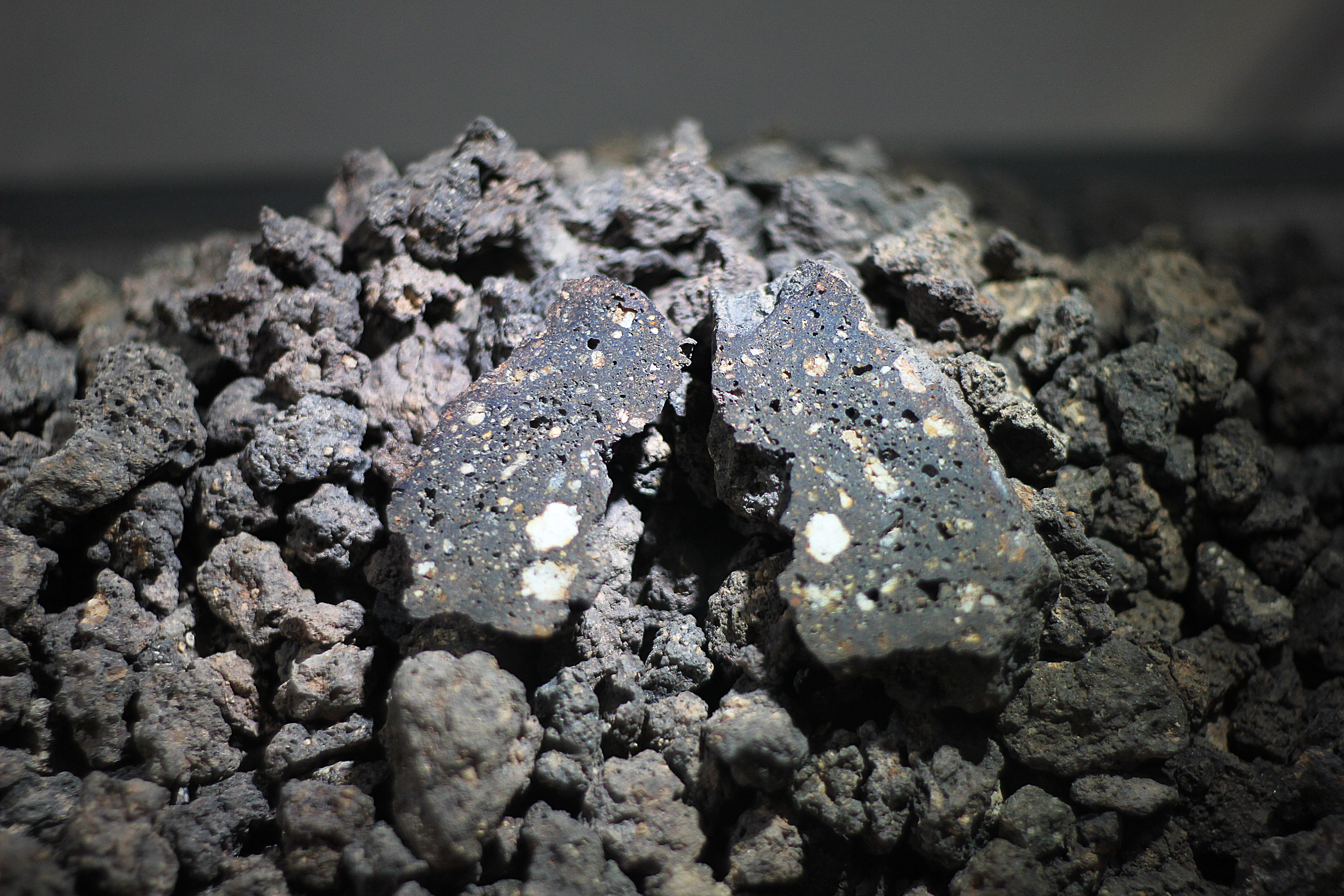
An example of impactite on Earth (from Monturaqui impact crater, Chile)

Impactite is rock created or modified by one or more impacts of a meteorite. Impactites are considered metamorphic rock, because their source materials were modified by the heat and pressure of the impact. On Earth, impactites consist primarily of modified terrestrial material, sometimes with pieces of the original meteorite.

== Formation ==
When a large meteorite hits a planet, it can radically deform the rocks and regolith that it hits. The heat, pressure, and shock of the impact changes these materials into impactite. Only very massive impacts generate the heat and pressure needed to transform a rock, so impactites are created rarely.

== Characteristics ==
Impactite includes shock-metamorphosed target rocks, melts (suevites) and mixtures of the two, as well as sedimentary rocks with significant impact-derived components (shocked mineral grains, tektites, anomalous geochemical signatures, etc.). In June 2015, NASA reported that impact glass has been detected on the planet Mars. Such material may contain preserved signs of ancient life—if life existed. Impactites are generally classified into three groups: shocked rocks, impact melt, and impact breccias.

=== Shocked rock ===
Shocked rocks have been transformed by shock metamorphism caused by the impact. They include shatter cones and high-pressure minerals, for example coesite and stishovite.

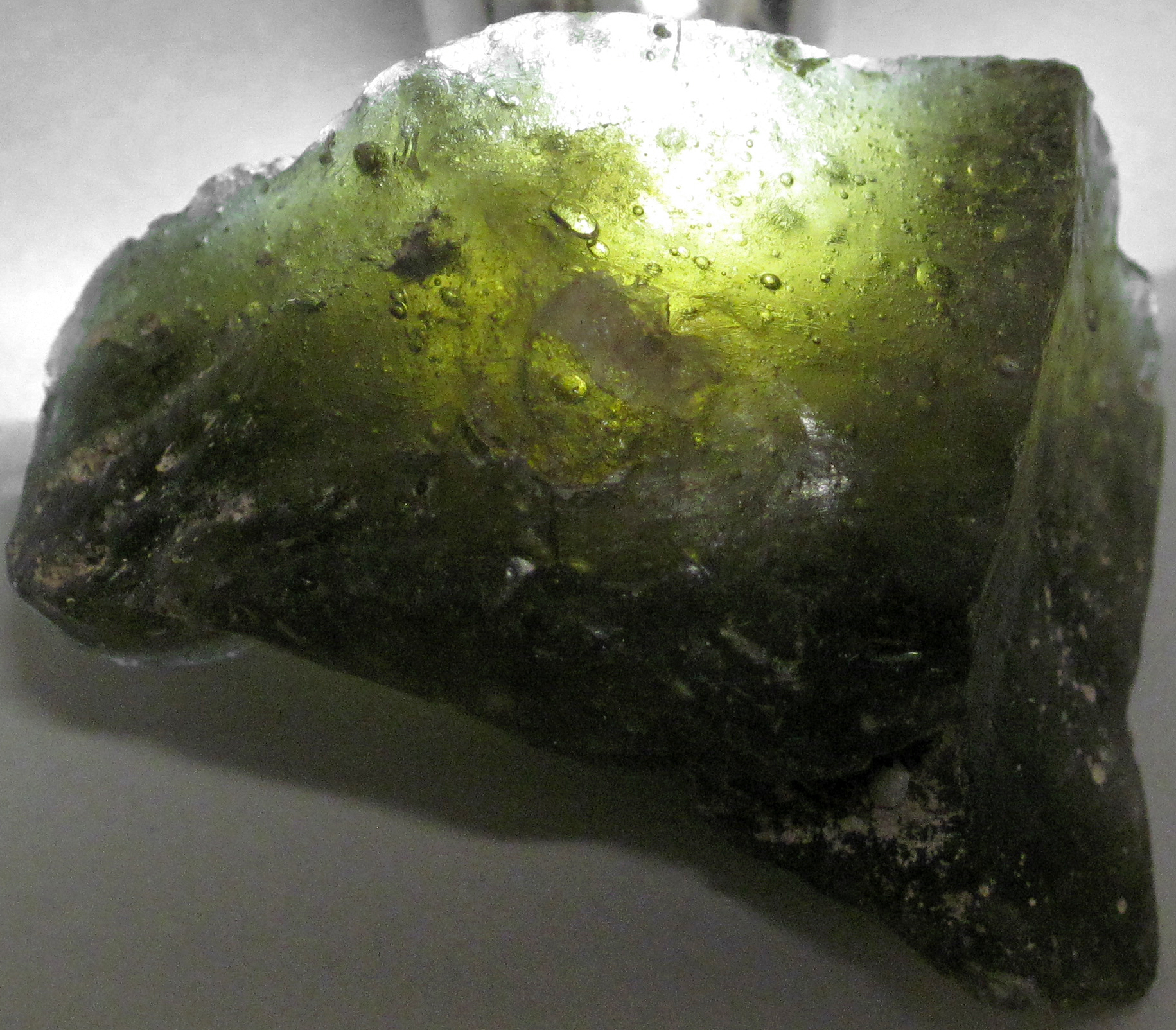
An example of impact glass (Darwin glass) from the Pleistocene, near Darwin Crater, Tasmania

=== Impact melts ===
When a meteor strikes a planet's surface, the energy released from the impact can melt rock and regolith into a liquid. When the liquid cools it forms a solid known as an impact melt. If the liquid solidifies quickly before the atoms arrange into a crystal lattice, it forms an impact glass. Impact glass can be dark brown, almost black, and partly transparent. Sometimes, the cooled liquid does form a crystal structure. In that case, it would still be considered an impact melt, but not an impact glass.

==== Tektites ====
Tektites are a rare kind of impact glass.

=== Impact breccias ===
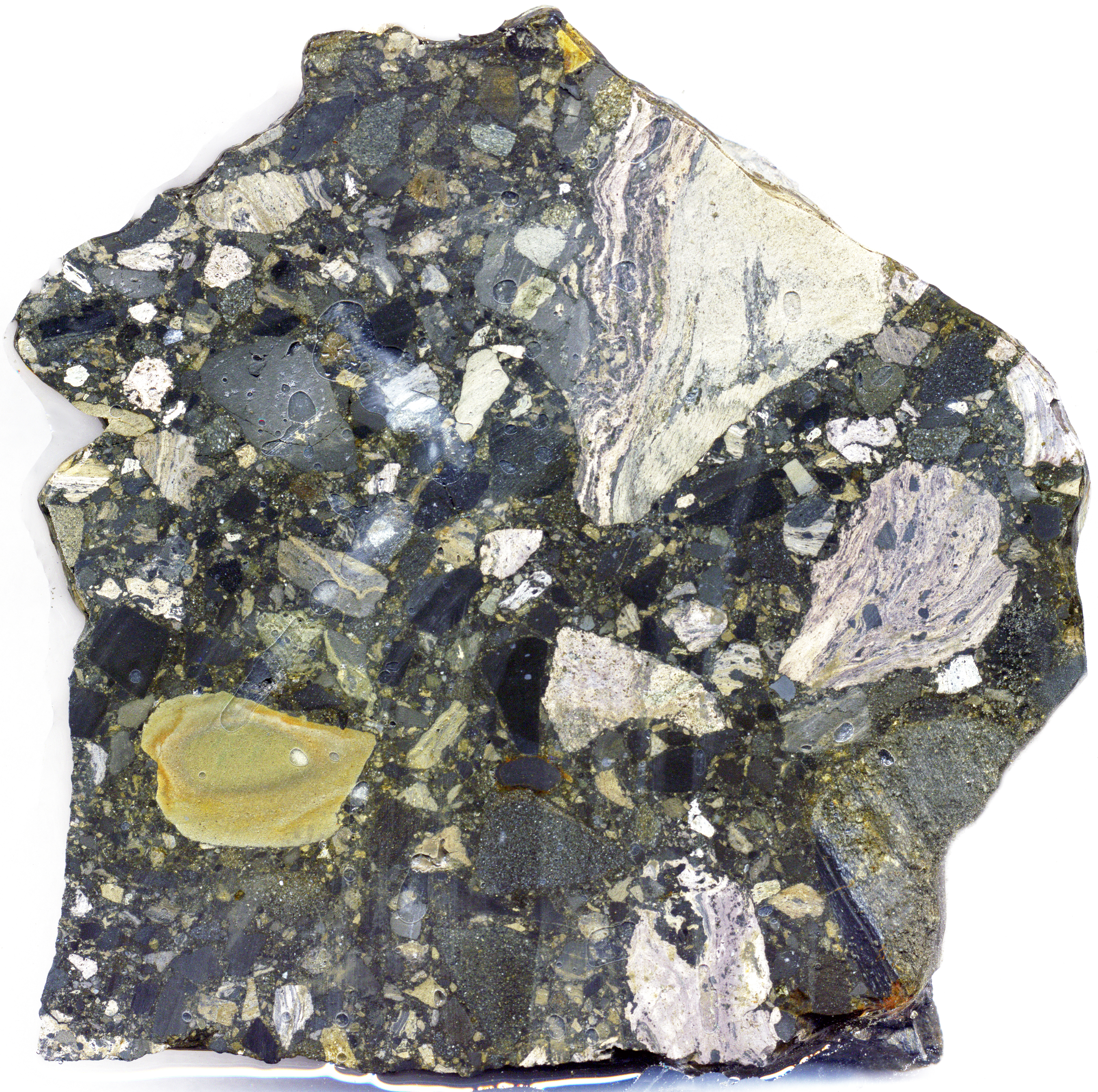
Impact breccia from the Kara impact structure in Russia

Breccia is "a rock consisting of angular fragments cemented together". An impact breccia is formed when a meteor shatters a rock and then cements it back together. Some breccias contain impact melts.

== Examples of impactite ==
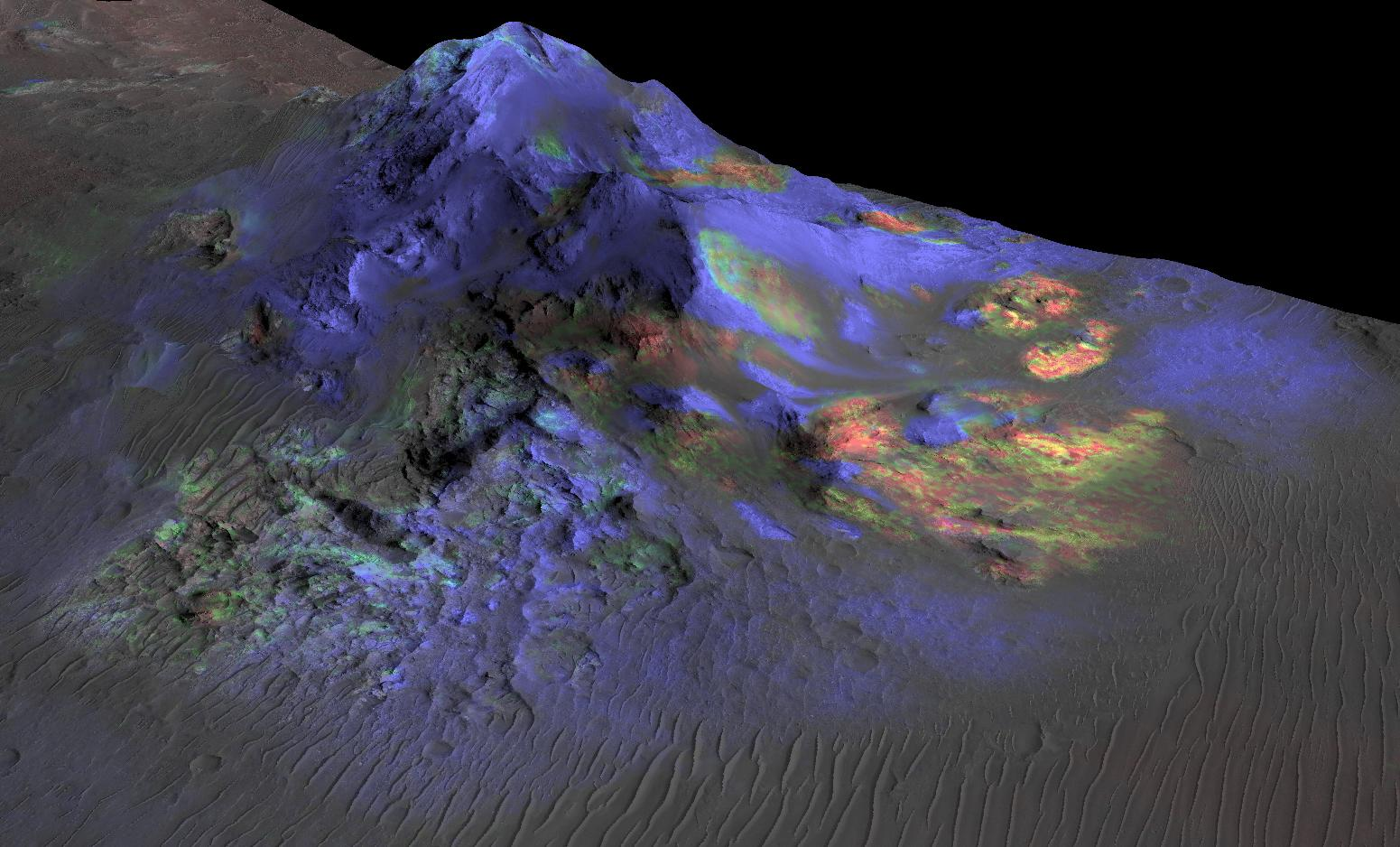
Alga crater on Mars is a possible site for preserved ancient life, after detection of an impact glass deposit.

Impactite has been found, for example, at the following impact craters and structures:

- Alamo bolide impact (Late Devonian), Nevada, United States
- Alga crater on the planet Mars
- Barringer crater, Arizona, United States
- Charlevoix impact structure, Québec, Canada
- Darwin Crater, Tasmania (source of Darwin glass)
- Lake Lappajärvi, Finland (source of Kärnäite)
- Manicouagan impact structure, Québec, Canada
- Neugrund crater, Estonia
- Nördlinger Ries crater, Germany
- Rochechouart impact structure, France
- Stac Fada Member, Scotland
- Wabar craters, Saudi Arabia

== See also ==
- Glossary of meteoritics
- Meteorite shock stage – Measure of the degree of fracturing of the matrix of a common chondrite meteorite
- Vitrified sand
