= Flynn Creek crater =

Impact crater in Tennessee

Coordinates: 36°17′N 85°40′W

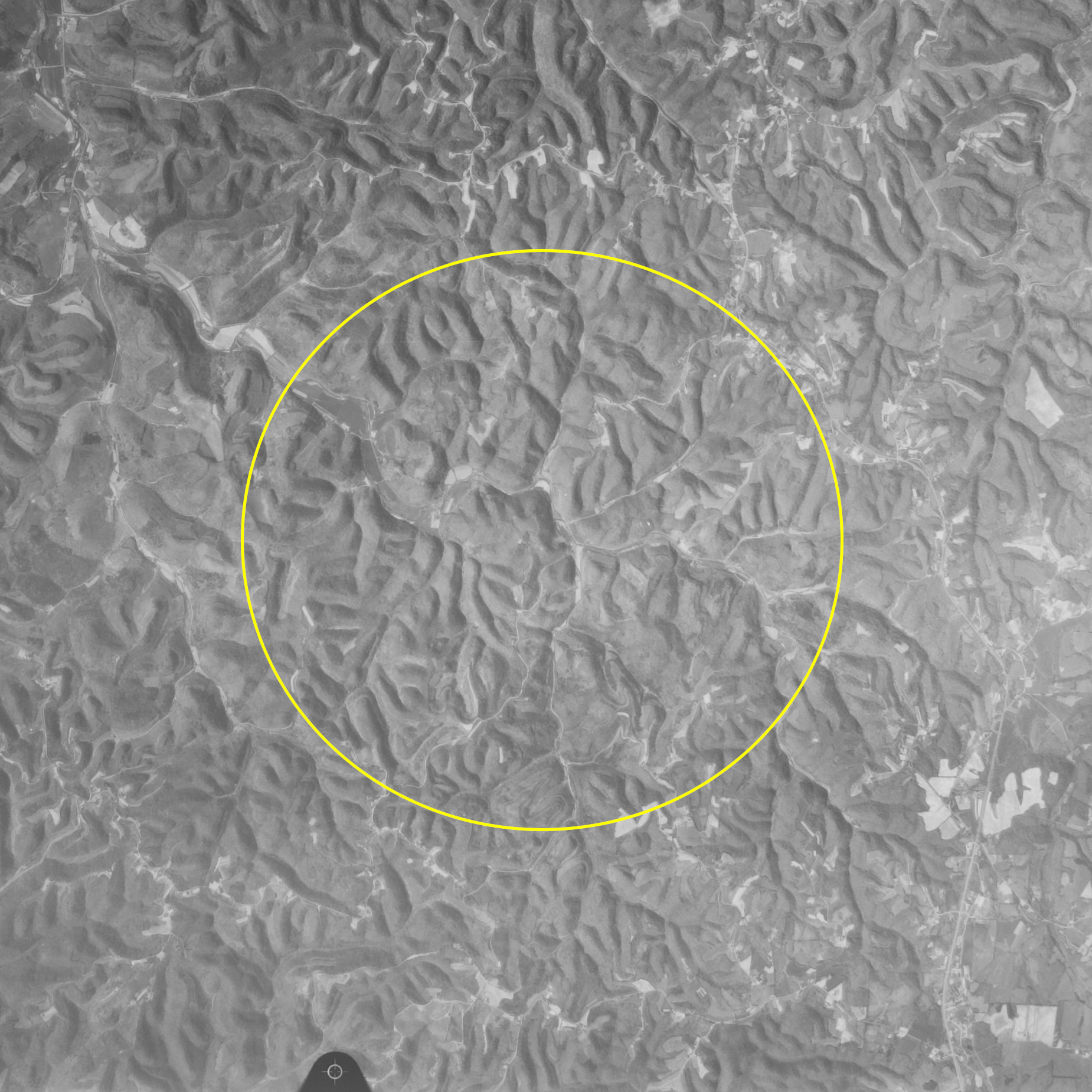
- 1975 air photo showing approximate Flynn Creek crater location

- Location within the United States Location within Tennessee

Impact crater structure
- Confidence: Confirmed
- Diameter: 3.8 kilometres (2.4 mi)
- Age: 360 ± 20 Ma
- Exposed: Yes
- Drilled: Yes

Flynn Creek crater is an impact crater situated in Jackson County, Tennessee, approximately 8 km south of Gainesboro.

== Description ==
The impact crater was formed approximately 360 million years ago as a shallow, saucer-shaped crater, 3.8 kilometres (2.4 mi) in diameter and about 150 metres (490 ft) deep. A large central hill, highly deformed rim strata, and a breccia lens 40 m (130 ft) in thickness were produced during formation. Over 2 square kilometres (490 acres) of flat lying Middle and Upper Paleozoic limestone and dolomite were brecciated and mixed to a depth of 200 m (660 ft), and at least half of the breccia was ejected from the crater. The remaining breccia contains fragments ranging in size from small grains to megabreccia blocks 100 m (330 ft) long. Undisturbed strata lie 100 metres (330 ft) below the original crater floor.

In the middle of the crater, a sequence of steeply-dipping, folded, faulted, and brecciated Middle Ordovician limestone and dolomite has been uplifted 100 m (330 ft) to form a large central hill. Rock of the Knox group in the central uplift are raised 250 m (820 ft) above their normal position and locally contain shatter cones.

In the rim surrounding the crater, Ordovician limestone has been uplifted 10–50 m (33–164 ft) and is moderately to tightly folded into doubly plunging anticlines and synclines that have axes concentric to the crater walls. In parts of the rim, folds have resulted in radial shortening as great as 35%. Faulting is common in the rim strata and is usually concentric to the crater walls.

In the southeastern rim, a large thrust block forms the crater wall and has been moved out from the crater and uplifted about 50 metres (160 ft). The thrust block partly overrides a tilted rim graben that has down-dropped about 100 m (330 ft) and moved toward the crater. Overlying this graben is a layer of breccia which is apparently the remains of an ejecta blanket that once surrounded the crater.

Post-crater erosion removed the ejecta, except for the overlying graben, and lowered the regional ground surface less than 30 metres (98 ft). Within a few million years of the cratering event the entire structure was covered with shale deposits from the Late Devonian Chattanooga Sea, creating one of the best-preserved ancient impact structures presently known. Subsequent erosion along Flynn Creek drainage has exposed a large extent of the structure. Karst development in the immediate area has created numerous caves associated with impact features, including the only cave known to occur in the central uplift of an impact structure, Hawkins Impact Cave.

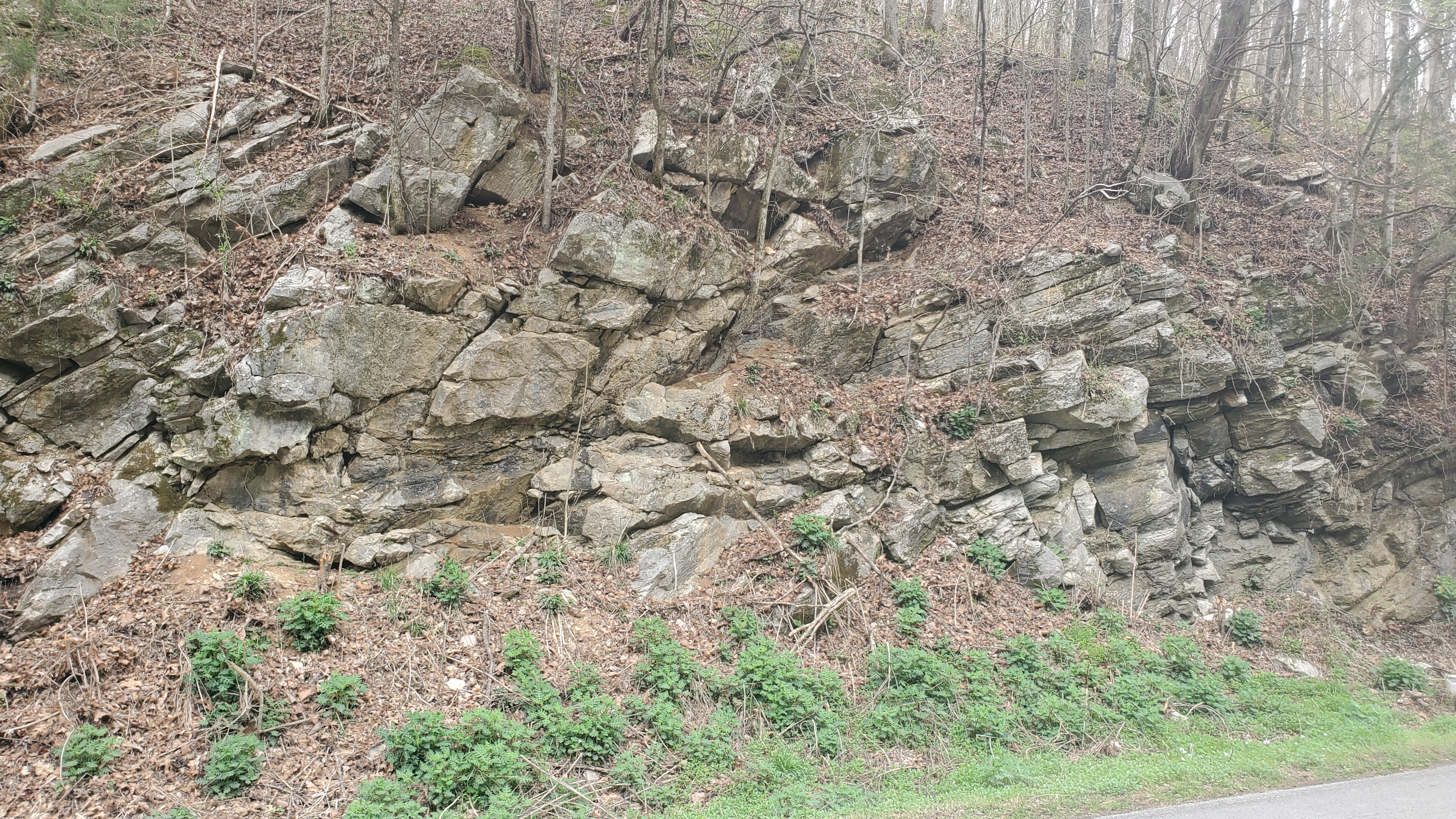
Outcrop of Stones River Group of Ordovician limestone along Flynn Creek Road, at the center of the Flynn Creek structure. The rocks dip at roughly 30 degrees unlike all other rocks 2 miles or more away which are flat-lying. Faults are also present in this photo.

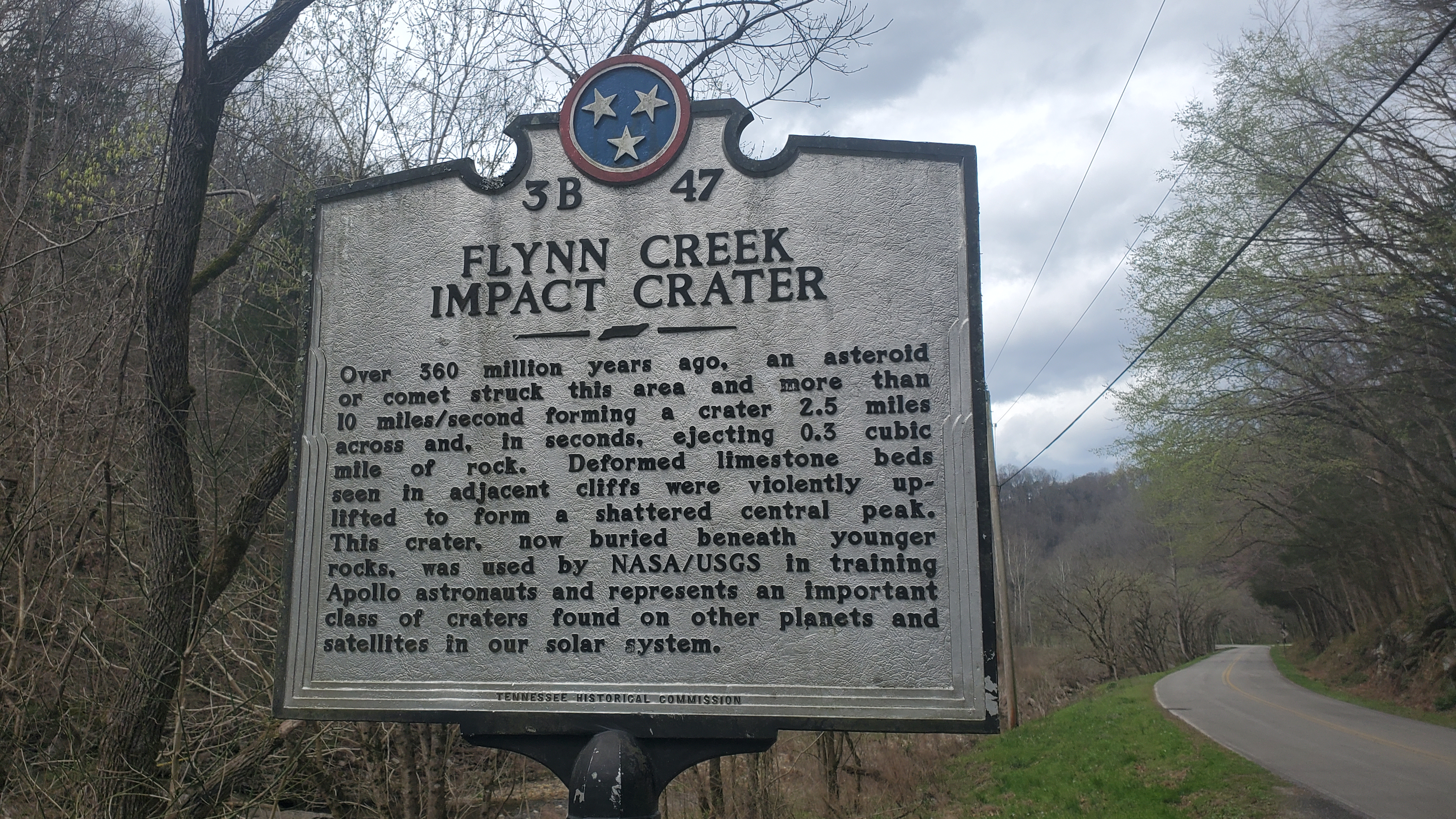
Historical marker along Flynn Creek Road at the center of the structure. It states that astronauts of the Apollo program visited the crater.

== Other facts ==
- ~20 m max pre-impact relief
- ~15 m max depth of water at time of impact
- ~40 m avg breccia thickness
- ~140 m avg breccia depth below crater floor
- ~35% max radial shortening of rim strata
- ~90-190 m range for bolide diameter
- roughly polygonal shape
- lateral zone of disturbance averages 1000 m in extent from crater wall
- lowermost size limit for complex craters with central uplifts
- 1700 m of sediments overlying crystalline basement in area
- conodonts found in immediate crater infill indicate marine environment
- central uplift is composed of strata which have been structurally uplifted 300 m above normal position
- 11.2–72 km/s velocity range for terrestrial impacting bodies
- 25 km/s total vaporization of stony bolides
