= Shock metamorphism =

Shock-wave related deformation and heating of rocks during collisions

Shock metamorphism or impact metamorphism describes the effects of shock-wave related deformation and heating during impact events.

The formation of similar features during explosive volcanism is generally discounted due to the lack of metamorphic effects unequivocally associated with explosions and the difficulty in reaching sufficient pressures during such an event.

== Effects ==
=== Mineral microstructures ===
==== Planar fractures ====
Planar fractures are parallel sets of multiple planar cracks or cleavages in quartz grains; they develop at the lowest pressures characteristic of shock waves (~5–8 GPa) and a common feature of quartz grains found associated with impact structures. Although the occurrence of planar fractures is relatively common in other deformed rocks, the development of intense, widespread, and closely spaced planar fractures is considered diagnostic of shock metamorphism.

==== Planar deformation features ====
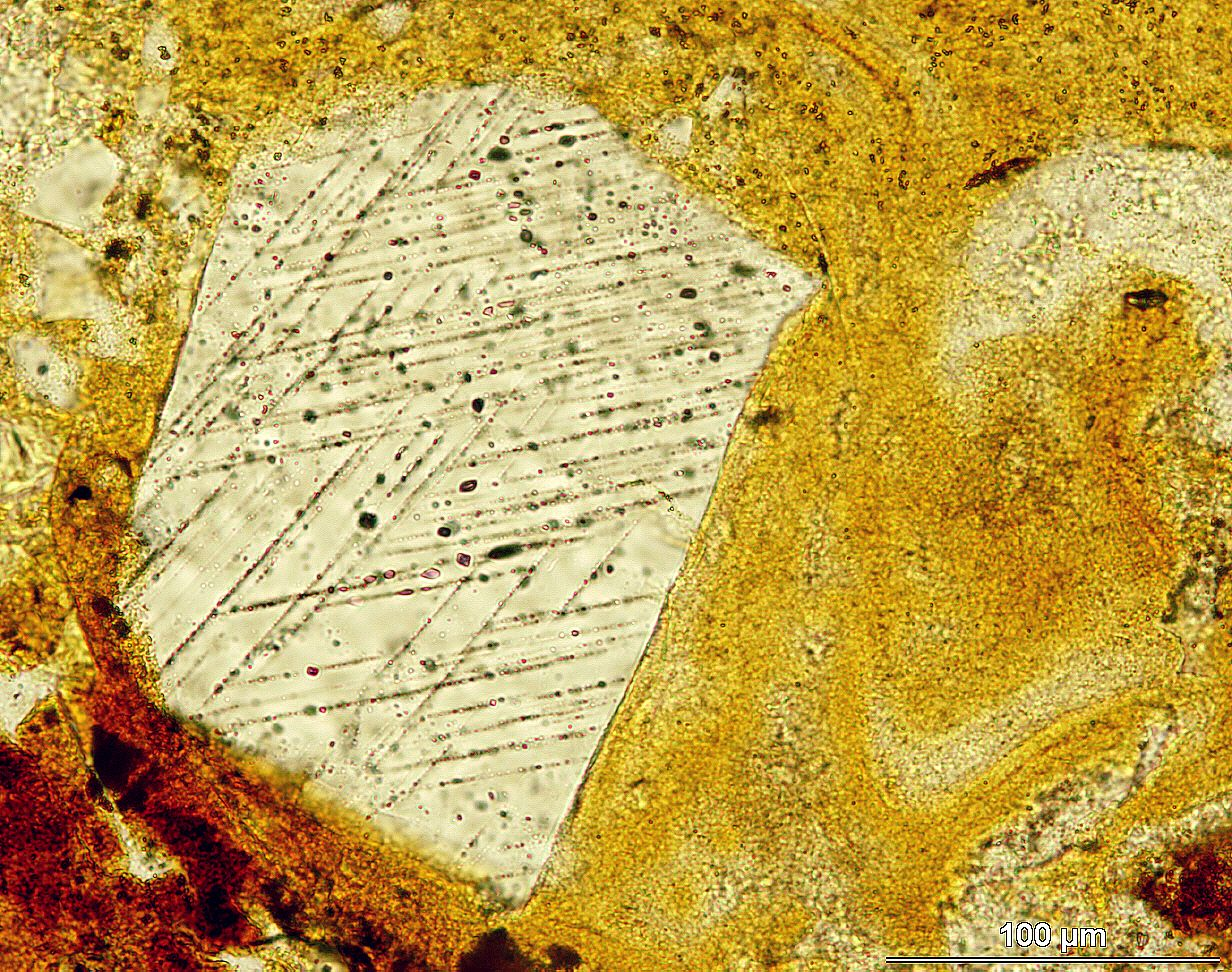
Shocked quartz with two sets of ‘decorated’ planar deformation features in impact melt rock from the Suvasvesi South impact structure, Finland (thin section photomicrograph, plane polarized light).

Planar deformation features, or PDFs, are optically recognizable microscopic features in grains of silicate minerals (usually quartz or feldspar), consisting of very narrow planes of glassy material arranged in parallel sets that have distinct orientations with respect to the grain's crystal structure. PDFs are only produced by extreme shock compressions on the scale of meteor impacts. They are not found in volcanic environments.

==== Brazil twinning in quartz ====
This form of twinning in quartz is relatively common but the occurrence of close-spaced Brazil twins parallel to the basal plane, (0001), has only been reported from impact structures. Experimental formation of basal-orientated Brazil twins in quartz requires high stresses (about 8 GPa) and high strain rates, and it seems probable that such features in natural quartz can also be regarded as unique impact indicators.

=== High-pressure polymorphs ===
The very high pressures associated with impacts can lead to the formation of high-pressure polymorphs of various minerals. Quartz may occur as either of its two high-pressure forms, coesite and stishovite. Coesite occasionally occurs associated with eclogites formed during very high pressure regional metamorphism but was first discovered in a meteorite crater in 1960. Stishovite, however, is only known from impact structures.

Reidite, the high-pressure scheelite-structure polymorph of zircon, is known only from impact structures.

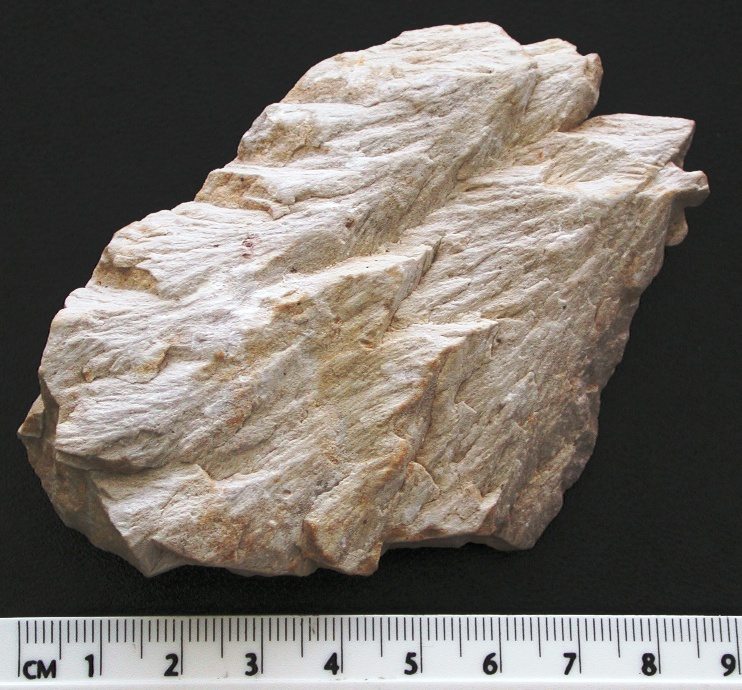
Shatter cones developed in fine grained dolomite from the Wells Creek crater, USA.

Two of the high-pressure polymorphs of titanium dioxide, one with a baddeleyite-like form and the other with a α-PbO_{2} structure, have been found associated with the Nördlinger Ries impact structure.

Diamond, the high-pressure allotrope of carbon, has been found associated with many impact structures, and both fullerenes and carbynes have been reported.

=== Shatter cones ===
Shatter cones have a distinctively conical shape that radiates from the top of the cones repeating cone-on-cone, at various scales in the same sample. They are only known to form in rocks beneath meteorite impact craters or underground nuclear explosions. They are evidence that the rock has been subjected to a shock with pressures in the range of 2-30 GPa.

== Occurrence ==
The effects described above have been found singly, or more often in combination, associated with every impact structure that has been identified on Earth. The search for such effects therefore forms the basis for identifying possible candidate impact structures, particularly to distinguish them from volcanic features.

== See also ==
- Impactite
- Meteorite shock stage
- Suevite
