= Slavče =

- Municipality
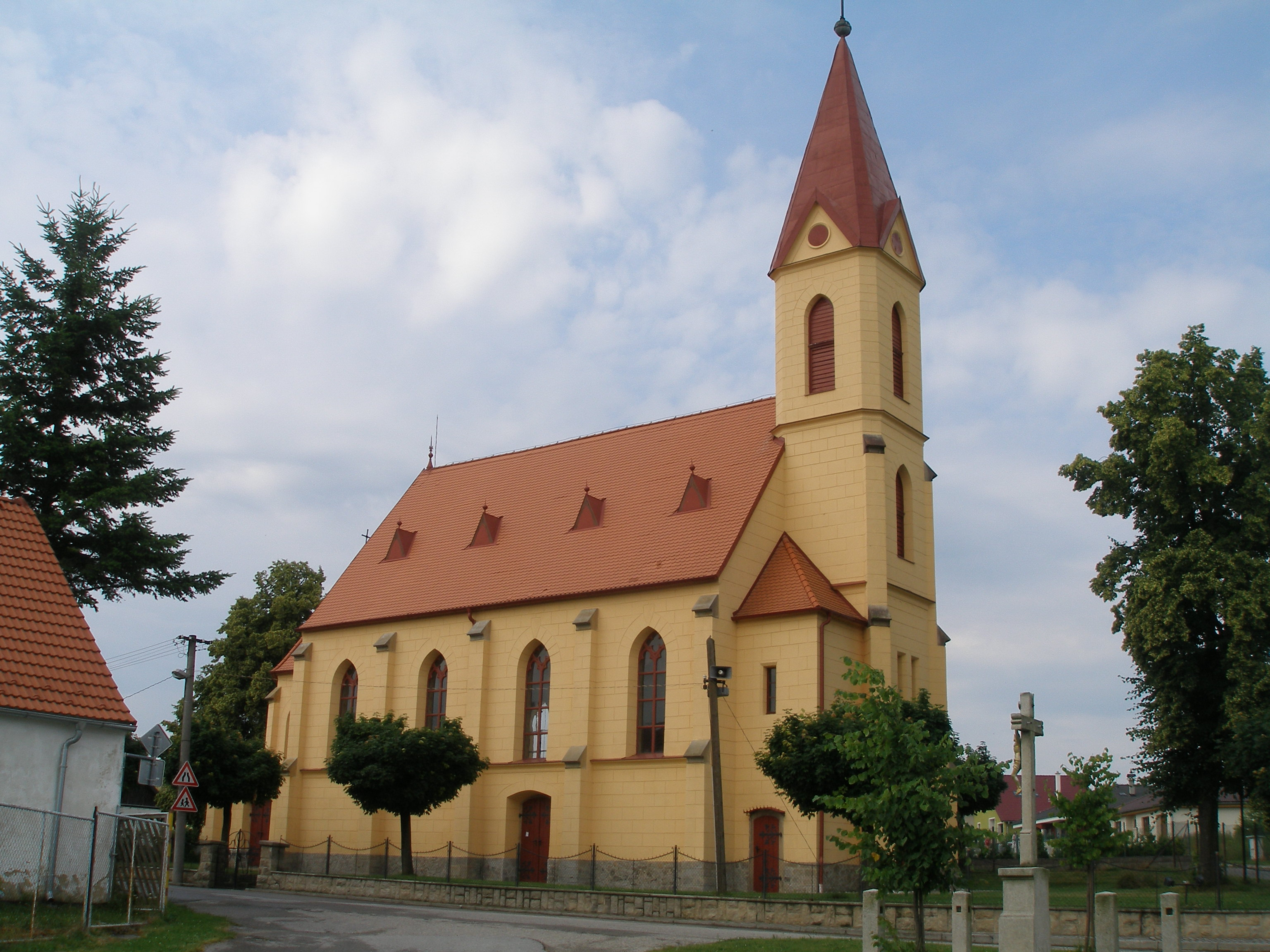
- Church of Saints Philip and James

- Location in the Czech Republic
- Coordinates: 48°47′53″N 14°36′54″E
- Country: Czech Republic
- Region: South Bohemian
- District: České Budějovice
- First mentioned: 1394

Area
  - Total: 16.27 km^{2} (6.28 sq mi)
- Elevation: 568 m (1,864 ft)

Population (2026-01-01)
  - Total: 753
  - Density: 46.3/km^{2} (120/sq mi)
- Time zone: UTC+1 (CET)
  - Summer (DST): UTC+2 (CEST)
- Postal code: 373 21
- Website: www.slavce.cz

Slavče is a municipality and village in České Budějovice District in the South Bohemian Region of the Czech Republic. It has about 800 inhabitants.

Slavče lies approximately 23 kilometres (14 mi) south-east of České Budějovice and 144 km (89 mi) south of Prague.

== Administrative division ==
Slavče consists of six municipal parts (in brackets population according to the 2021 census):

- Slavče (383)
- Dobrkovská Lhotka (125)
- Keblany (56)
- Lniště (27)
- Mohuřice (83)
- Záluží (11)

== Demographics ==
Historical population
Year	Pop.	±%
1869	1,056	—
1880	1,212	+14.8%
1890	1,253	+3.4%
1900	1,239	−1.1%
1910	1,329	+7.3%
1921	1,291	−2.9%
1930	1,169	−9.5%
1950	751	−35.8%
1961	702	−6.5%
1970	620	−11.7%
1980	524	−15.5%
1991	497	−5.2%
2001	515	+3.6%
2011	581	+12.8%
2021	685	+17.9%
Source: Censuses
