= Vrábče =

- Municipality
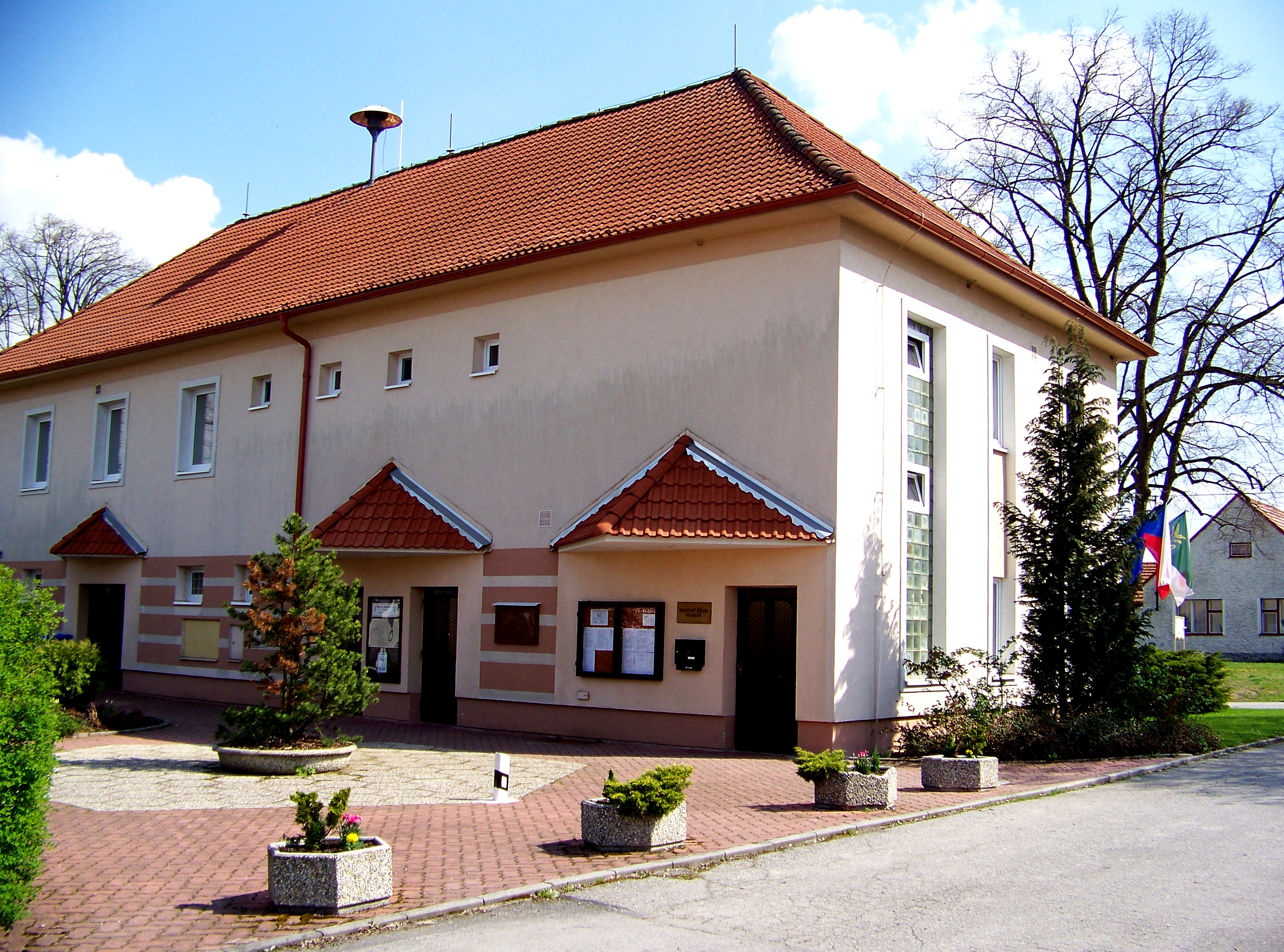
- Municipal office

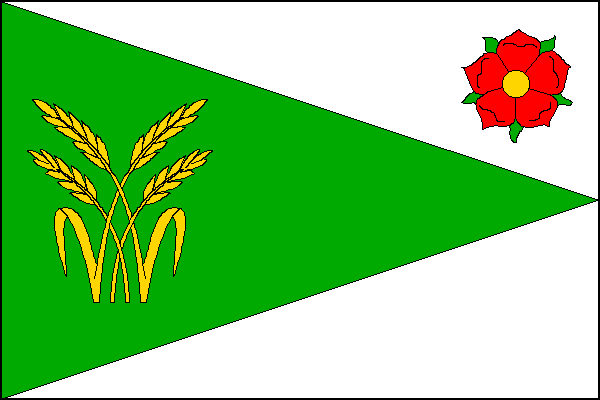
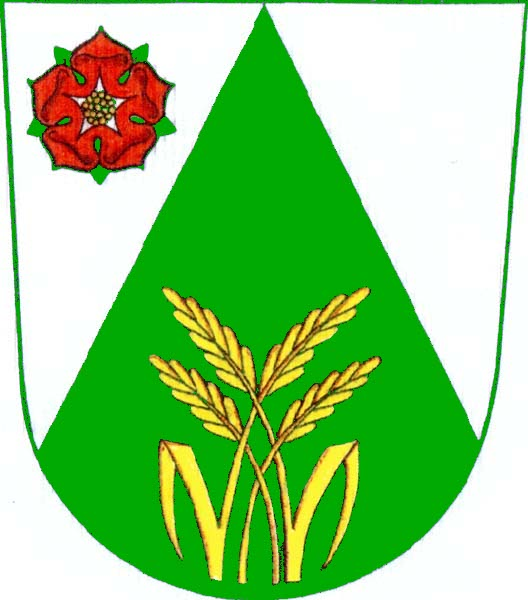
- Flag Coat of arms

- Location in the Czech Republic
- Coordinates: 48°55′3″N 14°22′33″E
- Country: Czech Republic
- Region: South Bohemian
- District: České Budějovice
- First mentioned: 1379

Area
  - Total: 15.73 km^{2} (6.07 sq mi)
- Elevation: 505 m (1,657 ft)

Population (2026-01-01)
  - Total: 887
  - Density: 56.4/km^{2} (146/sq mi)
- Time zone: UTC+1 (CET)
  - Summer (DST): UTC+2 (CEST)
- Postal code: 370 01
- Website: www.vrabce.cz

Vrábče (German: Prabsch) is a municipality and village in České Budějovice District in the South Bohemian Region of the Czech Republic. It has about 900 inhabitants.

Vrábče lies approximately 10 kilometres (6 mi) south-west of České Budějovice and 130 km (81 mi) south of Prague.

== Administrative division ==
Vrábče consists of four municipal parts (in brackets population according to the 2021 census):

- Vrábče (647)
- Koroseky (52)
- Kroclov (50)
- Slavče (116)

== Demographics ==
Historical population
Year	Pop.	±%
1869	730	—
1880	760	+4.1%
1890	796	+4.7%
1900	767	−3.6%
1910	785	+2.3%
1921	803	+2.3%
1930	815	+1.5%
1950	702	−13.9%
1961	646	−8.0%
1970	532	−17.6%
1980	456	−14.3%
1991	423	−7.2%
2001	449	+6.1%
2011	666	+48.3%
2021	865	+29.9%
Source: Censuses
