= Nördlinger Ries =

Meteorite impact crater in Bavaria, Germany

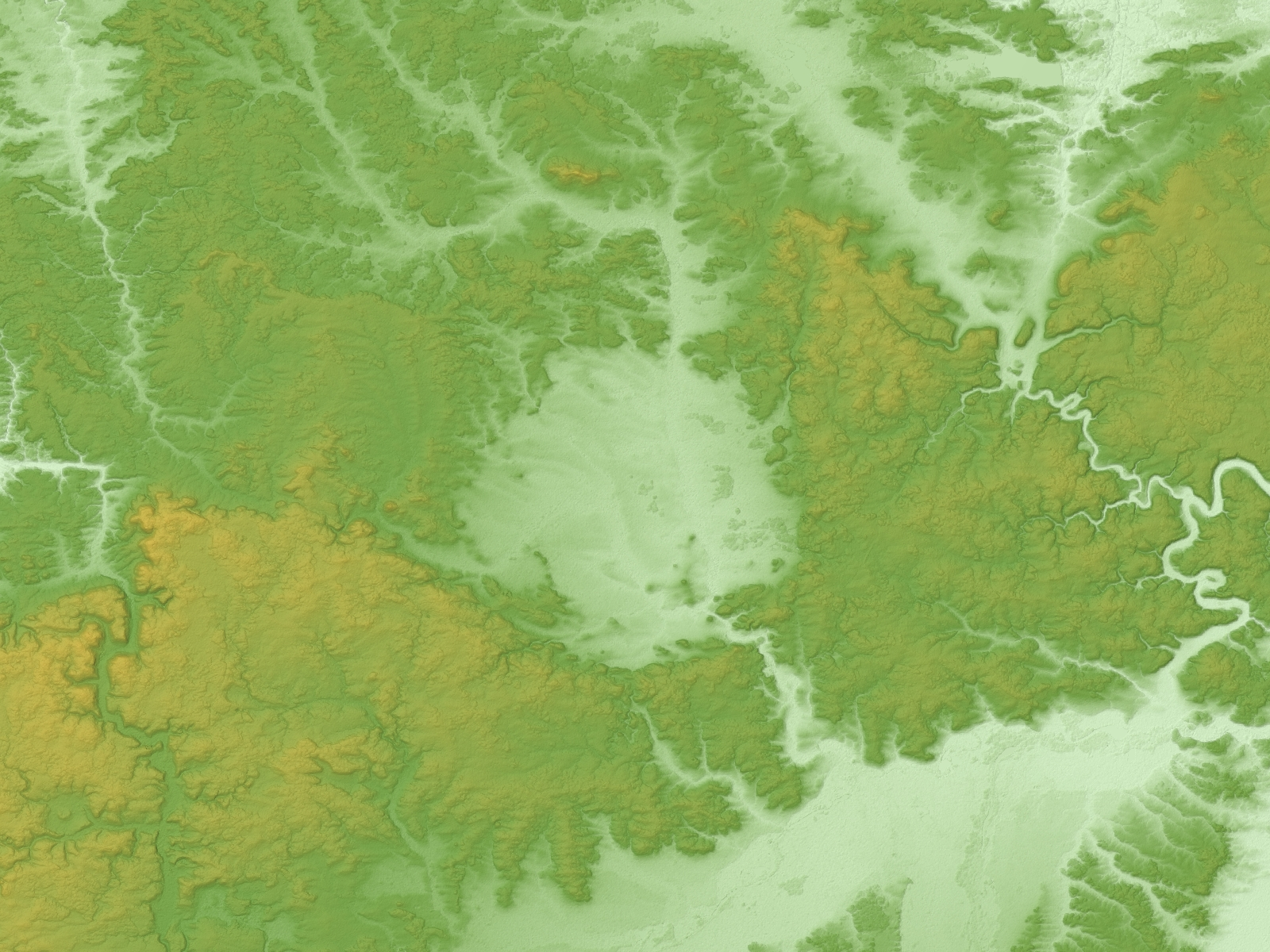
- Relief map of Nördlinger Ries

- Location within Germany
- Location: Nördlingen, Donau-Ries, Bavaria and Baden-Württemberg, Germany; 48°53′N 10°34′E

Impact crater structure
- Confidence: Confirmed
- Diameter: 24 km (15 mi)
- Age: 14.808 ± 0.038 Ma, Middle Miocene
- Exposed: Yes
- Drilled: Yes
- Bolide type: Achondrite

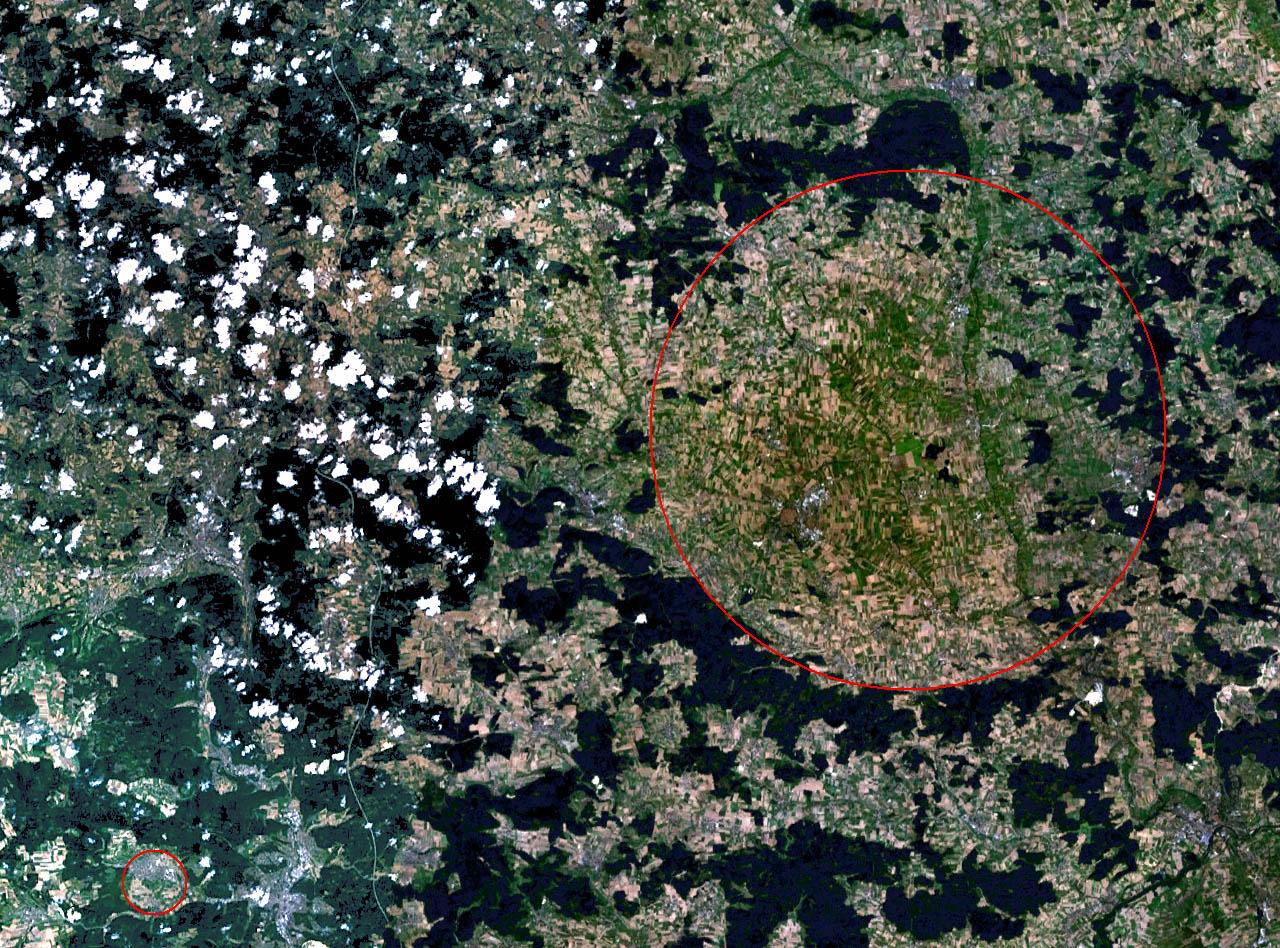
Satellite image of the Nördlinger Ries (large circular structure on the right) and the Steinheim Basin (lower left)

The Nördlinger Ries (German pronunciation: [ˈnœʁtlɪŋɐ ˈʁiːs]) is an impact crater and large circular depression in western Bavaria and eastern Baden-Württemberg. It is located north of the Danube in the district of Donau-Ries. The city of Nördlingen is located within the depression, about 6 kilometres (3.7 mi) south-west of its centre.

== Etymology ==
Ries is derived from Raetia, since the tribe of Raetians lived in the area in pre-Roman times.

== Description ==
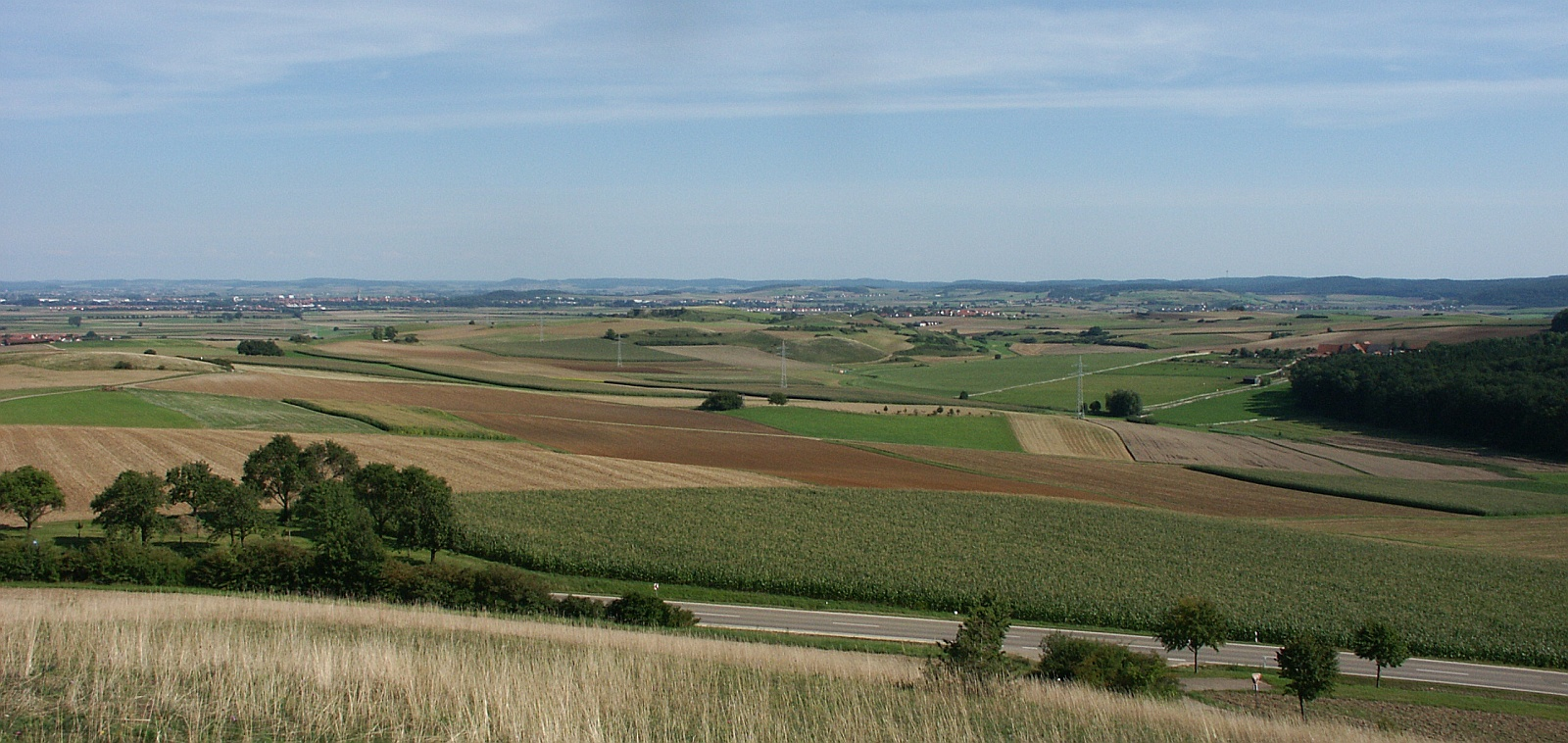
View of Nördlinger Ries

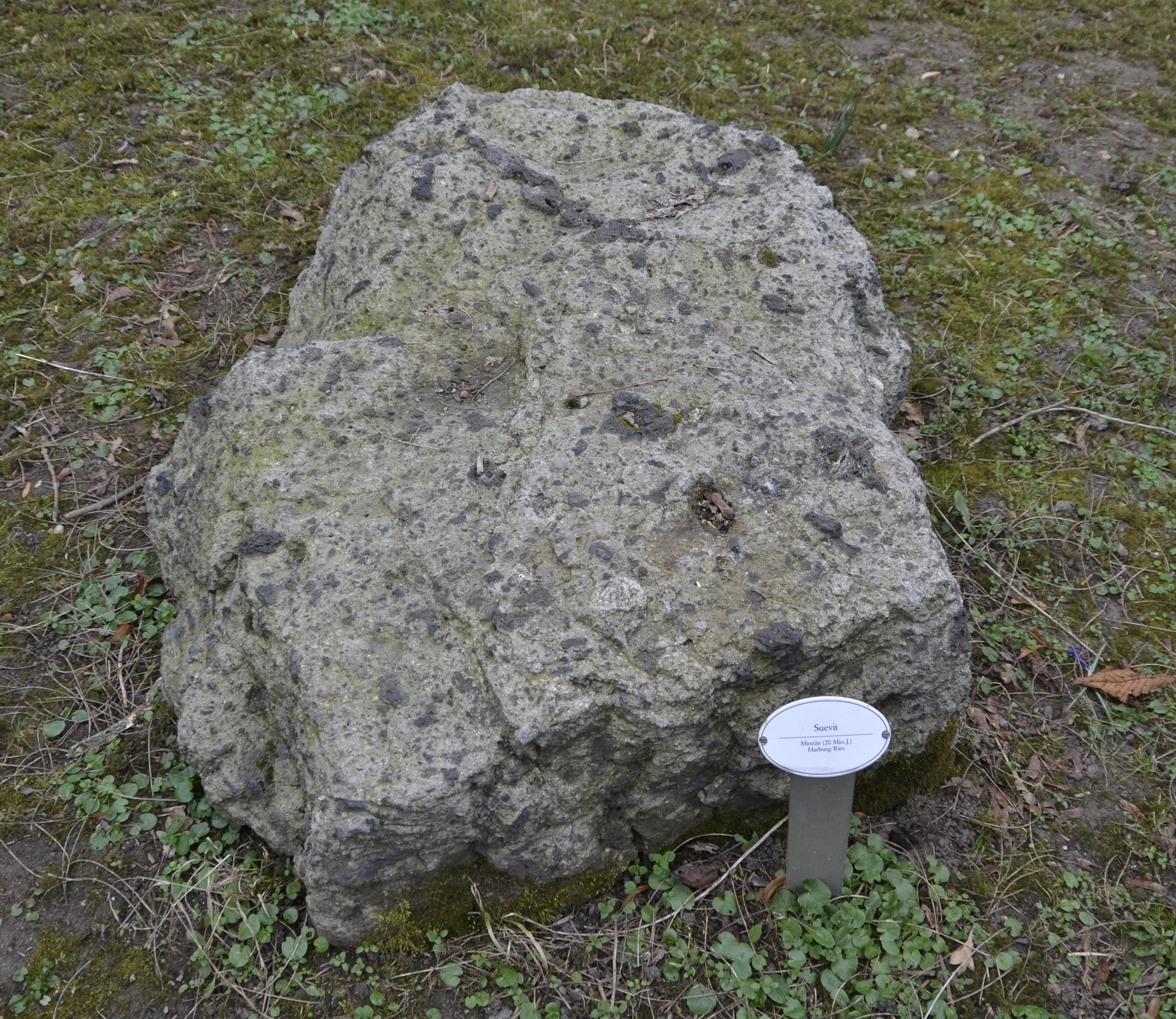
Suevite from Nördlinger Ries

The depression is a meteorite impact crater formed 14.808 ± 0.038 million years ago in the Miocene. The crater is most commonly referred to simply as the Ries crater or the Ries. The original crater rim had an estimated diameter of 24 km (15 mi). The present floor of the depression is about 100 to 150 m (330 to 490 ft) below the eroded remains of the rim.

It was originally assumed that the Ries was of volcanic, glacial or tectonic origin. Oliver Sachs introduced, in this context, the term "pioneer era" (up to 1870) and marked the beginning of early modern research on the Ries (from 1870), meaning the period when the first detailed theories about the formation of the Nördlinger Ries became known. In 1960 Eugene Shoemaker and Edward C. T. Chao showed that the depression was caused by meteorite impact. The key evidence was the presence of coesite, which, in unmetamorphosed rocks, can only be formed by the shock pressures associated with meteorite impact. The coesite was found in suevite from Otting quarry, but even before, Shoemaker was encouraged by St. George's Church in Nördlingen, which is built of locally derived suevite. The suevite was formed from mesozoic sediments shocked by the bolide impact.

The Ries impact crater was a rampart crater, thus far a unique finding on Earth. Rampart craters have almost exclusively been found on Mars. Rampart craters exhibit a fluidized ejecta flow after the impact of the meteorite, most simply compared to a bullet fired into the mud, with the ejecta resembling a mudflow.

Another impact crater, the much smaller (3.8 km (2.4 mi) diameter) Steinheim crater, is located about 42 km (26 mi) west-southwest from the center of Ries. It had previously been thought that the two craters formed simultaneously by the impact of a binary asteroid 14.8 million years ago, but a study published in 2020 suggests that Steinheim could actually be about 500,000 years younger than Nördlinger Ries.

Recent computer modeling of the impact event indicates that the impactors probably had diameters of about 1.5 km (4,900 ft) (Ries) and 150 m (490 ft) (Steinheim), had a pre-impact separation of some tens of kilometers, and impacted the target area at an angle around 30 to 50 degrees from the surface in a west-southwest to east-northeast direction. The impact velocity is thought to have been about 20 km/s (72,000 km/h; 45,000 mph). The resulting explosion had the power of 40 million Hiroshima bombs, an energy of roughly 2.4×10^{21} joules.

The Ries crater impact event is believed to be the source of moldavite tektites found in southern Bohemia and Moravia (Czech Republic). The tektite melt originated from a sand-rich surface layer that was ejected to distances up to 450 km (280 mi) downrange of the crater. The shape of the strewnfield suggests that the direction of impact was from the west-southwest.

Stone buildings in Nördlingen contain millions of tiny diamonds, all less than 0.2 mm (0.008 in) across. The impact that caused the Nördlinger Ries crater created an estimated 72,000 tonnes (72,000,000 kg) of them when it impacted a local graphite deposit. Stone from this area was quarried and used to build the local buildings.

=== Present state ===
After the impact, the crater filled with water, forming a lake ~400 km^{2} in area, almost the size of Lake Constance. The lake silted up after about two million years. The present Ries basin was only exposed by erosion during the Ice Ages.

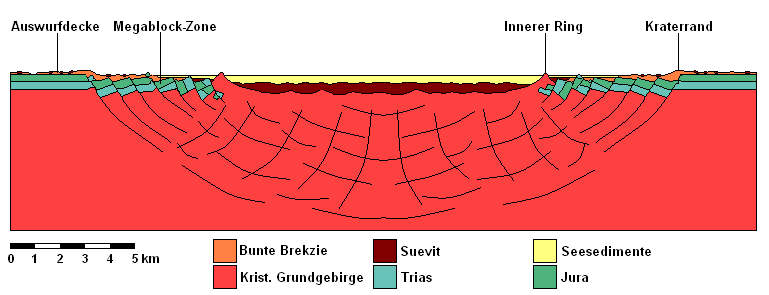

== Impact ==
The Ries impact (also known as the Ries event) was an asteroid impact that occurred approximately 15 million years ago in what is now southern Germany. The resulting impact crater, the Nördlinger Ries, has a diameter of about 24 km (15 mi), indicating the release of an enormous amount of energy. The nearby Steinheim Basin and a number of smaller craters on the Franconian Jura and in the Lake Constance area are, according to more recent findings, not contemporaneous with the Nördlinger Ries and are therefore not part of the Ries event.

=== Sequence ===
The Nördlinger Ries is one of the best-studied impact craters on Earth. Since 1960, when it was proven that the formation of the Ries crater resulted from the impact of an asteroid, scientists have developed a highly detailed understanding of the events that took place during its formation 14.6 ± 0.2 million years ago (during the Miocene Langhian stage). A recent geophysical study was able to demonstrate, based on the different impact rocks, that the Ries impactor struck from the north-northwest.

=== Asteroid ===
In just a few seconds, a celestial body — an asteroid approximately 1.5 km (0.93 mi) in diameter — travelling at 20 km/s (72,000 km/h or 45,000 mph) passed through the Earth's atmosphere. As a meteor whose apparent magnitude exceeded that of the Sun, it approached the Earth's surface almost undamped from a westerly direction. The much smaller Steinheim Basin, located about 40 km (25 mi) southwest and formed by a second body, is now known to be several hundred thousand years younger and thus not contemporaneous.

Fractions of a second before the asteroid hit the surface at an angle of about 30°, the air between the asteroid and the ground was compressed and heated. Surface soil, sand, and gravel instantly vaporised and, together with the compressed air, were forced sideways from beneath the asteroid in a process known as jetting. Molten surface material was ejected at high velocity up to 450 km (280 mi) away. The melted sands came to rest in a confined area in what is now Bohemia and Moravia, where these solidified melt droplets, known as moldavites, are still found today.

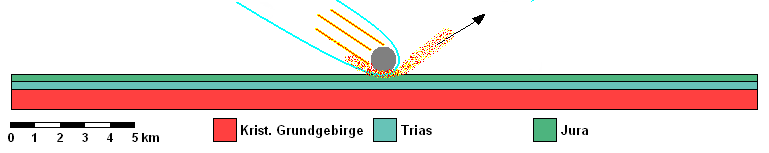

=== Compression ===
The impactor penetrated the Mesozoic sedimentary cover and reached a depth of about one kilometre into the crystalline basement. The total penetration depth is estimated at approximately 4 km. Both the asteroid and the surrounding rock were compressed to less than half their original volume. At pressures of several million bar (500 GPa) and temperatures up to 30,000 °C, the asteroid and the surrounding rock vaporised almost instantly, within fractions of a second after contact.

The shock wave propagated through the rock around the impact site at supersonic speed. With increasing distance, the stress on the rocks from pressure and temperature decreased; the rocks were only partially melted or transformed under high pressure and high temperature. Through the process known as shock-wave metamorphism, quartz was converted into coesite or stishovite, and diaplectic glasses also formed. For kilometres around the impact point, the rock was deformed and liquefied under the extreme pressure.

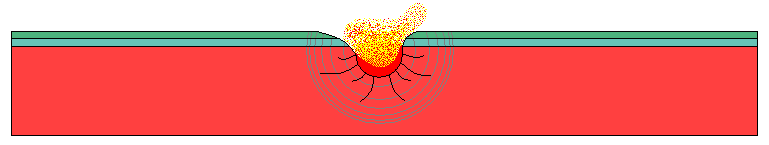

=== Ejection ===
Approximately two seconds after impact, the main excavation phase began: once the shock wave had passed, the rock rebounded, the new crater floor rose, and a central uplift formed in the centre. Debris from inside the crater was ejected in the form of a conical curtain (ejecta curtain) along ballistic trajectories, while in the crater rim zone larger blocks were pushed across the surface (roll-glide mechanism). During ejection, rocks from a wide variety of stratigraphic levels were mixed together and formed a continuous ejecta blanket extending up to 40 km from the crater, initially reaching thicknesses of up to 100 metres. Today, these ejecta deposits surrounding the Ries crater are known as the Bunte Breccia (colourful breccia).

The explosion, whose energy was equivalent to several hundred thousand Hiroshima bombs, excavated a transient crater approximately 8 km in diameter and 4 km deep. The fireball rose from the crater, carrying with it pulverised and partially molten rock.

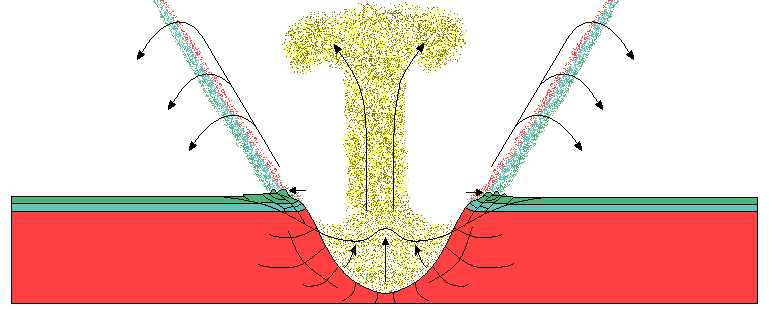

=== Crater growth ===
The primary crater was unstable: along its steep walls, kilometre-sized rock slabs slid toward the centre, enlarging the crater to approximately 24 km in diameter. The central uplift also collapsed. Material farther out was pushed upward, forming the prominent inner ring still visible today. Exposed at the surface in this ring are magmatic basement rocks that, in undisturbed sections, lie 300–400 m deeper.

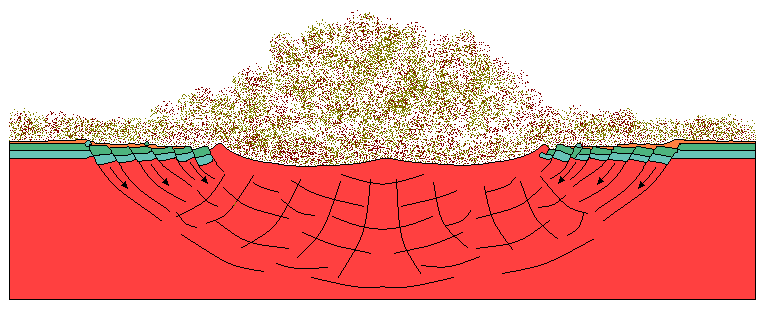

After about three minutes, crater growth ceased. Minutes later, the glowing cloud above the crater collapsed: hot pulverised rock and solidified melt fell back, filling the ~500 m deep crater to a depth of ~400 m. The surrounding ejecta blanket was also covered by hot ash rain. The solidified material from the cloud forms the suevite typical of the Ries crater. The thick suevite layer inside the crater is estimated to have taken about 2,000 years to cool from 600 °C to 100 °C.

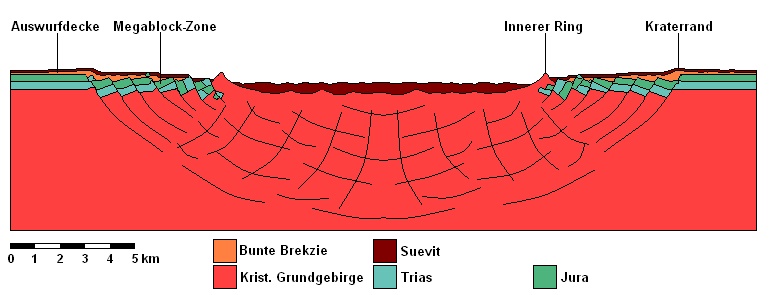

=== Effects ===
In total, the impactor and 3 km^{3} of terrestrial rock vaporised, ~150 km^{3} of rock were ejected, and ~1,000 km^{3} were displaced. The impact triggered an earthquake estimated at magnitude 8 on the moment magnitude scale. An area of about 5,000 km^{2} around the crater was buried metres deep under ejecta.

About 10 km east of the crater rim, the ancestral Main and Altmühl rivers flowed southward. Their courses were blocked by ejecta, damming a lake in the northeast of the crater that reached up to 500 km^{2} and extended north nearly to present-day Nuremberg.

Even 100 km away, the rising fireball appeared ~30 times larger and 70 times brighter than the Sun. Its thermal radiation could scorch fur, feathers, and skin and ignite grass and leaves. About five minutes after impact, the atmospheric shock wave arrived with winds up to 600 km/h and overpressures up to 100 kPa (1 bar).

At 200 km distance, the fireball appeared ~10 times larger and brighter than the Sun. The pressure wave, arriving after ~10 minutes, felled about one-third of trees with winds up to 200 km/h. Approximately 300 km southeast near present-day Liezen, a possible impact-triggered landslide (today the Pyhrn Pass) diverted the ancestral Enns southward into the Graz Basin.

Even at 500 km, the earthquake was clearly felt (intensity 4–5 on the Mercalli intensity scale). The pressure wave arrived after ~30 minutes with winds still reaching ~50 km/h (Beaufort scale 6).

Travelling at the speed of sound, the pressure wave circled the globe: at the antipode (~20,000 km away), it arrived after ~17 hours with a sound intensity of ~40 decibels — the impact was effectively audible worldwide.

=== Energy and size of the impactor ===
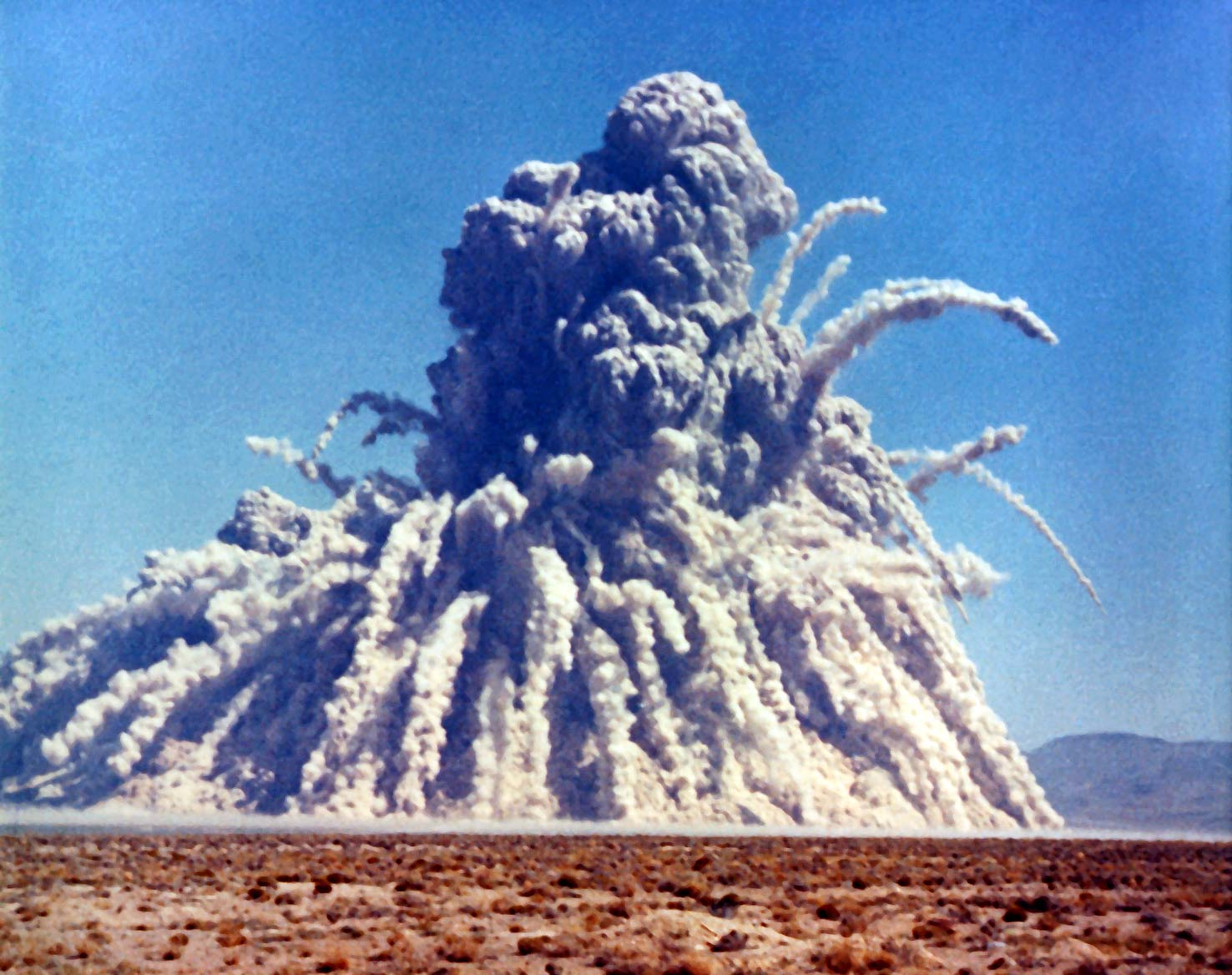
The 1962 nuclear test Storax Sedan for comparison

From the size of an impact crater, the measurement of the gravity anomaly in the crater, the distribution of the ejected material and the destruction in the surrounding rocks, the energy necessary for the formation of the crater can be estimated. For the Ries crater, the energy released during the impact is estimated at 10^{19} to 10^{20} joules. The upper value corresponds to approximately 1,850 times the energy of the eruption of Mount St. Helens in 1980 (5.4 × 10^{16} joules) or 90 times the energy released during the 2004 Indian Ocean earthquake (1.1 × 10^{18} joules). According to calculations from 2005, the energy could even have amounted to 10^{21} joules if one assumes a roughly spherical stony meteorite with a diameter of 1,500 m and an impact velocity of 20 km/s.

As a further comparison, the civil nuclear test Storax Sedan may serve, which was carried out in 1962 as a test for the peaceful use of nuclear weapons for earth-moving work. The explosion left behind an explosion crater 390 m in diameter and 97 m deep. In the Ries event, roughly 200,000 times as much energy was converted as in this test with a yield of 104 kilotons of TNT (≈ 4.5 × 10^{14} joules).

Since no meteoritic traces of the impactor could be detected in the rocks of the borehole Nördlingen 1973 from the Ries crater, no statements could be derived as to which type of asteroid it was. Therefore, no conclusions can be drawn about the size of the cosmic body from this study. However, iridium, rhodium and ruthenium abundance ratios from suevite of the Enkingen research drilling suggest that the Ries impactor was not a chondrite. The evaluation of the Ir-enriched suevite samples from the 2006 Enkingen drill core excludes a chondritic nature of the Ries projectile with high confidence based on highly correlated platinum group elements and diagnostic subchondritic Ir/Rh and Ru/Rh element ratios. By measuring the Ru isotope abundances (nucleosynthetic Ru isotope signature) of the suevite, it is possible to obtain further clues about the projectile of the Ries crater. Modelling calculations suggest that a stony meteorite of about 1.5 km diameter, coming from the southwest, probably struck at an angle of 30° to 50° to the horizontal with a velocity of 20 km/s. Simulations with these parameters were able to reproduce the distribution of the moldavites ejected during the impact quite accurately.

== Related craters ==
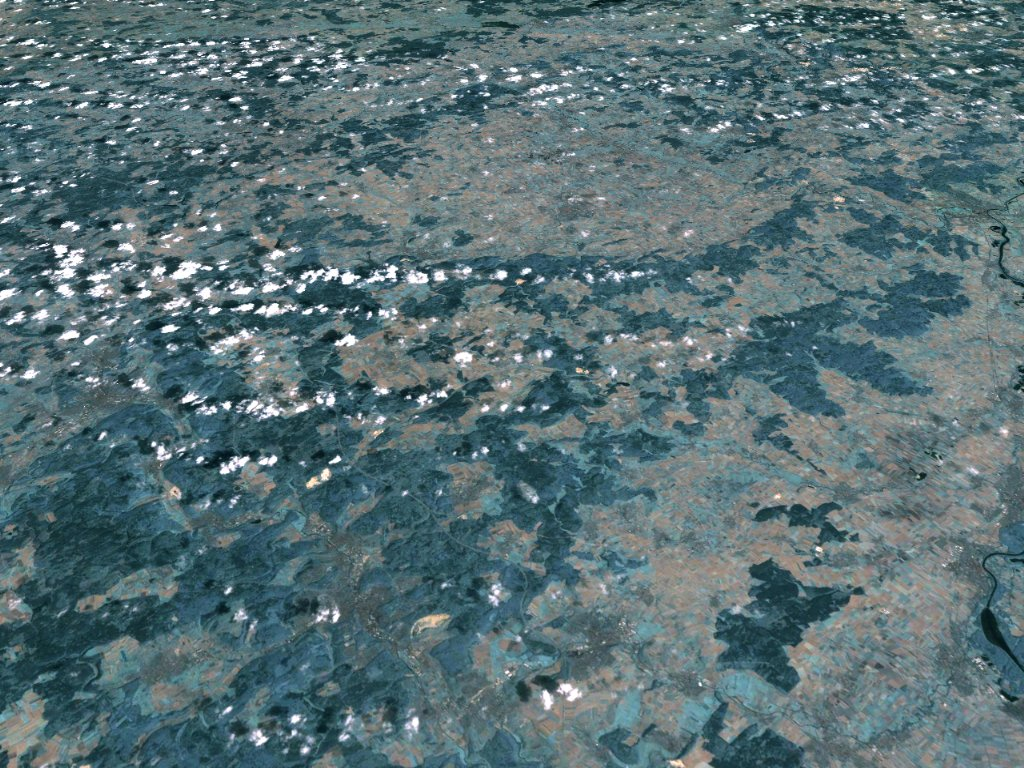
Steinheim Basin (foreground left) and Nördlinger Ries (background)

=== Steinheim crater ===
Approximately 40 km (25 mi) southwest of the Nördlinger Ries lies the Steinheim Basin (48°41′12″N 10°3′54″E), another impact crater that is also roughly 15 million years old. The older view held that it formed simultaneously with the Ries crater. The idea that the two neighbouring craters originated independently but at approximately the same time was long regarded as unlikely. According to the earlier hypothesis, the cosmic bodies responsible for the two craters consisted of one asteroid accompanied by a much smaller companion, whose separation already before entering the Earth's atmosphere roughly corresponded to the present-day distance between the Ries and the Steinheim Basin.

Contrary to this scenario, more recent studies based on various stratigraphic and palaeontological analyses suggest that the Steinheim Basin formed approximately 500,000 years after the Ries event.

The impact of the roughly 150 m meteorite that created the Steinheim Basin released only about one percent of the energy liberated during the formation of the Ries crater. Approximately two cubic kilometres of rock were displaced. A crater approximately 3.5 km in diameter, originally about 200 m deep and with a prominently developed central uplift, was produced.

=== Craters on the Franconian Jura ===
As early as 1969 — only a few years after the impact origin of both the Ries crater and the Steinheim Basin had been proven — the basin near Pfahldorf close to Kipfenberg, approximately 60 km east of the Ries (48°57′42″N 11°19′54″E), was proposed as another possible meteorite crater with a diameter of 2.5 km. In 1971 the Stopfenheimer Kuppel near Ellingen, about 30 km northeast of the Ries (49°4′18″N 10°53′24″E), with a diameter of 8 km, was interpreted as a possible crater.

The Würzburg geologist Erwin Rutte attributed the origin of a number of additional roughly circular structures on the Franconian Jura, as far as 90 km east of the Ries crater, to meteorite impacts that occurred simultaneously with the Ries impact. Among the structures in question are the Wipfelsfurt at the Danube Gorge near Weltenburg (48°54′12″N 11°50′36″E, 850 m diameter), an elongated depression near Sausthal close to Ihrlerstein (48°58′0″N 11°49′36″E, dimensions 850 × 620 m), the Mendorf basin near Altmannstein (48°52′30″N 11°36′6″E, 2.5 km diameter) and the circular structure at Laaber (49°4′48″N 11°53′54″E, 4.5 km diameter).

The interpretation of these structures as impact craters is controversial.

Unambiguous evidence of a meteorite impact such as diaplectic glasses or high-pressure minerals (coesite, stishovite) has not yet been found. The shatter cones described from the Wipfelsfurt are only poorly developed, so their interpretation as impact indicators remains uncertain. Accordingly, the Wipfelsfurt is now generally regarded as a Danube wash-out feature, while the other circular structures are most likely dolines or tectonic landforms.

=== Possible impact near Lake Constance ===
In the Swiss Alpine foreland around St. Gallen, blocks of Jurassic limestone are found within younger Molasse sediments whose origin remains uncertain. Because of their similarity to the **Reutersche Blöcke** – large limestone blocks that were ejected up to 70 km from the Ries – the possibility has been discussed that a meteorite impact, perhaps contemporaneous with the Ries event, could be responsible. This hypothesis is supported by reported finds of shatter cones.

So far no corresponding crater structure has been identified. It is conceivable that the impact occurred in loose Molasse sands, preventing a crater from being preserved, or that any crater that formed has since been inundated by Lake Constance. Detailed investigations, such as research boreholes, are still outstanding.

== History ==
On one edge of the Nördlinger Ries are the Ofnet Caves, where, at the beginning of the 20th century, archaeologists discovered thirty-three human skulls dating to the Mesolithic period.

The Ries was the site of the Battle of the Ries on 13 May 841.

The landing site for Apollo 14 is a heavily craterized terrain, and one of the science goals of the mission was to sample ejecta from the impact that formed Mare Imbrium. Nördlinger Ries is an easily accessible, large impact crater, making it a convenient analog for lunar craters. Because of this, it was used as a location to train Apollo 14 astronauts, so that they would be able to investigate lunar impact structures and related rocks. Astronauts Alan Shepard and Edgar Mitchell, as well as Apollo 14 backup astronauts Eugene Cernan and Joe Engle, trained here from August 10 to August 14, 1970. Apollo 17 astronauts also trained at Nördlinger Ries.

== In popular culture ==
- In Julian May's Saga of Pliocene Exile series of books, the Nördlinger Rieskessel is an impact crater caused by the crash-landing of an alien ship, setting up the society of humanoid aliens in Pliocene-era Europe.

== See also ==
- Tunguska event
- List of impact craters on Earth
- Planetary defense
