= Planar deformation features =

Microscopic features of silicate grains

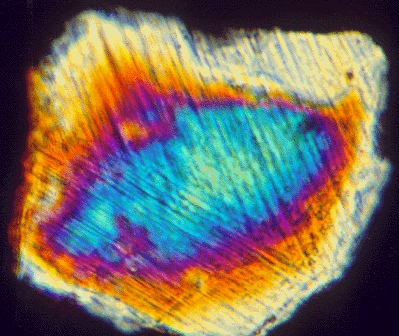
Planar deformation features in quartz identify it as shocked quartz

Planar deformation features, or PDFs, are optically recognizable microscopic features in grains of silicate minerals (usually quartz or feldspar), consisting of very narrow planes of glassy material arranged in parallel sets that have distinct orientations with respect to the grain's crystal structure.

PDFs are only produced by extreme shock compressions on the scale of meteor impacts. They are not found in volcanic environments. Their presence therefore is a primary criterion for recognizing that an impact event has occurred.

== See also ==
- Shocked quartz
- Shock metamorphism
