= N. A. Semashko City Hospital No. 1 =

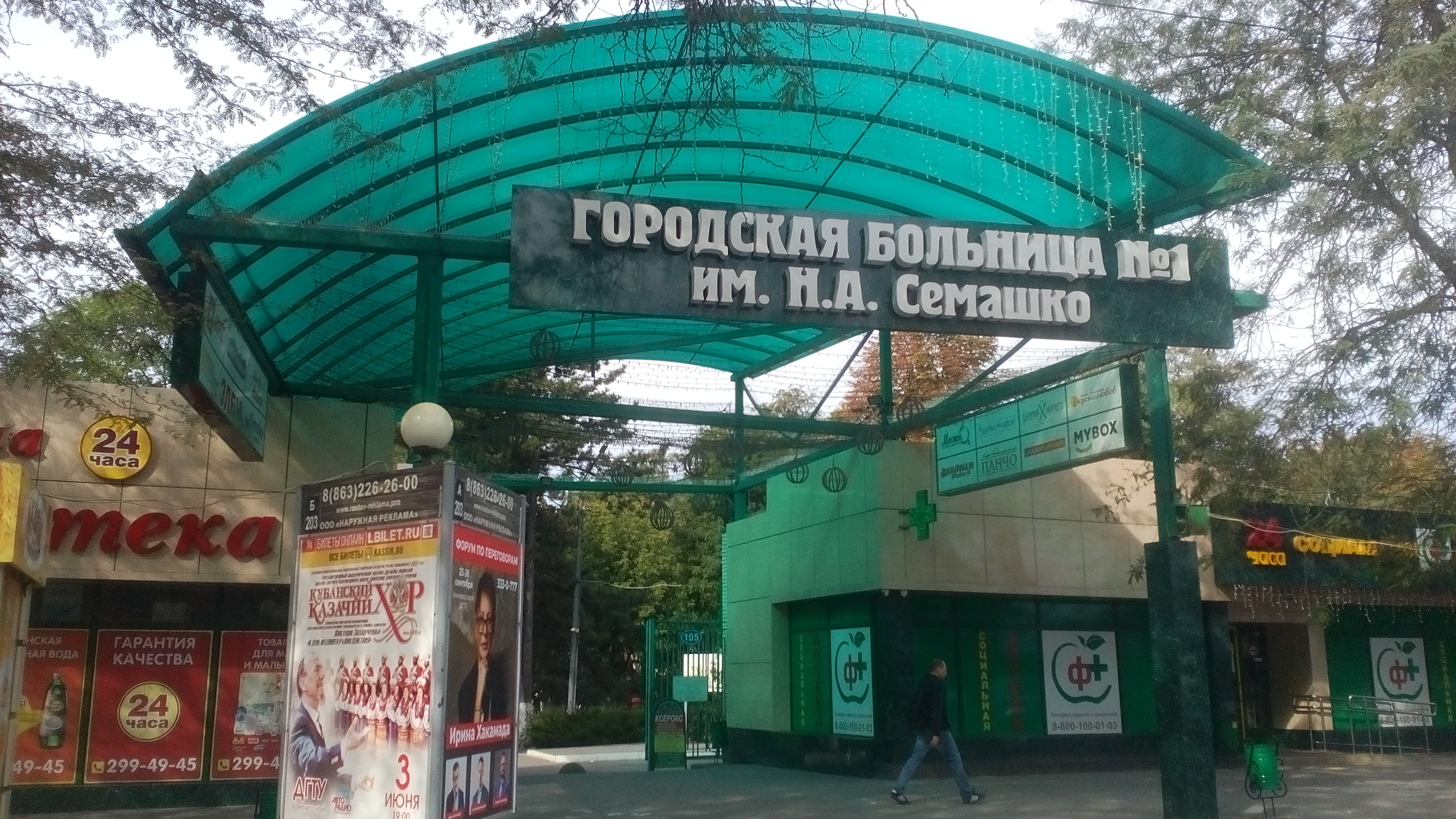

Geography
- Location: Rostov-on-Don, Rostov Oblast, Russia
- Coordinates: 47°14′02″N 39°42′38″E

Organisation
- Type: Municipal budgetary health care institution

History
- Former name: Don District Hospital
- Founded: June 1922

Links
- Lists: Hospitals in Russia

N. A. Semashko City Hospital No. 1 (Russian: Городская больница № 1 имени Н. А. Семашко) is a large hospital in Rostov-on-Don.

== History ==
Central Hospital № 1 of the city of Rostov-on-Don traces its history back in June 1922, when the Don District Hospital was opened in the city. The new hospital was opened on the site of the infectious barracks of the military evacuation hospital, where epidemics of cholera, typhus, dysentery and other diseases of this type were treated. The chief physician of the new hospital was Dr. E. B Libenzon, relative of a Russian American lawyer Ilya Libenzon. In September 1922, the Nikolaev City Hospital moved to the hospital after the medical faculty of the University of Warsaw moved into its former premises. At end of 1922, another surgical department under the leadership of Leon Solomonovich Astvatsaturov started operating. The hospital equipment was the basis of the new hospital's three-room laboratory; the head of the laboratory was Dr. M. I. Shyschal, the first prosector was D.V. Khovansky, who was soon replaced by Professor Shavla Krinitsky.

In 1923, an infectious disease department was established in the hospital. It was designed to solve the problems of fighting typhus, cholera and malaria. The future academician Boris Trusevich became its first head. In the next two years, two more infectious departments were created, later the total number of beds in all three departments reached 300. The children's infectious disease department was designed for 120 patients with scarlet fever. It was headed by Dr. M. E Lansberg.

Between 1926 and 1930 the hospital was reconstructed to the design of Moscow architects Golosov, Grinberg and Ilyin. The new hospital had 2,100 beds, its chief doctor was Dr. S. L. Klyachkin. The therapeutic department of the new hospital occupied a separate two-story building with 220 beds (in 1933 it became the Department of Hospital Therapy of Rostov University, headed by Professor Abram Voronov until 1954, and then by Professor Nikolai Mikhailovich Ivanov).

Since 1931, the hospital had a separate children's hospital with 120 beds, headed by Dr. E. M Grinberg. In 1931 an otolaryngological department was opened.

== Object of cultural heritage ==
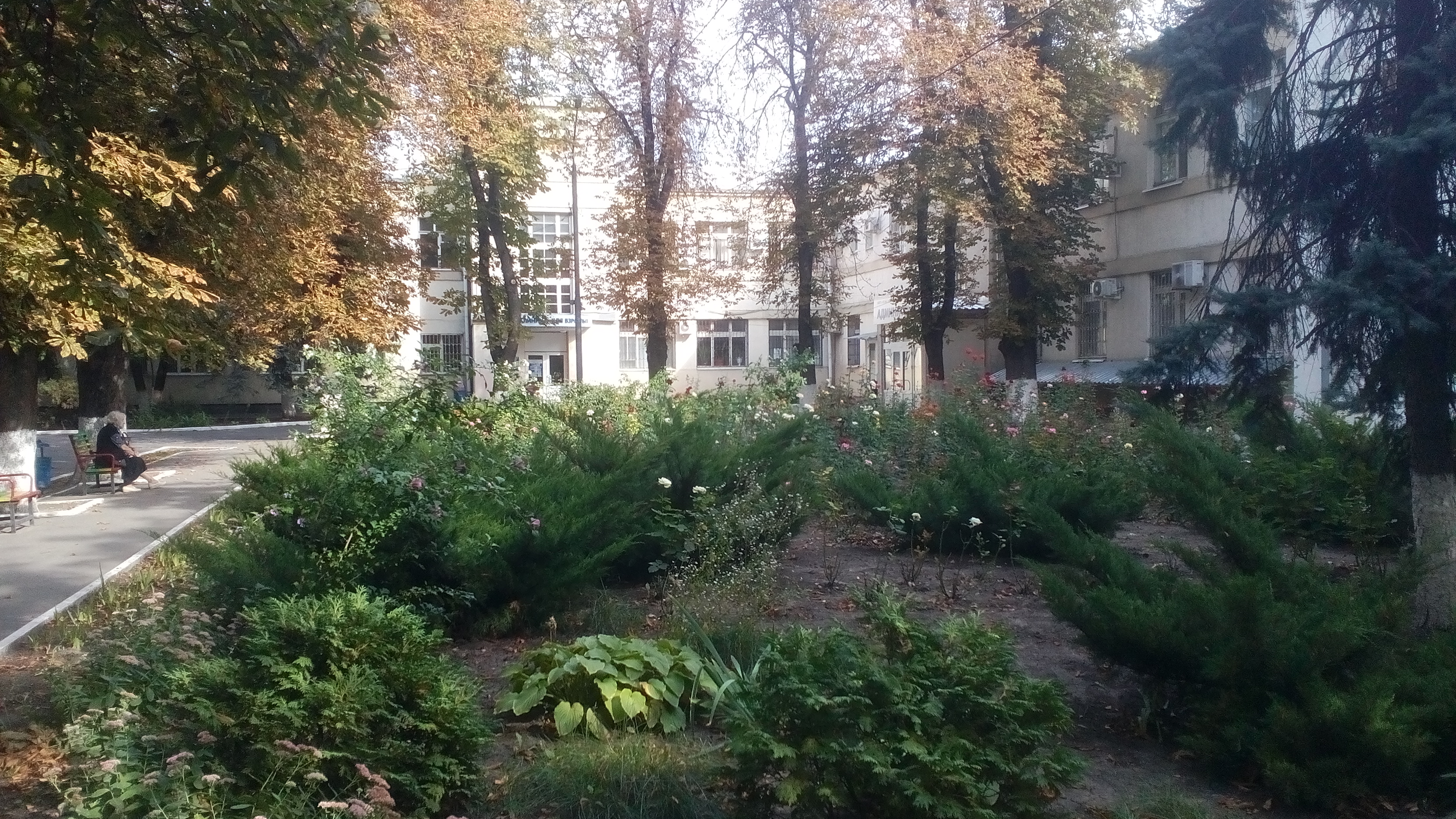
Courtyard and buildings of the hospital

The N. A. Semashko City Hospital No. 1 is one of two architectural monuments of the Soviet avant-garde in Rostov-on-Don, the other being the Rostov Drama Theatre. The facades of the hospital are made of facing silicate bricks, the architecture is functional: the shape of the windows indicate the purpose of the rooms behind them.

When the hospital administration decided to construct a new 12-storey building and to demolish the old buildings, an inquiry was instituted. A compromise solution allowed the combination of the construction of a new building with the preservation of architecturally significant features. But in 2012 the conflict flared up again. The hospital management appealed directly to the governor of Rostov Oblast Vasiliy Golubev. The Regional Office of the All-Russian Society for the Protection of Historical and Cultural Monuments initiated an expert examination in Stavropol and asked for the support of Aleksandr Petrovich Kudryavtsev, the Chairman of the Academic Council for the Protection of the Heritage of the Russian Academy of Architecture and Construction Sciences.

In early 2013, the administration of Rostov Oblast recognized the complex of hospital buildings as an object of cultural heritage of regional significance. In December 2013, the governor authorized the reconstruction of the complex, which will be completed by October 2014.

== See also ==
- Nikolai Semashko (medicine), the hospital's namesake
