= List of hospitals in Russia =

There were 5,300 hospitals in Russia in 2018. The earliest Russian hospitals were established in the 18th century. The hospitals listed in the table below are some of the notable hospitals in Russia during its history. The table includes the name, city in which the hospital is located, year the hospital was established, pertinent comments and references. Many hospitals have more complete articles in the Russian Wikipedia.

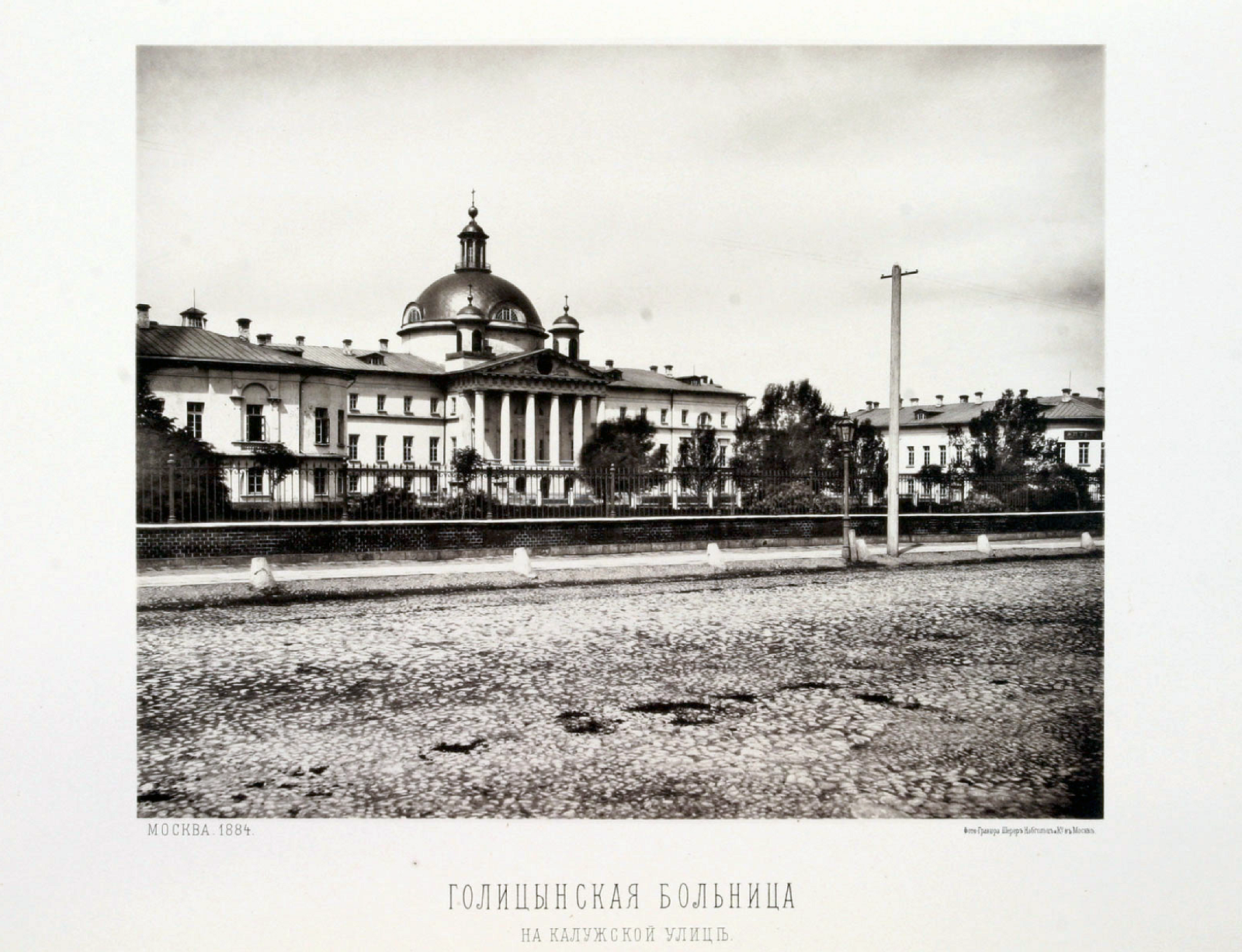
Golitsyn hospital in 1884 (from N.A. Naydenov's album

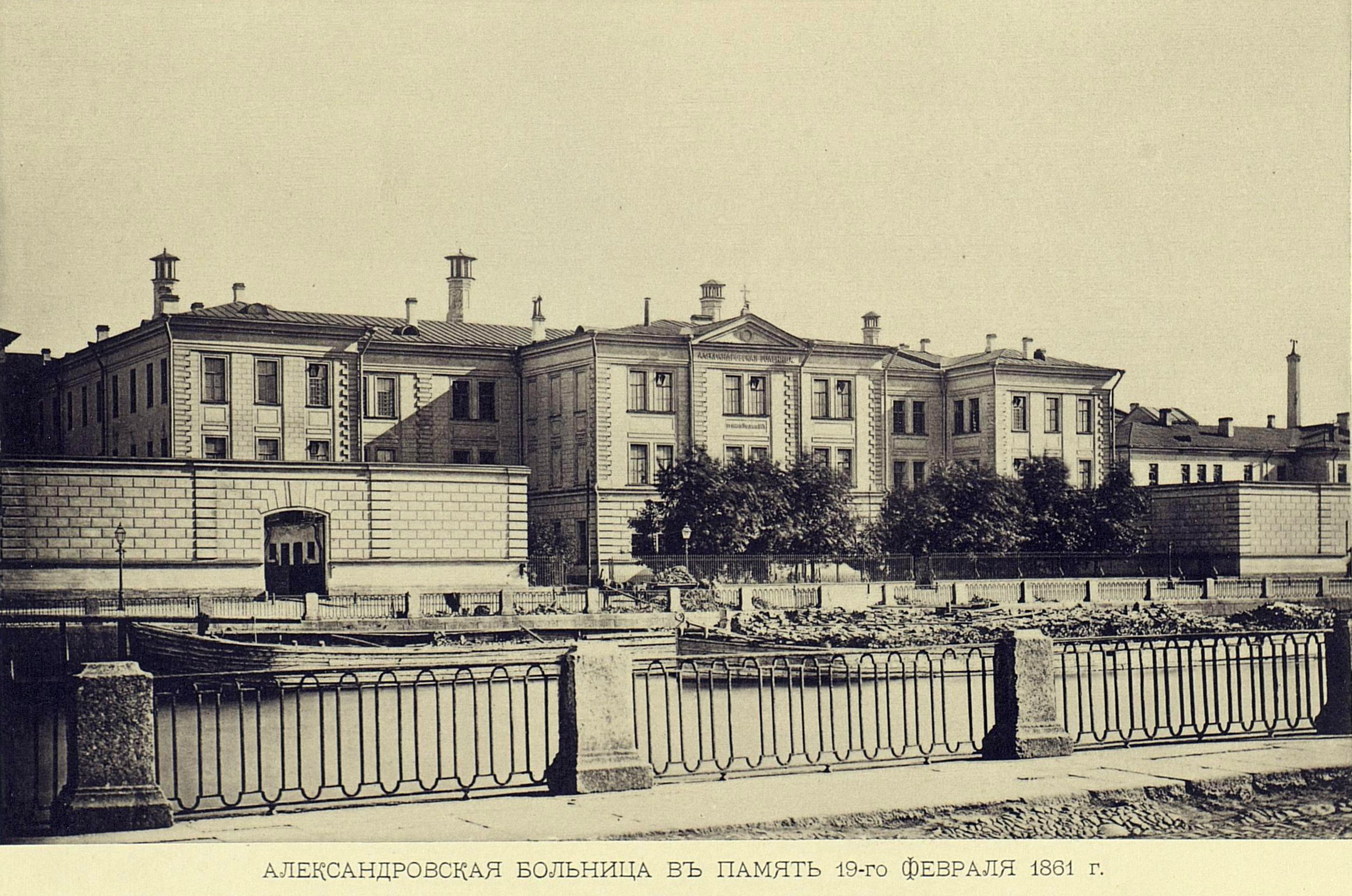
Alexander Hospital in 1878

Hospitals in Russia
Name	Location	Year Established	Comments, Reference
Alexander Hospital	St. Petersburg	1842	After Alexander II of Russia
Anglo-Russian Hospital	Petrograd	1915–1918	
Botkin Hospital (formerly Soldatyonkov Hospital)	Moscow	1910	After Sergey Botkin
Bakhrushin Brothers Hospital	Moscow	1887	
Central Clinical Hospital	Moscow	1957	
Central Clinical Hospital of the Moscow Patriarchate	Moscow	1903	founded by the Russian Orthodox Church
Children's Hospital of St. Mary Magdalene	St. Petersburg	1829	
City Clinical Hospital No. 4 (formerly Pavlovskaya Hospital)	Moscow	1763	
City Clinical Hospital No. 23	Moscow	1866	
City Clinical Hospital No. 63	Moscow		
City Clinical Hospital No. 67 (named after L. A. Vorokhobov)	Moscow	1959	
City Clinical Hospital No. 81 (named after V. V. Veresaev)	Moscow	1937	
City hospital No. 40	St. Petersburg	1740	
Evangelical Hospital	Moscow	1880	
Federal Center of Neurosurgery	Tyumen	2011	
Golitsyn Hospital	Moscow	1802	
Lesnoye Sanatorium	Tolyatti	1910	
Burdenko Main Military Clinical Hospital (named after N.N.Burdenko)	Moscow	1706	first state medical institution in Russia
Mariinskaya Hospital	St. Petersburg	1803	
Maternity Hospital No. 6 (named after V. F. Snegiryov)	St. Petersburg	1771	Established by Catherine the Great; birthplace of Vladimir Putin.
Moscow Eye Hospital	Moscow	1826	one of the oldest eye hospitals in the world (associated with the Helmholtz National Medical Research Center for Eye Diseases)
N.A. Semashko City Hospital No. 1	Rostov-on-Don	1922	
Novosibirsk Psychiatric Hospital No. 3	Novosibirsk	1929	
Psychiatric Clinical Hospital No. 1, named after N. A. Alekseev	Moscow	1894	
Russian Ilizarov Scientific Center for Restorative Traumatology and Orthopaedics	Kurgan	1971	
Serbsky Center	Moscow	1921	
Saint Petersburg Children's Hospice	Saint Petersburg	2003	
St Petersburg Psychiatric Hospital of Specialized Type with Intense Observation	St. Petersburg	1951	
Sklifosovsky Research Institute of Emergency Medicine	Moscow	1810	
State Autonomous Healthcare Institution of the Yaroslavl Region	Yaroslavl	1781	
Yeleninskaya Hospital	St. Petersburg	1909	

== See also ==
- Category:Hospital ships of the Soviet Union and Russia
  - List of Russian Fleet hospital ships
- Healthcare in Russia
- History of hospitals
- Hospitals
- Psikhushka, Russian ironic diminutive for Psychiatric hospital
- Category:Russian hospitals by city on Russian Wikipedia
