= Russian Medical Fund =

Russian Medical Fund was a humanitarian organization founded in Vienna, Virginia, to support medical care for children in Saint Petersburg, Russia, during the post-Soviet period.

Russian Medical Fund provided supplies, equipment, and physician training to the pediatric cardiac unit of Children's Hospital #1 of Saint Petersburg. The fund provided for a new 7-bed pediatric intensive care unit, purchased a heart-lung machine, and underwrote a complete renovation of the congenital surgery operating suite. In addition, RMF advocated the continuation of U.S. funding for civil society programs there and co-sponsored humanitarian and medical work being done by a related organization, Global Healing.

The organization was created as a private foundation in 1996 and continued operations until 2008. The fund was affiliated with the American International Health Alliance.

== See also ==
- Healthcare in Russia
