= Federal Compulsory Medical Insurance Fund (Russia) =

- Федеральный фонд обязательного медицинского страхования (ФФОМС)
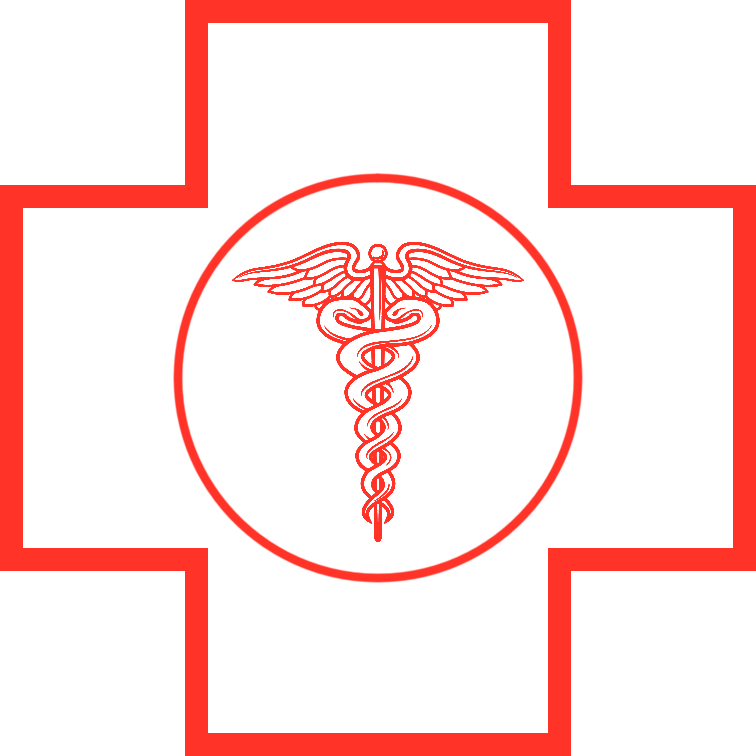
- Logo of the Federal Compulsory Medical Insurance Fund

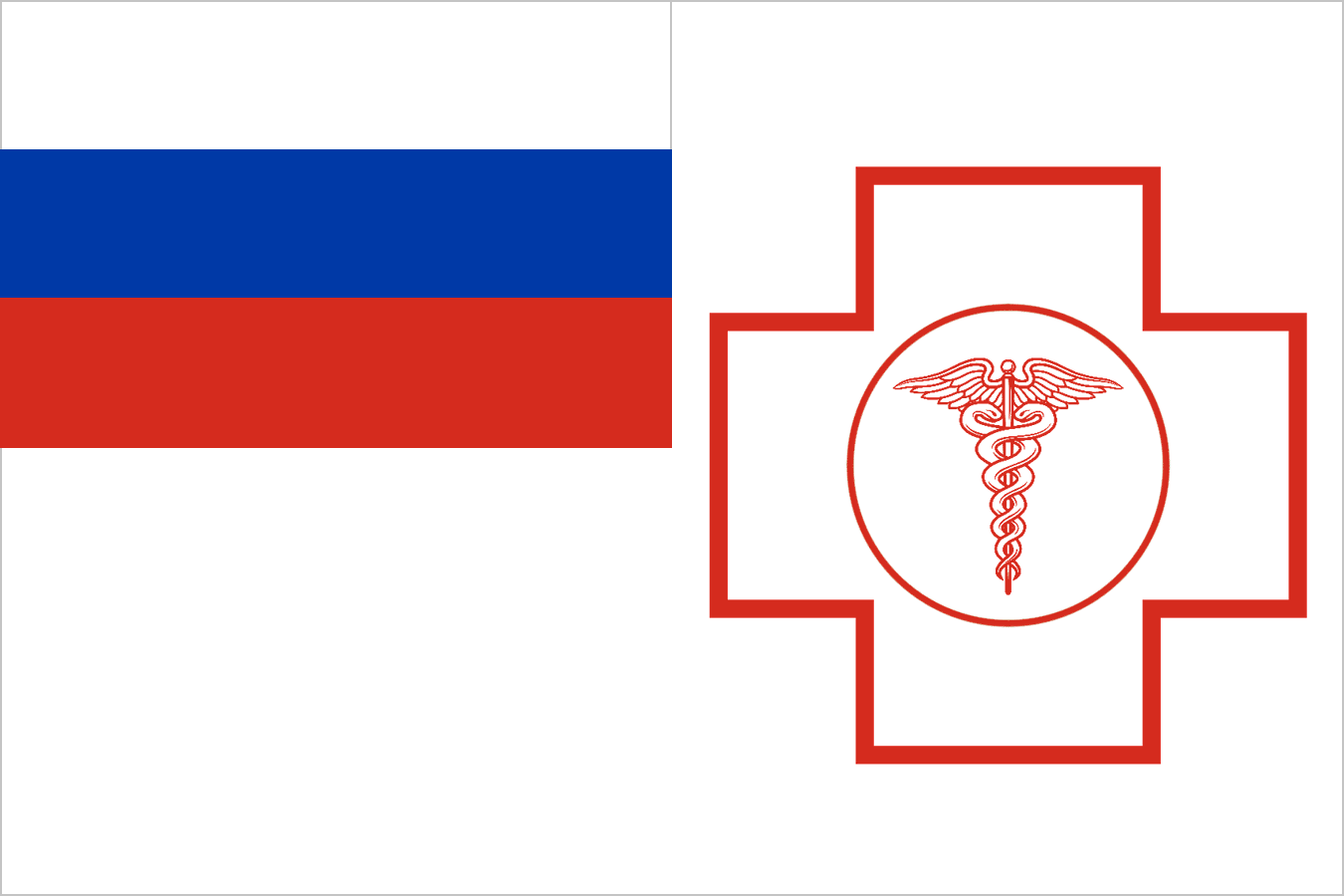
- Flag of Federal Compulsory Medical Insurance Fund

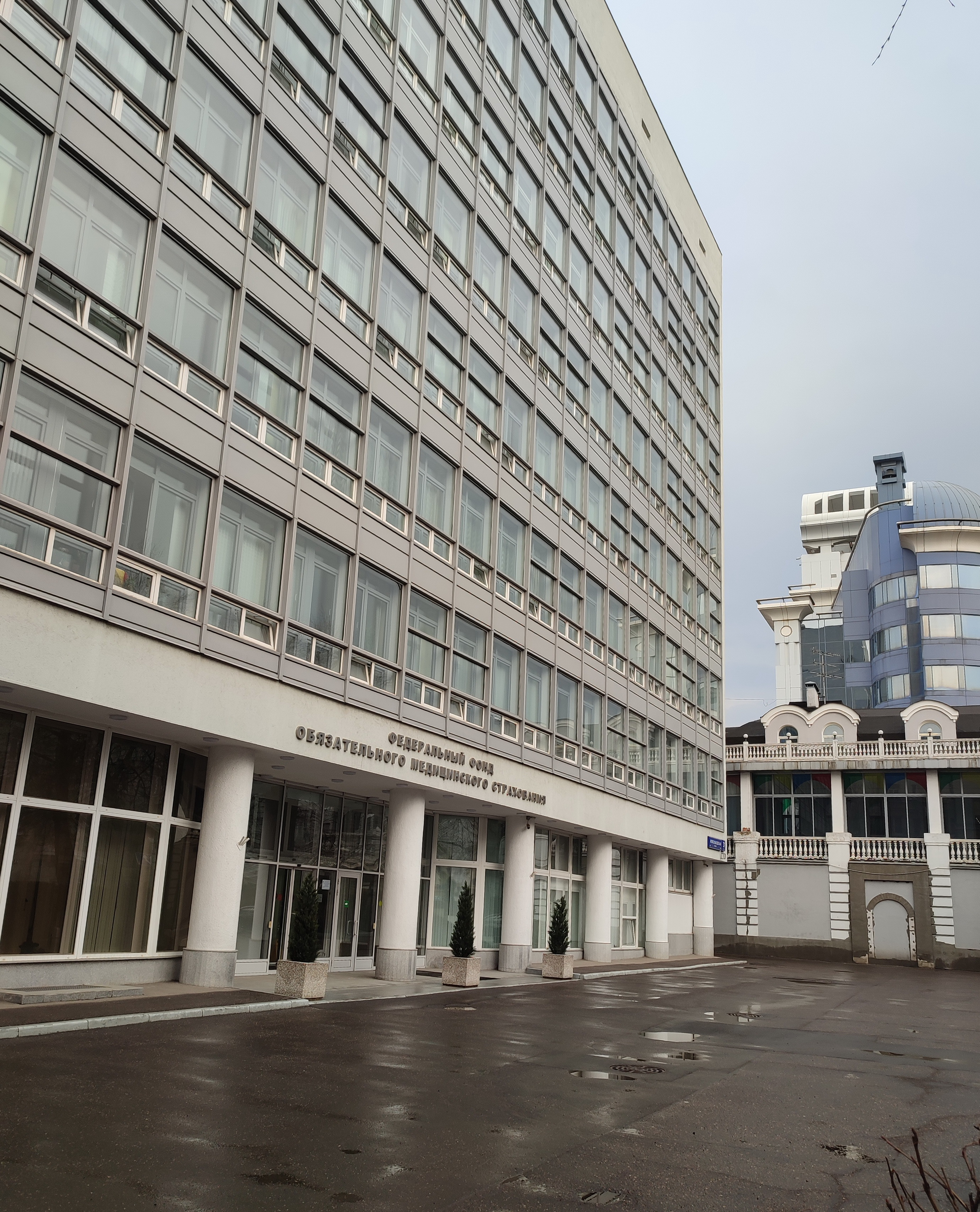

Federal service overview
- Formed: February 24, 1993
- Headquarters: Novoslobodskaya ulitsa, 37/4A, Moscow, Russia; 55°46′47″N 37°35′48″E
- Federal service executive: Elena Chernyakova
- Parent ministry: Ministry of Health
- Website: Ffoms.gov.ru

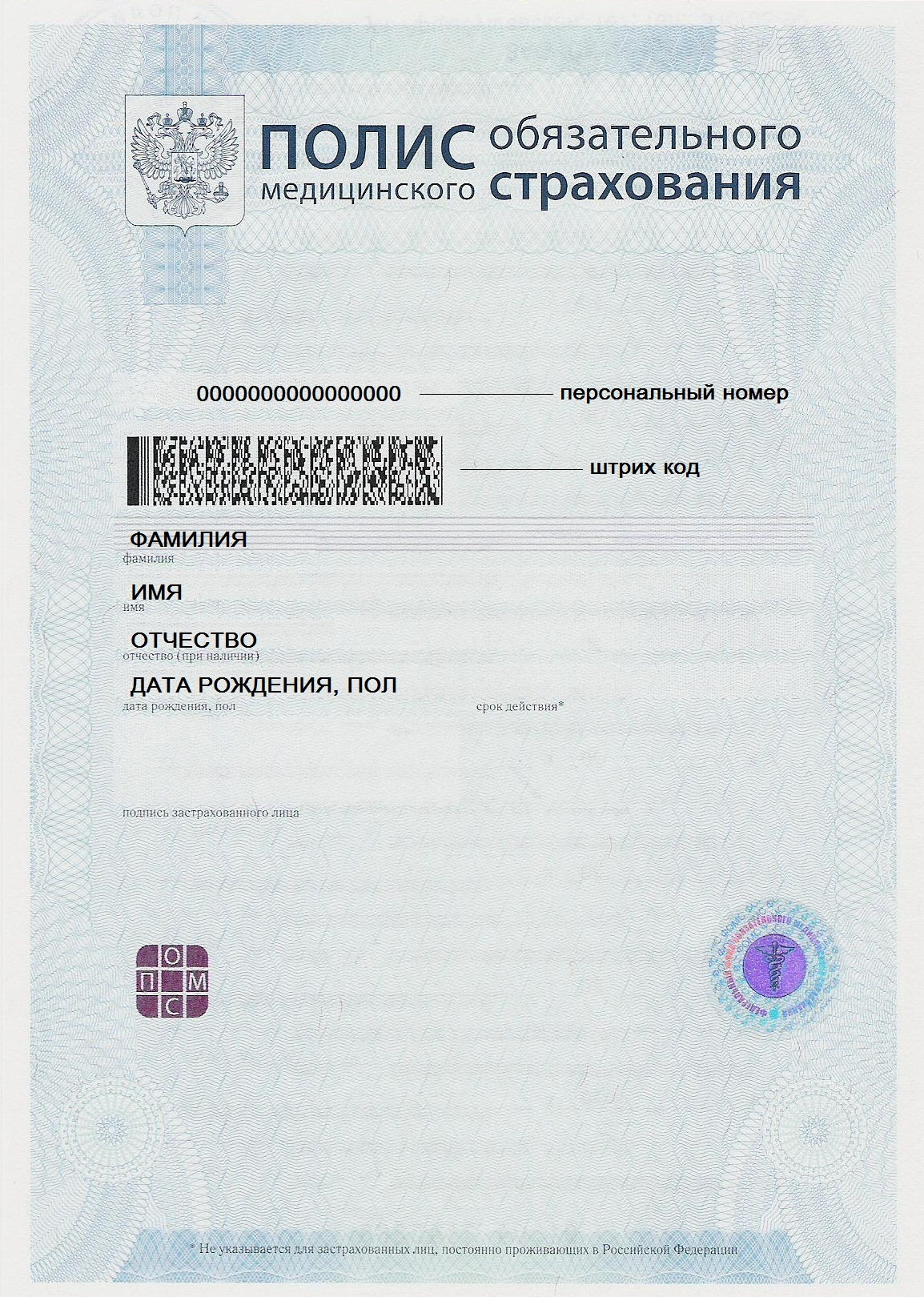
Insurance policy of the Medical Insurance Fund

Federal Compulsory Medical Insurance Fund (FFOMS) (Russian: Федеральный фонд обязательного медицинского страхования (ФФОМС)) is one of the state extra-budgetary funds (i.e. fund is not a part of federal or regional budgets) established to finance medical services to Russian citizens. Created on February 24, 1993, by decision of the Supreme Soviet of the RSFSR No. 4543-I.

The activities of the fund are governed by the Budget Code of Russia and the Russian law entitled "On Compulsory Health Insurance in the Russian Federation", and other laws and regulations. Among the key features of the fund:

- Leveling the activity of territorial compulsory medical insurance funds for financing the program of compulsory health insurance.
- Funding targeted programs under the Compulsory Health Insurance.
- Control over rational use of funds of compulsory health insurance

== Heads ==
- Grishin, Vladimir (1993–1998)
- Taranov, Andrei (1998–2006)
- Reyhart, Dmitry (Acting, 2006–2008)
- Jurin, Andrei (2008–2012)
- Stadchenko, Natalia (2012–2020)
- Chernyakova, Elena (2020–2022)
- Balanin, Ilya (2022–present)

== See also ==
- Health care systems by country#Russia
- Healthcare in Russia
