= Administrative Building of Rostov University =

Building in Russia

Administrative Building of Rostov (Warsaw) University
- Административный корпус Ростовского (Варшавского) университета
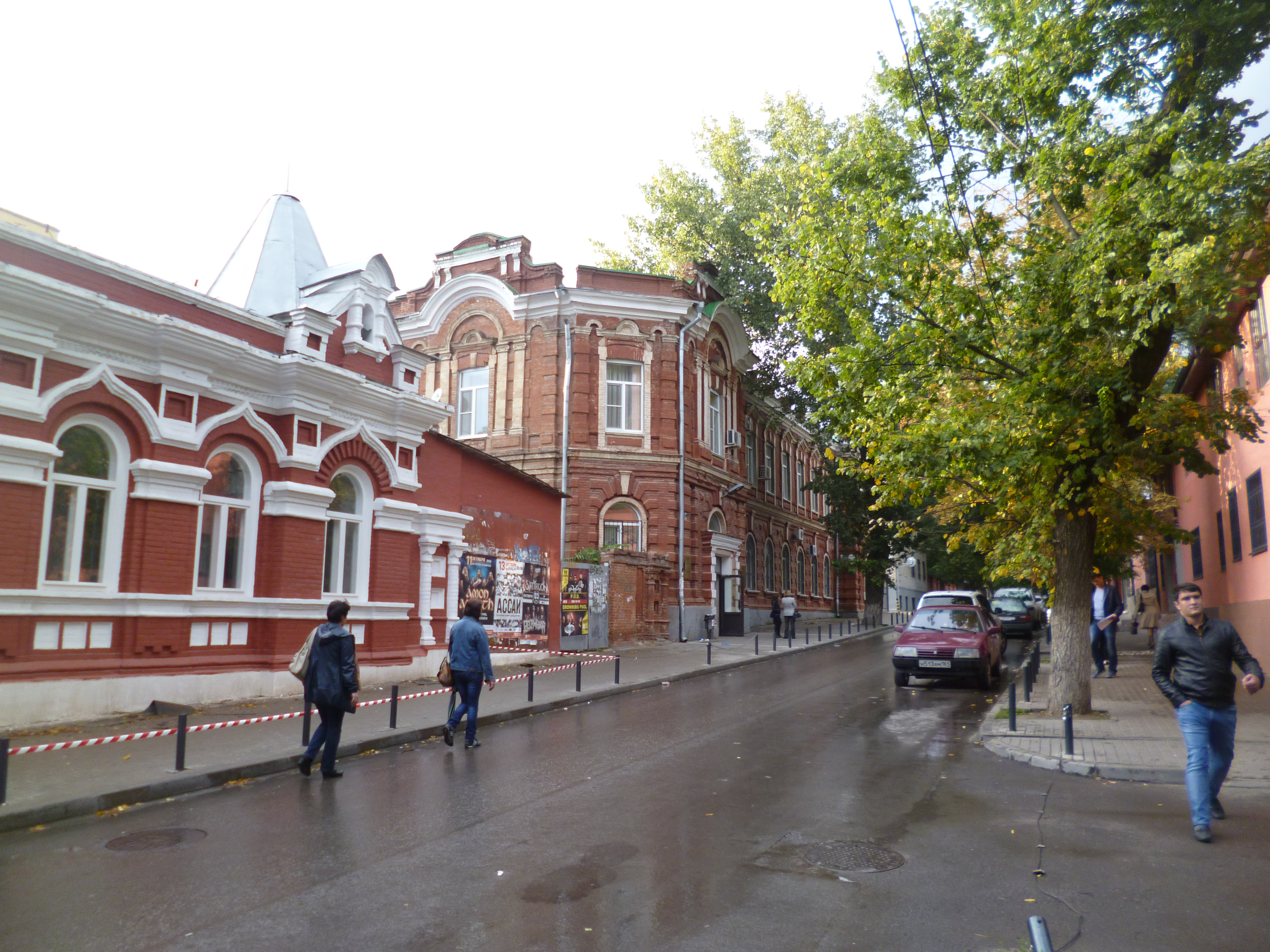
- Rostov University Building (in background)
- Interactive map of the Administrative Building of Rostov (Warsaw) University area

General information
- Type: Administrative building
- Location: Rostov-on-Don, Russia
- Coordinates: 47°13′41″N 39°44′17″E
- Completed: 1897

Design and construction
- Architect: Nikolai Sokolov (supposedly)

The Administrative Building of Rostov (Warsaw) University (Russian: Административный корпус Ростовского (Варшавского) университета) is a building in Rostov-on-Don constructed in 1897. Initially it formed a part of the Nikolaev City Hospital building complex. From 1915 it housed the Medical Faculty of the University of Warsaw, which had been evacuated to Rostov-on-Don during the First World War. It currently houses the administration of Rostov State Medical University and has the status of an object of cultural heritage of Russia of regional significance.

== History and description ==
The building's architect was supposedly Nikolai Sokolov. The two-story building is constructed of brick and has a pitched metal roof. The facades are not plastered. The main facade is situated on Nakhichevan Pereulok. On the sides there are two rizalites with attics. The tiered division of the facade is emphasized by belt courses. The walls are rusticed; the window openings of the first and second floors have different shapes: they are decorated with pediments, platbands and keystones. The windows of the lateral risalites at the second floor are decorated with twin pilasters with archivolts and with an arcuate cornice. Overall the building has a complex configuration.

=== Memorial plaque ===
In 1984, a memorial plaque with the following inscription was installed on the building:

In Rostov State Medical Institute from 1916 to 1957 worked professor Nikolai Rozhansky, a full member of the Academy of Medical Sciences and an Honoured Scientist of the RSFSR (1884—1957)

== Literature ==
- Панков Г. И. Кузница медицинских кадров. Очерки истории Ростовского медицинского института. — Ростов-на-Дону, 1968. — С. 3—13, 15, 43, 71.
