= Scientific Research Institute of Nutrition =

Russian research institute

- Established: 1930
- Chair: Viktor Tutelyan
- Formerly called: State Central Institute of the RSFSR
- Location: Moscow, Russia
- Website: www.ion.ru

Formerly known as the Scientific Research Institute of Nutrition of the Russian Academy of Medical Sciences, the Institute of Nutrition is a Federal Russian state-owned budgetary entity. It is currently located in Moscow, Russia.

== History ==
In 1927, the All-Union Conference on public food service was held in the Russian Soviet Federative Socialist Republic (RSFSR). The People's Commissar of Public Health N.A. Semashko raised the issue of a central agency on nutrition. This agency was to lead and coordinate scientific work in the field of nutrition. Established on July 26, 1930, the Institute of Nutrition was originally named the State Central Institute of the RSFSR. It was intended to methodically guide research in the field of nutrition throughout the Soviet Union

The Academy of Medical Sciences of the USSR was formed in 1944. Thereafter, the Institute of Nutrition became the section of the academy responsible for hygiene, microbiology and epidemiology. Later, responsibility for the section of preventive medicine was added. Since then, the Institute of Nutrition has been led by prominent Soviet and Russian scientists including M.F. Merezhinsky, S.E. Severin, O.P. Molchanov, A.A. Pokrovskii, M.F. Nesterin, V.A. Shaternikov.

Since 2000, the head of the institute is academician RAMS Viktor Tutelyan.

== Notable Scientists ==
Many talented researchers of the Institute of Nutrition have influenced the development of the science of nutrition, including:

=== Sharpenak, Anatoly Ernestovich - (1895 - 1969) ===
Anatoly Sharpenak was a scholar and professor of biochemistry. For more than 25 years, he was the head of the Laboratory of Protein Metabolism of the Institute of Nutrition (now - Laboratory of metabolism and energy). Working at the Institute of Nutrition, A.E. Sharpenak, who studied protein metabolism, has made a definite contribution to the understanding of the indispensability of some amino acids and their optimum balance. Sharpenak's studies of protein metabolism have gained international recognition.
