= Saint Petersburg Psychiatric Hospital of Specialized Type with Intense Observation =

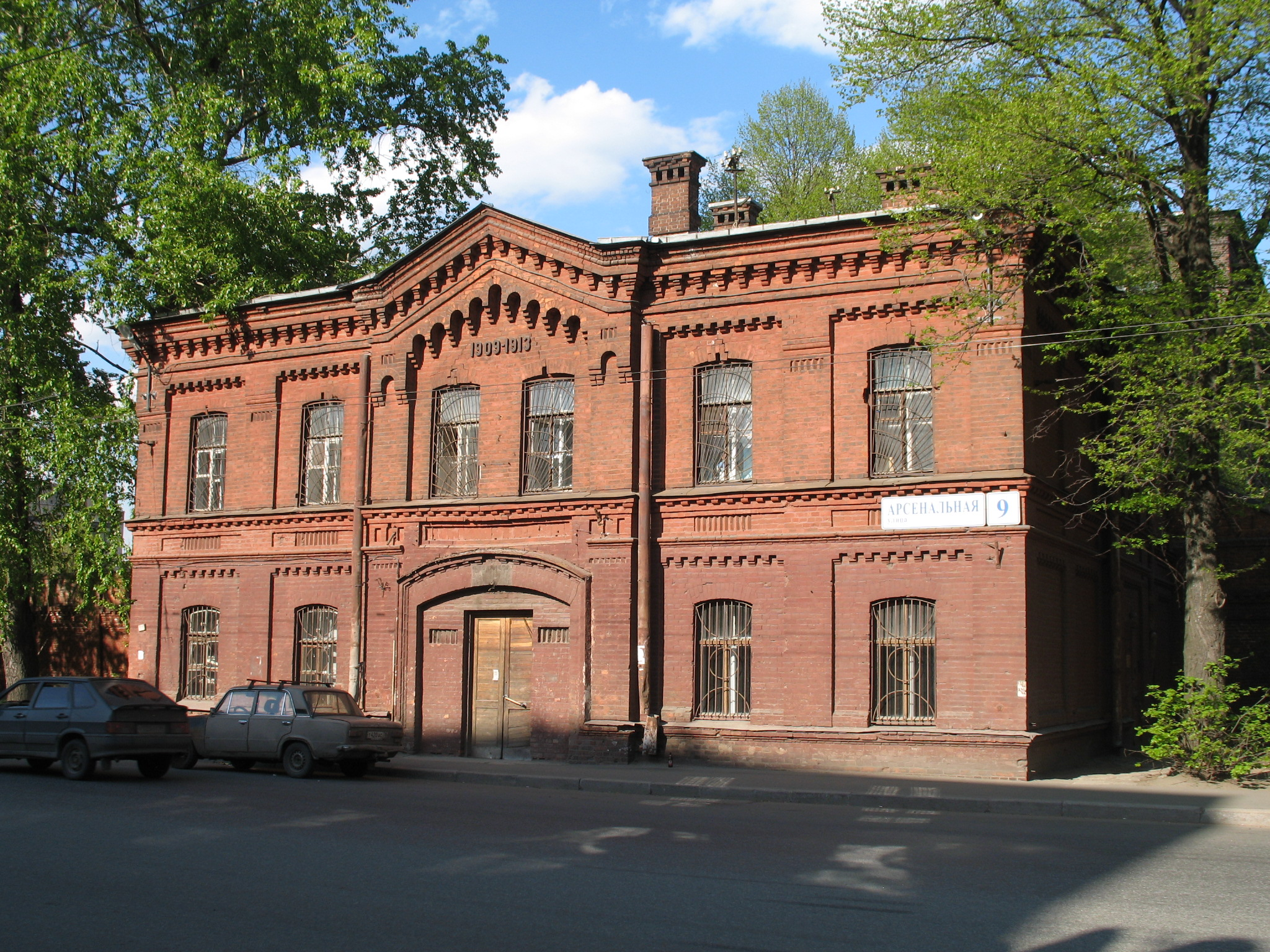

Geography
- Location: 9 Arsenalnaya street, St. Petersburg, 195009, Russia
- Coordinates: 59°57′36″N 30°22′20″E

Organisation
- Type: Psychiatric hospital

Services
- Beds: 680

History
- Founded: 1951

Links
- Lists: Hospitals in Russia

Saint Petersburg Psychiatric Hospital of Specialized Type with Intense Observation (SPbPBSTIN) (Russian: Санкт-Петербургская психиатрическая больница специализированного типа с интенсивным наблюдением, СПбПБСТИН) is one of eight Russian psychiatric hospitals under federal control for the treatment and rehabilitation of mentally ill persons who committed socially dangerous acts in a state of insanity and were released from criminal responsibility under court decision. In the Soviet time, the hospital was called the Leningrad Special Psychiatric Hospital of Prison Type of the USSR Ministry of Internal Affairs.

== History ==
The year of the foundation of SPbPBSTIN is 1951 when the Leningrad Special Psychiatric Hospital Prison Type of the USSR Ministry of Internal Affairs was organized by order of the interior minister S. N. Kruglov.

=== Pre-revolutionary period ===
The psychiatric hospital was established in the building of a former female prison built in Saint Petersburg between 1909 and 1913 on the Vyborg Side, in an area that was given the name Kulikovo Field.

As early as the 1870s, on the proposal of the Commission for Arranging Prison Sector, the Saint Petersburg City Duma allocated a public land plot of 4,800 square sazhens to the Ministry of Internal Affairs. In 1882, the Main Prison Department acquired 6,000 square sazhens of land more to construct residential buildings for the prison staff.

The constructed female prison had 816 mass cells, 123 solitary cells, 79 medical cells, and workshops with a total area of 426.49 square sazhens. There was also an income-producing laundry affiliated with the prison.

=== Soviet period (1918-1950) ===
On 6 January 1918, all institutions subordinate to the General Administration of Places of Confinement, and their buildings including the Petrograd Female Prison were transferred to the Prison Board of the RSFSR People's Commissariat (Ministry) for Justice. A general hospital covering many branches and medical specialities, situated in the grounds of the prison, was transferred to the People's Commissariat for Popular Health. This situation continued until 1932 when the hospital was also transferred to the Prison Department.

== The Leningrad SPH ==
From 1951 onwards, as the Leningrad Special Psychiatric Hospital or SPH the institution became part of the punitive apparatus of the Soviet State.

One of those incarcerated in the hospital was the mathematician Revolt Pimenov. As a student in the late 1940s he refused to join the Komsomol and was therefore adjudged to be not in his right mind.

Of particular concern, in the USSR and abroad, was the detention of healthy opponents of the Soviet regime for unlimited terms of imprisonment in such institutions. In January 1971, one inmate of the Leningrad SPH circulated an appeal to the world outside.

== See also ==
- Political abuse of psychiatry in the Soviet Union
