= Saint Petersburg Children's Hospice =

St. Petersburg Children's Hospice
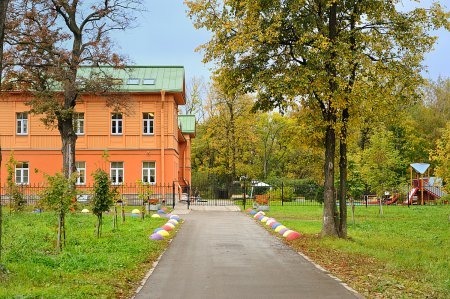

Geography
- Location: Saint Petersburg; 1) 56 Babushkina ul., Bldg. 3, lit. A 2) village of Ol'gino, 23 Konnolahtinsky Prospect, Lit A, Russia
- Coordinates: 59.868705°N 30.462663°E (River Station), 59.837454°N 29.922313°E (Ol'gino)

Organisation
- Care system: All
- Type: Non-profit charitable organization

Services
- Emergency department: Yes

History
- Opened: 2003 (by Archpriest Alexander Tkachenko)

Links
- Website: http://www.kidshospice.ru/
- Other links: http://www.детскийхоспис.рф

The Medical institution "Children's Hospice" (Russian: Медицинское учреждение «Детский хоспис») - is a non-profit institution of pediatric palliative care for minors under 18 years. The first children's hospice in Russia.

The St. Petersburg Children's Hospice has two facilities: one in the city park “Kurakina Dacha” near the St. Petersburg River Station and another one in the village of Ol'gino. The Children's Hospice provides physical, psychological, emotional, social and spiritual care. The basic idea of the hospice care is to enable children with severe and incurable diseases and all members of the child's family to live a full life.

== History ==
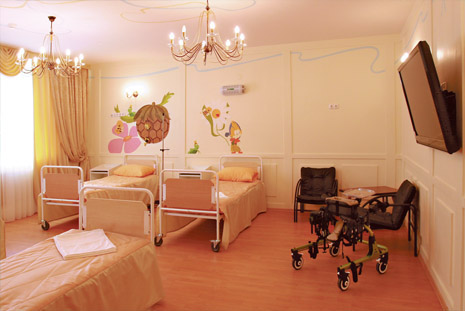
One of the wards of the round-the-clock care station

The St. Petersburg Children's Hospice started its work in 2003 under the guidance of Archpriest Alexander Tkachenko. In 2010, the Children's Hospice became the first governmental institution providing pediatric palliative care in Russia. The first inpatient facility was opened in the “Kurakina Dacha” building – the former “Nikolayevsky” orphanage. The second facility for children of the Leningrad Oblast (and other regions of Russia) was opened in the village of Ol'gino situated in the Resort District of St. Petersburg.

In its early years, the Children's Hospice was a home-based service consisting of doctors, social workers, nurses and psychologists. The aim was to provide hospice outpatient care to terminally ill children and their families.

The St. Petersburg Children's Hospice has become a model for the establishment of such institutions in the city of Moscow, the Moscow Oblast and other regions of Russia .

The appearance of the inpatient facility in St. Petersburg was preceded by 7 years of work by hospice employees. On June 1, 2010, on its seventh birthday, the St. Petersburg Children's Hospice opened the doors of the inpatient facility "Magic House" for seriously ill children. When visiting the Children's Hospice on November 20, 2010, Kirill, the Patriarch of the Russian Orthodox Church, said:

“Today, on such a personal day for myself, I am happy to visit the hospice, and believe me that perhaps the most beautiful gifts that I have been presented today are faces of doctors, attendants, and parents testifying to their courage and faith, and of course, the children who are going through this suffering for reasons unknown to our human mind”.

On November 21, 2011, Federal Law No 323 "On the Fundamentals of Health Protection in the Russian Federation" was passed, in which Article 36 "Palliative medical care" was added at the initiative of the St. Petersburg Children's Hospice. The Children's Hospice staff participated in the development of methodical guidelines for professionals and parents.

In 2012–2013, under the auspices of the hospice, several palliative medical care services were opened in Leningrad and Moscow regions. In 2015, it is planned to complete the construction of a second inpatient facility of the St. Petersburg State Autonomous Healthcare Institution (SAHI) “Children’s Hospice”.

In 2011, the Children's Hospice founder, Archpriest Alexander Tkachenko, received St Andrew the First-Called Foundation Award "For Faith and Loyalty". In March 2013, Archpriest Alexander Tkachenko and the Children's Hospice executive director Pavel Krupnik were awarded the Certificates of Honor by the Federation Council, the upper house of the Federal Assembly of Russia. On July 31, 2014, in the Kremlin, Russian president Vladimir Putin awarded Archpriest Alexander Tkachenko the governmental mark of distinction "For Beneficence".

== Structure of the Children's Hospice ==
The St. Petersburg Children's Hospice is structured as follows:

=== Home-Based Service ===
The St. Petersburg Children's Hospice has run the home-based service since its very inception. The physicians, nurses, psychologists and social workers of the service regularly visit families in the care of the hospice and provide them with counseling, medical and psychological assistance. The service oversees about 300 children living in St. Petersburg and the Leningrad region.

=== Round-the-clock Care Station ===
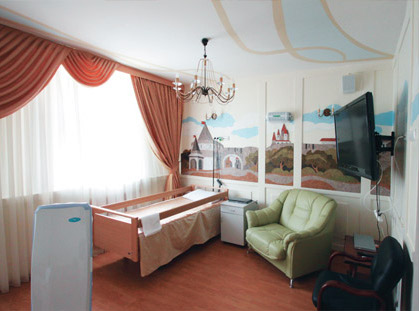

The station is designed for round-the-clock care for 20 patients and, in addition, for 10 patients from the daycare station. The length of stay depends on individual needs of a child and his family. The purpose of the care station is to stabilize and possibly improve the child's state of health, as well as to provide respite care for the family. The care station provides the children with all necessary medical and psychological rehabilitation opportunities. The interior of the entire inpatient facility is different from public children's hospitals. There are no wards with white walls. Instead, there are rooms decorated with drawings for children living together with their mothers. All the furnishings inside the hospice facility are designed to improve the child's emotional state.

=== Intensive Care Unit ===
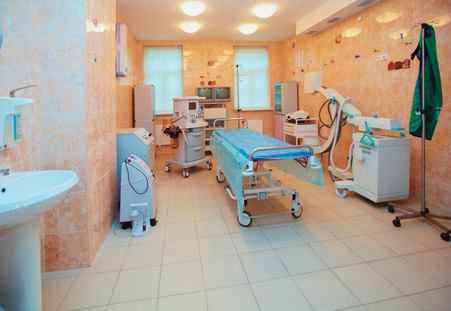

The Intensive Care Unit consists of wards with modern equipment and is designed for round-the-clock observation of children who have reached a terminal state.

=== Daycare Station ===
At the daycare station the children enjoy the same range of services as in the round-the-clock station, but they do not stay overnight.

== Management ==
The St. Petersburg Children's Hospice Director is Russian Orthodox Church archpriest Alexander Tkachenko. He is also considered the main inspirer of establishing children's palliative care as a separate branch of the Russian healthcare system.

== Financing ==
According to data from 2013, the St. Petersburg city budget allocates to the St. Petersburg State Autonomous Healthcare Institution “Children’s Hospice” about 50 million rubles a year. The non-profit Medical Institution “Children’s Hospice” finances itself solely by donations.

== Gallery ==
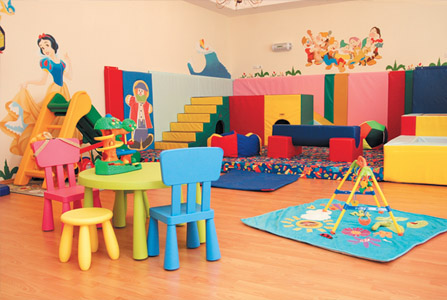
Daycare Station

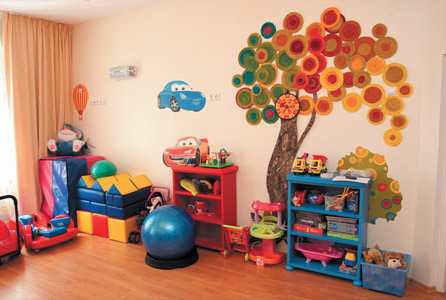
Daycare Station

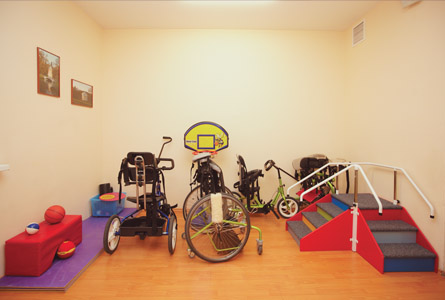

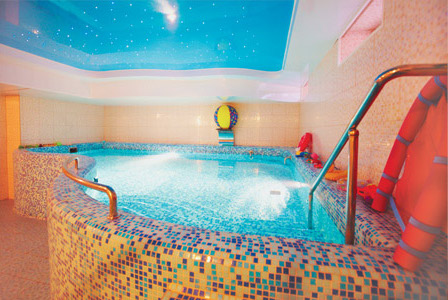

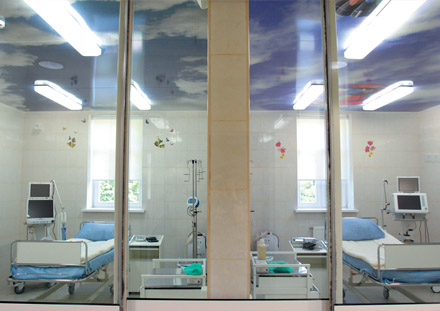
Intensive Care Unit

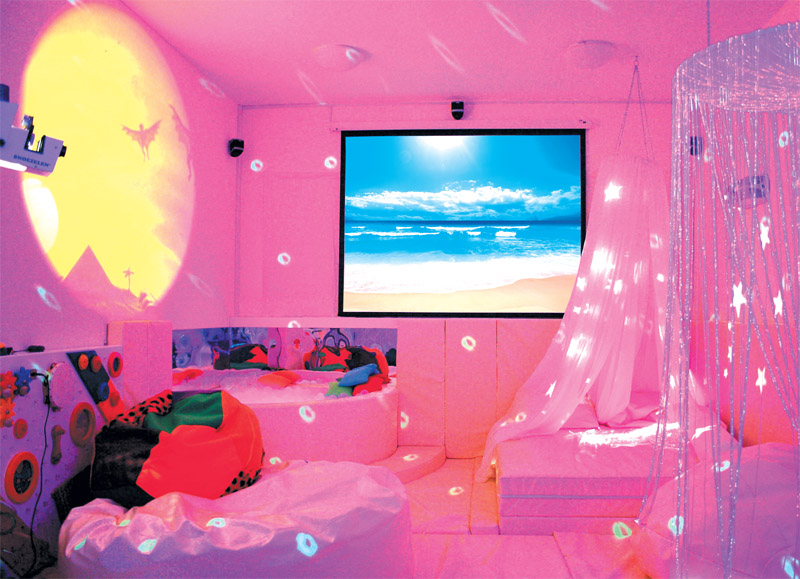
Sensory Room
