= Nikolai Semashko (medicine) =

Russian revolutionary, Soviet bureaucrat and physician (1874–1949)

- Николай Семашко
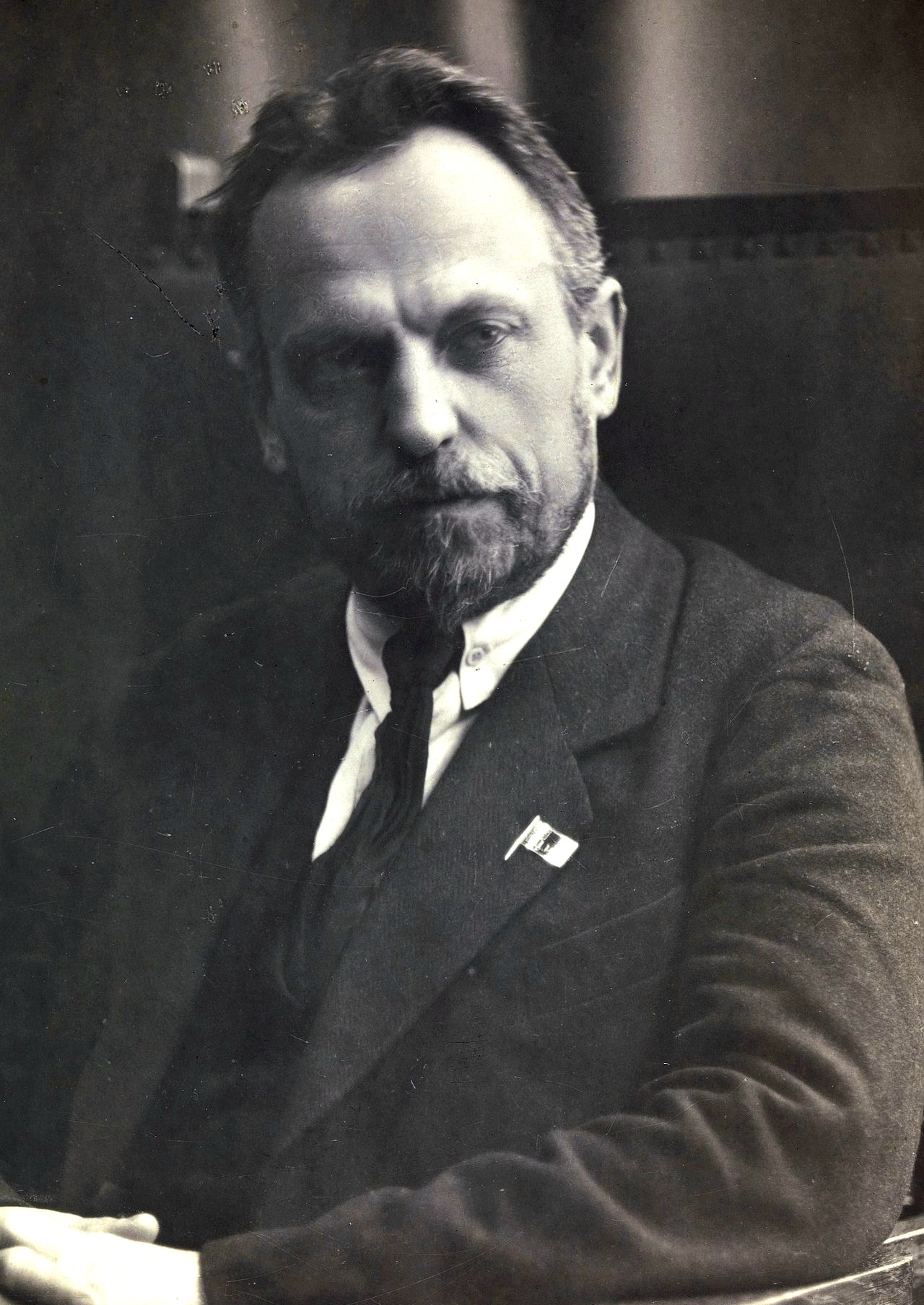
- Semashko in 1922

People's Commissar of Health of the Russian SFSR
- In office 18 July 1918 – 25 January 1930
- Preceded by: Position established
- Succeeded by: Mikhail Vladimirsky

Personal details
- Born: 26 September 1874 Livenskaya, Russian Empire
- Died: 18 May 1949 (aged 74) Moscow, Russian SFSR, Soviet Union
- Resting place: Novodevichy Cemetery, Moscow
- Party: RSDLP (Bolsheviks) (1904–1918); Communist Party (1918–1949)
- Education: Kazan University
- Occupation: Physician

Nikolai Aleksandrovich Semashko (Russian: Никола́й Алекса́ндрович Сема́шко; 26 September [O.S. 14 September] 1874 – 18 May 1949) was a Russian revolutionary and Soviet bureaucrat and physician who became People's Commissar of Public Health in 1918, and served in that role until 1930. He was one of the organizers of the health system in the Soviet Union (often called the Semashko system), an academician of the Academy of Medical Sciences (1944) and of the Russian SFSR (1945).

== Early life ==
Nikolai Semashko was born to a teacher in the village of Livenskaya in the Russian Empire's Oryol Governorate (in present-day Lipetsk Oblast). His mother was a sister of Georgi Plekhanov.

In 1891, after graduating from the Yelets gymnasium (where he studied with Mikhail Prishvin), Semashko entered the medical faculty of Moscow University. In 1893 he became a member of a Marxist group. In 1895, for his participation in the revolutionary movement, he was arrested and exiled to his home in Livenskoe, under strict police surveillance. In 1901 he graduated from the medical faculty of Kazan University, after which he worked as a doctor in Oryol and in Samara. In 1904 he was an active member of the Nizhny Novgorod Committee of the Russian Social Democratic Labour Party (RSDLP); during the 1905 Russian Revolution he co-organized the strike at the Sormovo Factory, for which he was again arrested.

In 1906 he emigrated to Switzerland and lived in Geneva, where he met with Vladimir Lenin. In August 1907, Semashko served as a delegate from the Geneva Bolshevik organization at the International Socialist Congress of the Second International. The Swiss police arrested him after Olga (Sarra) Ravich, convicted in the case of the 1907 Tiflis expropriation, sent him a letter from prison.

In 1908, together with the Bolshevik foreign center, he moved to Paris, where until 1910 he worked as secretary of the Foreign Bureau of the Central Committee of the RSDLP and participated in the Party School in Longjumeau (1911).

At the Sixth (Prague) All-Russia Conference of the RSDLP (1912) Semashko delivered a report on the insurance sector, consisting of a draft resolution which Lenin had edited and which the Conference adopted. In 1913 Semashko participated in the social-democratic movement in Serbia and in Bulgaria; at the beginning of World War I he was interned. Returning to Moscow in September 1917, he was elected chairman of the Bolshevik faction of the Pyatnitskaya district council. He was a delegate of the Sixth Party Congress, participated in the preparation of the armed insurrection in Moscow, and organized medical care for its participants.

== Soviet bureaucrat ==
After the October Revolution of November 1917, Semashko served as head of the Health Department of the Moscow City Council, and from July 1918 to 1930 he held the post of Commissar of Health of the RSFSR. He directed the autopsy on Lenin's corpse. Under Semashko's leadership, work was carried out to combat epidemics, the foundations of Soviet public health were laid, and a system of protection of motherhood and childhood and the health of children and adolescents and a network of medical research institutes were created (e.g. State Central Institute of Public Nutrition in 1930 - now the Scientific Research Institute of Nutrition).

In 1921-1949 Semashko was a professor with the Chair of Social Hygiene in the medical faculty of Moscow State University (from 1931 the Moscow Medical Academy).

== Later life ==
From 1930 to 1936, Semashko worked in the Central Executive Committee, where he served as a member of the Presidium and the chairman of the Commission for the Improvement of Children's Lives (formerly the Detkomissiya), which was entrusted with the fight against homelessness and the management of therapeutic and preventive work in children's health-facilities. In 1945-1949 he was Director of the Institute for School Health of the RSFSR, and at the same time (1947–49) of the Institute for Health and History of Medicine of the Academy of Medical Sciences (since 1965 the Research Institute of the Semashko Social Hygiene and Public Health Organization).

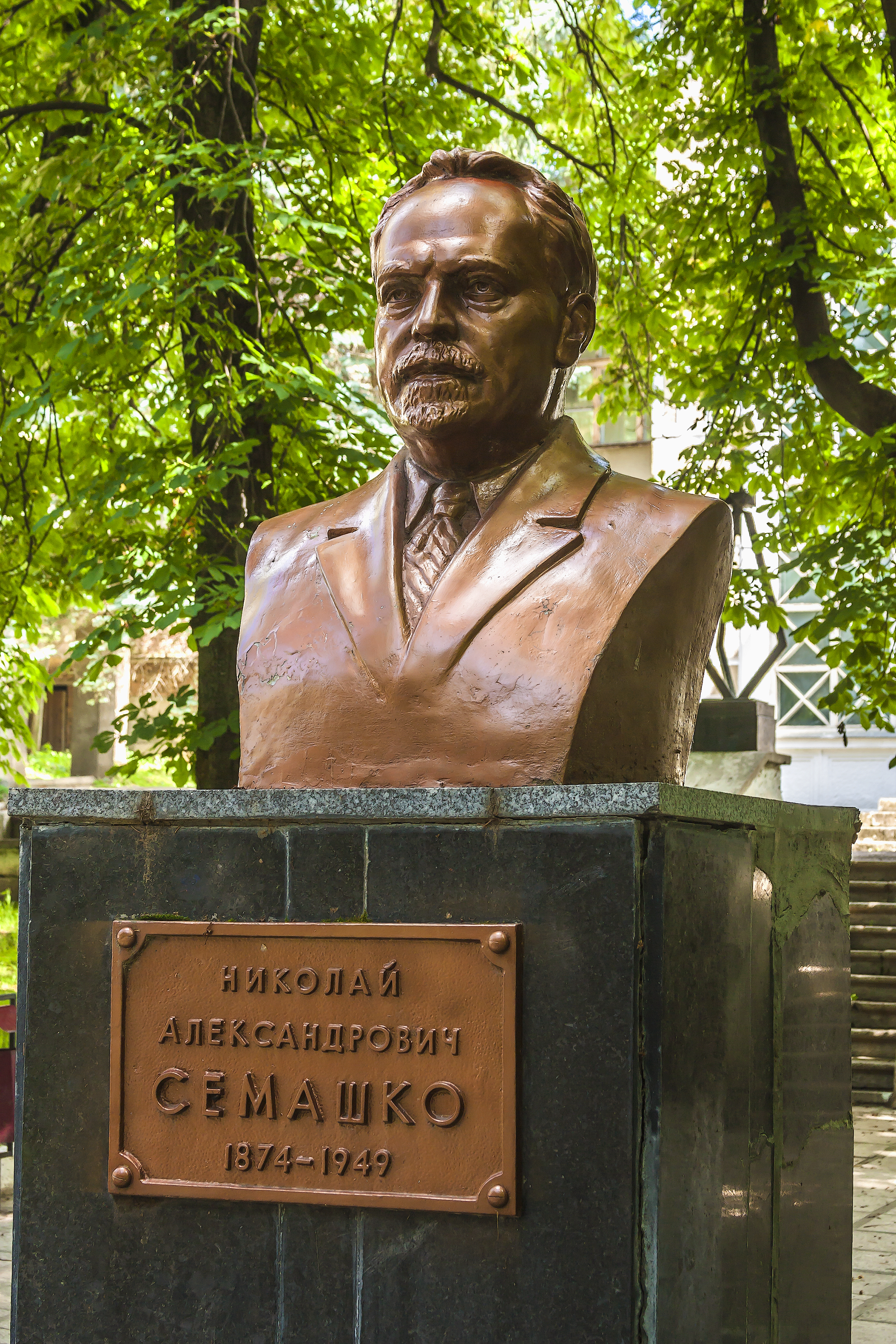
Monument of Semashko in Stavropol Krai

He was a founder of the Central Medical Library (1918) and of the House of Scientists (1922) in Moscow, editor-in-chief of the Great Medical Encyclopedia (1927–1936), the first chairman of the Supreme Council for Physical Education and Sports (from 1923), chairman of the All-Union Hygiene Society (1940–49), and delegate to the 10th, 12th, and 16th Party Congresses. He was awarded the Order of Lenin, the Order of the Red Banner of Labour, and medals.

Semashko was married and had a daughter Helen (Russian: Елена Николаевна Семашко, 1908–1983, married name Farobina), who was for many years a responsible official of the Ministry of Health.

== See also ==
- N. A. Semashko City Hospital No. 1
