= American International Health Alliance =

- Company type: Non-profit organisation
- Founded: 1992
- Headquarters: Washington, DC
- Revenue: 3,283,755 United States dollar (2022)
- Total assets: 3,174,217 United States dollar (2022)
- Website: https://www.aiha.com/

American International Health Alliance (AIHA) is a nonprofit organisation aiming for assisting the global health. The organisation has managed more than 175 partnerships and project across the globe. In 2012, AIHA obtained the support of President's Emergency Plan for AIDS Relief [PEPFAR] project to strengthen the blood service in Central Asia, Ukraine, and Cambodia. Due to its structure based on the programmatic modal and dynamic condition, this organisation is suitable to assist the community or worldwide countries which have limited resources, and it is beneficial for sustainable evolution. AIHA is contributing to improve the worldwide health conditions. This organisation has been associated and largely contributed in the HIV-related area since 2000.

== AIHA History ==
AIHA established in 1992, which provides the healthcare services and supporting professional medical education organisation. The initial purpose is assisting the nations of the former Soviet Union to build a more complete healthcare system. It is the first organisation that forming the cooperative agreements with the countries which are equivalent with US, those countries are Georgia, Kyrgyzstan, Russia, Ukraine, and Uzbekistan. In 1993, this program expanded to more area such as Armenia, Belarus, Kazakhstan, and Turkmenistan, and it dabbled the broader area, including infection control, nursing, women's health and so on. In 2000, to cope with the increasing HIV/AIDS epidemic in some areas, AIHA set up a pilot program to control and prevent the mother-to-child transmission of HIV in those suffered countries. In 2016, AIHA established two biomedical partnerships to enhance the local capability of cadre in Uganda and Kenya. According to the management of the aids intervention plan, this project and new partnership can improve the treatment for the local in Zambia.

== Organisation ==
=== Leadership ===
The AIHA is led by the Mr. Greeley, He succeeded the founder of AIHA James P. Smith since 1992, Greeley has more than 30 years of experience working for international development and nonprofit health organisations, as well as for the pharmaceutical company Merck & Co., Inc. The director concentrated on improving the medication supplies of developed and emerging countries.

=== Funding ===
The funding of AIHA is supported by a unique collaboration between the U.S. government and the private sector. AIHA has constructed 200 partnerships and projects in 34 countries since 2004, it was funded by over $361 million from U.S. Government grants and awards, U.S. twinning partners donated more than $292 million simultaneously. One of the donors is the U.S. President's Emergency Plan for AIDS Relief [PEPFAR] which is the US organisation focus on dealing HIV diseases, it regards the AIHA as the primary implementing partners.

==== Volga River AIDS Alliance ====
The corporation between AIHA and USAID is based on the investment from USAID. This public-private partnership aims to improve prime level care and treatment for those people living with HIV/AIDS in the Samara and Saratov regions of Russia. AIHA focus on the training, monitoring and evaluation parts with the financial support by USAID and AIDS Healthcare Foundation [AHF]. The result is optimistic that the health care of AIDS had been strengthened and the local patients symptom were improved during this corporation.

== The partnership model ==
=== HIV/AIDS Twining Model ===
The partnership model of AIHA are developing among 14 countries such as Africa, Asia, Eurasia, and the Caribbean formed twinning partnerships and they leverage $110 million in US government funds, and US partners contributes $41 million. The organisation seeks the foreign partner and government with positive participation and interesting in investment to ensure to satisfy the specific demand.

==== CSO Initiative ====
Civil society organisations [CSOs] played a key role in planning and implementing every stage of the PEPFAR programme, for advertising the service delivery. Their involvement is essential for the programme's success, sustainability and achieving HIV/AIDS prevention goals.

The goals of the CSO initiative are both expanding the capacity of PEPFAR team to make society participate the successful planning for Country Operational Plans [COP] plan meaningfully and enabling the worldwide PEPFAR team to join in.

AIHA and the National Alliance of State and Territorial AIDS Directors [NASTAD] started up a data use package which spreading up to the worldwide PEPFAR team and a series of techniques support and intervention measure to enhance the more meaningful interaction between national team and CSOs.

===== Accomplishments =====
These organisations represented the professionals with different experiences. Some may be informed in the strategy decisions, others might be not conversant. PEFAR played a role of constructing a simplified framework, to achieve that promoting progress of censorship and present the epidemiology and planned data. As a result, that the CSO workers could analysis and inform the PEPFAR plans.

=== Partnerships of Sarov in Russia ===
The partnership model of AIHA demonstrates that host community should develop the recognition of ownership for both the programs and the methodology in order to have a sustainable outcome. AIHA improved Russian health care plan by sponsoring the programs in a partnership between US and Russian communities since 1992. Due to the deterioration of health condition in Russia since the 1960s, and the fall of Soviet Union caused the failure of supporting health service which resulted with the shortage of medications, decreasing life span and increasing mortality. Russian health system was lack of the clinical practice, centralised management structure, and a compartmentalised specialist-based system.

In 1996, a new partnership between Los Alamos, NM, and its sister city, Sarov, Russia began. AIHA granted the partnership with the goal of boosting the health of children and improving the treatment of chronic diseases in Savor community oriented primary care(COPC), which is summarised to the Los Alamos-Sarov medical partnership.

AIHA implemented the health-care model in accordance with guidelines for asthma and diabetes that evidently resulted in clinic improvements. They began to implement collection of data system to provide the information recycle for detecting the quality of result. The initial activity changed the dangerous behaviour of teenagers, and the paediatric and adult dental health and breastfeeding. These activities could be developed and replicated in other places. The cultural and historical factors influence the Russian health system, the primary step for Sarov is to construct trusting relationship with America.Dividing health service and professional-orientation system may impede the participation of multi-projects and communities. It is hard to describe the local health needs due to the lack of information. AIHA and Sarov had challenged during monitoring and calculating process.

==== Nursing programme ====
With the corporation from USAId in USA, the Orenburg AIDS Centre accepted more Russian traditional nurses who had few experiences in looking after the patients, and they had become more professional. They changed those patients with wrong cognition who claimed that it was no necessary to take medication, because Aids are uncured. Antiretroviral drugs kept the HIV bacteria in a very low level to improve the health and living standards of patients. These positive changes had proved that the nursing is essentially important in improving the quality of health care.

==== Asthma programme ====
One of the project is Asthma Self-Care. 85 adults and 30 paediatric patients with persistent symptom participated a project in 6 months. All had attended the asthma school and showed awareness of diseases and techniques of the self-assistance. The initial feedback reveals that the emergency time had decreased. The program has been expanded to 195 patients.

== Summary of priorities and campaigns ==
AIHA is aiming to consolidate the health system and human resources locally, the vision of this organisation is providing the superior health care for everyone in the world. The mission is to enhance the health systems and workforce capacity worldwide Medical Support by collaborating with local partnership which could prove methods of technical assistance and support.

== Medical Support ==
=== HIV prevention program ===
AIHA started to implement HIV-related prevention programs, awareness strengthening activities, and treatment services in Eastern Europe. The infection rates of some communities had been increased to more than 200% at that time by several years. In 2004, due to the funding support by US President's emergency plan for AIDS Relief, AIHA initiated a new project relating HIV/AIDS, and it shared the unique partnership model and professional knowledge to those countries that need technical assistance and support. AIHA's flagship HIV project is established since 2004, and it utilised the effective and low-cost partnership model by the cooperative agreement of HRSA, the main targeted countries are low-income which have been overloaded by HIV and other health problem. To support the PEPFAR priorities and global 90-90-90 targets, AIHA has constructed more than 55 intervention program in 14 countries under the twinning center. These method provided the in-service training and graduated more than 10,000 people. AIHA arranged 105 professionals in long-term mission in African countries, these professionals contributed more than 23,545 working days that enhancing the healthcare system all around the world.

=== Biomedical Technology Program ===
This program targets to satisfy the demand of current techniques and medical system in each country, especially providing high quality diagnostic, treatment and nursing services for HIV. AIHA established the first Biomedical Technology program in sub-Saharan Africa，with the support of the PEPFAR. AIHA provided the twinning model to Ethiopian partners at Jimma Institute of Technology and US counterpart institutions linked to TegbarId Polytechnic for rapidly training and distributing skilled biomedical technicians and providing consistent in-service training for improving professionals.

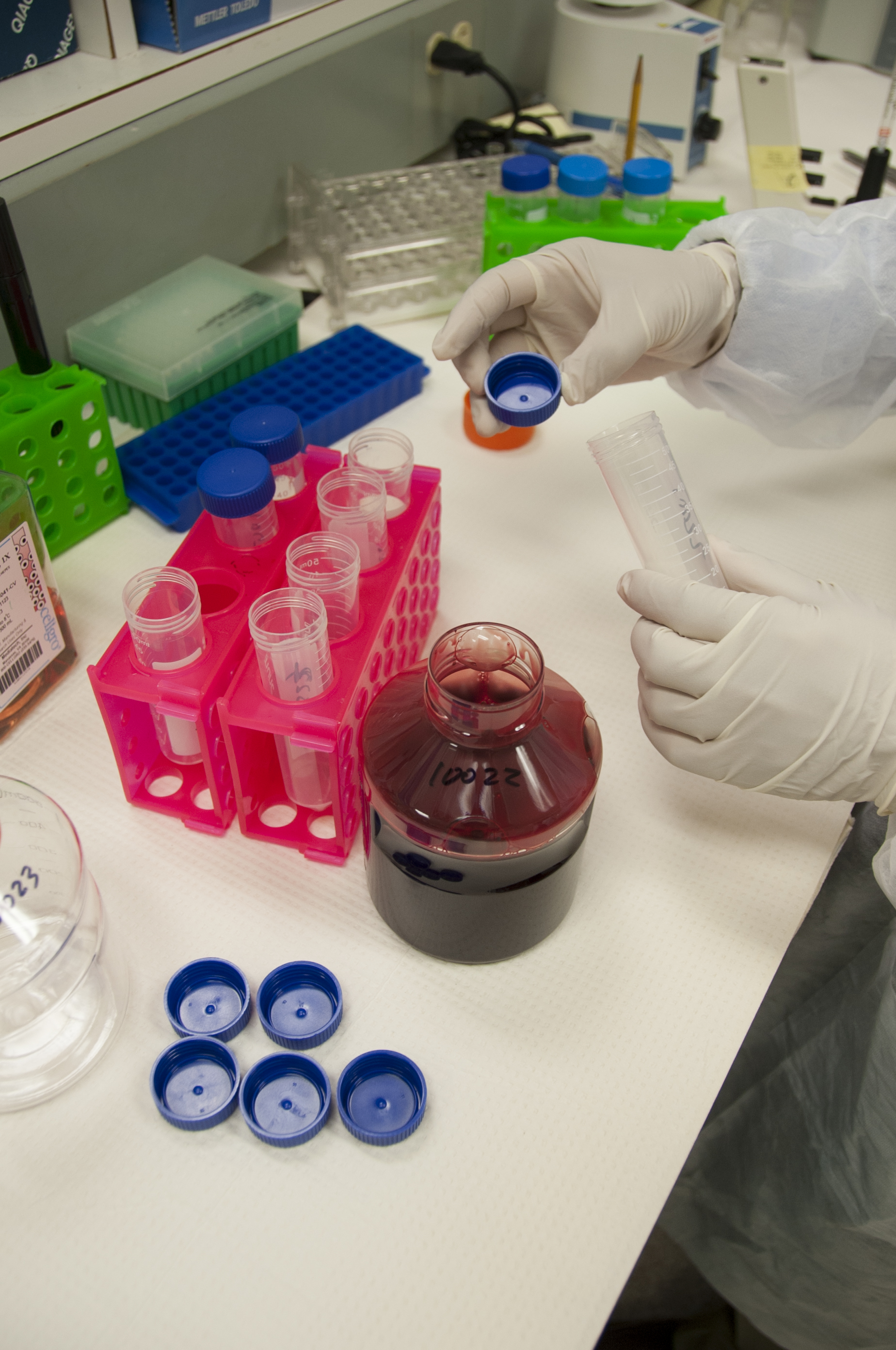
Blood safety experiment

=== Blood safety ===
AIHA supported the consistent between national transfusion centre of health department and professionals of Australian Red Cross. They enhanced the essential infrastructure of blood safety including constituting the national blood policies and transfusion clinic guidelines and the support of laboratory training in capital areas. By training and guidance, tech team improved the clinic practise.

=== Clinical Pharmacy Program ===
The program established the relationship to enhance local institution capability, in response to train the pharmacists and middle level of pharmacy professionals to achieve the domestic health care demand and priority item .

=== Infection Control Program ===
The program provides the technical guidance, clinic training and guidance, and specialist advice, in order to avoid the transmission of the medical infection which used low-cost and simple measure to change the program and behaviour including basic health care. AIHA and partners have been trying to developing healthcare practices and patient outcomes since the establishment of the first hospital-to-hospital partnerships in 1992.

Those countries which AIHA regarded as a primary activity were resulting successfully due to the efforts in accordance with the regulatory changes at both regional and national levels. Russian had published the first infection control project since constructing the hospital, which including the establishment of physician-nurse hospital epidemiology teams to administrate its related policies and methods. Other countries used Russian example to control the domestic infection by integrating the policies and methods.

=== Tuberculosis Program ===
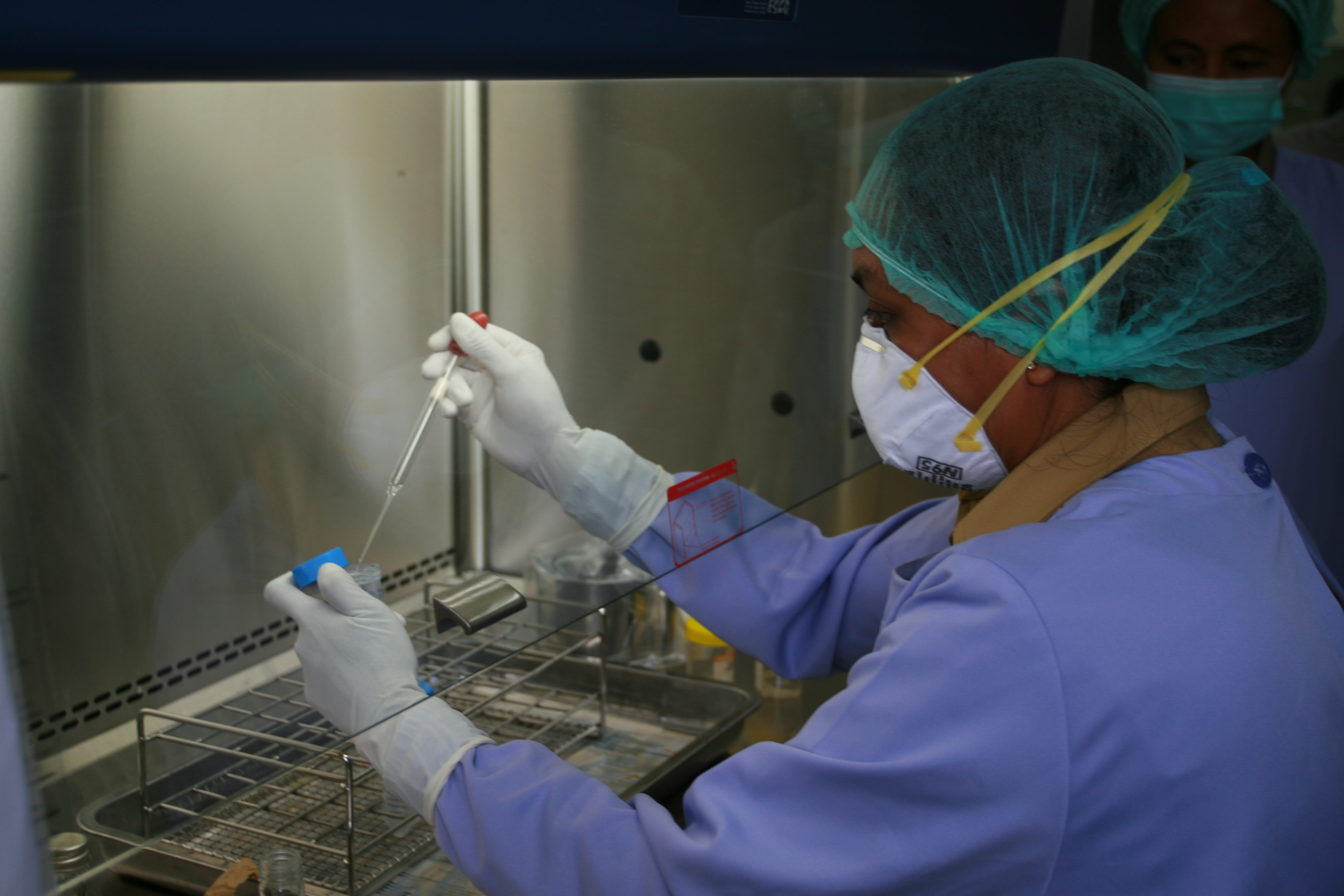
TB laboratory

AIHA's Tuberculosis [TB] and TB-HIV activities assist to build health system capability, and tuberculosis can be prevented and diagnosed effectively. AIHA and SIDA (Swedish International Development Cooperation Agency), USAID (United States Agency for International Development) assisted to implement The National Programme for Tuberculosis Control. AIHA launched the Moldova's national TB laboratory network, remoulding four laboratories, modifying the methods of guideline, and the quality control and feedback programme was framing. The most significant contribution after improving laboratory capability was that the DOTS-Plus for MDR-TB treatment in Moldova approved by WHO's Green Light Committee (February 2005).

=== Maternal & Child Health ===
AIHA Maternal & Child Hearth targeted to construct a more comprehensive, consumer-oriented centre which could enhance health, education of patient, earlier diagnosis and therapy to help those women who are low income and middle income facing health problem and assist them for follow-up healthcare.

==== Background ====
AIHA constructed the sustainable human resources capacity in order to provide consumer-oriented female health and health care. After the collapse of Soviet, the previous women health care was incomplete and separate, around 0.18 billion women faced the challenge of health care, more cancer and sexual violence happened, more than 15,000 women died due to the violence behaviour.

==== Contribution ====
AIHA incorporated with local stakeholders to assist women for the more comprehensive services, including model interference implement, and the built the networks of Women's Wellness Centres [WWCs] among 30 communities in Eurasia. AIHA established the hotlines for those women in Eurasia, as a result of educating young girls about Human trafficking and providing the services and support for victim.

=== Hospital Strengthening Program ===
The subsidiary hospital of AIHA plan established the twining partnership to focus on constructing institutions and human resources capability, in order to respond the local health care demand and senior education priority item.

AIHA has constructed 41 partnerships named hospital-to-hospital among 20 countries. 90 hospitals have been involved by twinning partnerships in the United States and approximately 100 in Africa and Eurasia.

=== AIHA’s Knowledge Management Program ===
This program is promoting the evidence-based practises and using updated application software to make the decisions.
The knowledge management program plan originated from the USAID-supported Learning Resource Centre [LRC] Project since the 1990s.It is aimed to enlarge the use of information and technology techniques to improve the middle and eastern European and Russian health care services.

==== Result ====
AIHA established 140 LRC which is a pivot for the communication centre, at hospital, university, clinic and hygiene department by PubMed, Cochrane library and HINARI online database that provided the interview of clinic resources. AIHA trained coordinator to manage the centre by acknowledging LRC information, and gave response of request and taught other related professionals how to search the evidence-based resources to be the propellent of the evolution.

== See also ==
- President's Emergency Plan for AIDS Relief
- AIDS Healthcare Foundation
