= Philippinite =

Name given to tektites found in the Philippines

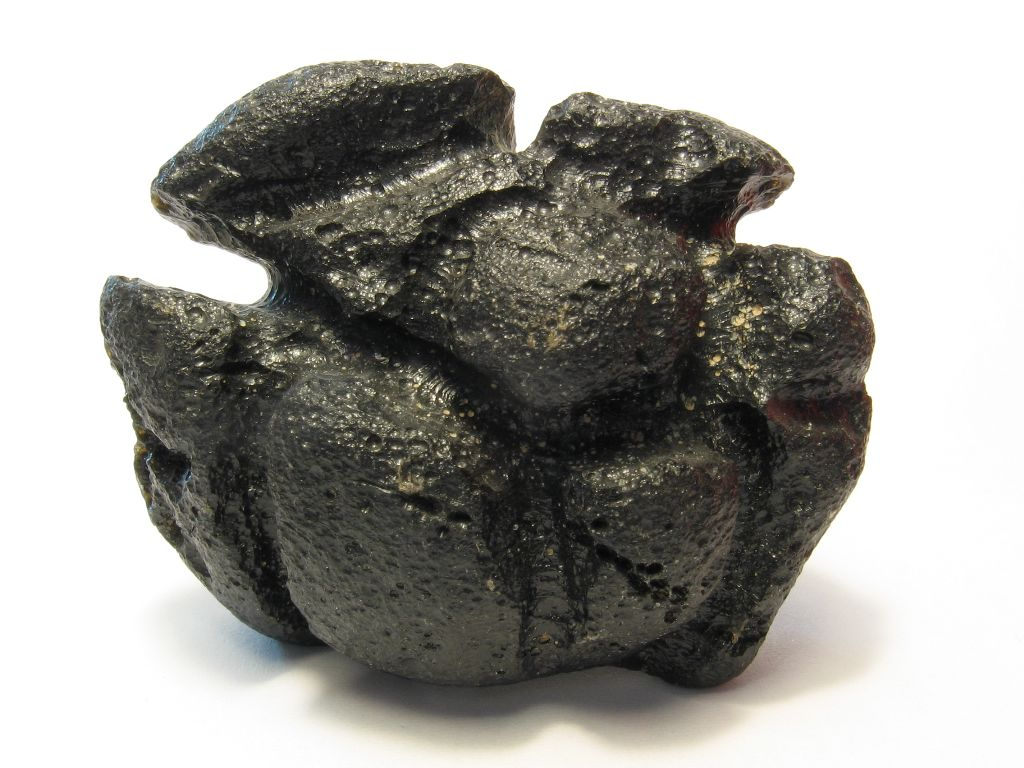
Philippinite from Malaguit, Paracale, Philippines. The specimen weighs 73g and is about 56 mm wide

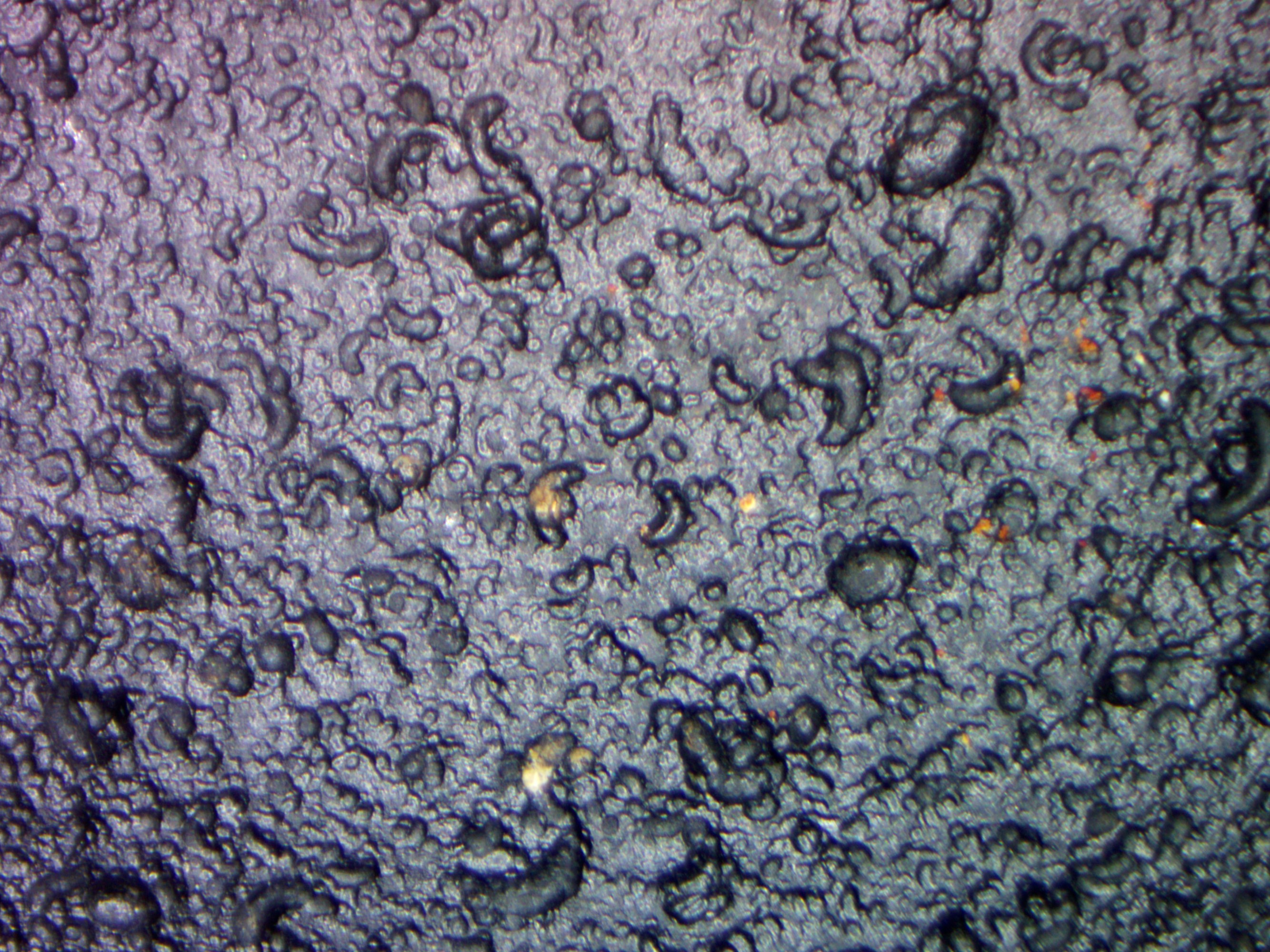
Microscope image of a Philippinite's surface

Philippinites, or rizalites are tektites found in the Philippines. They are considered to be about 710,000 years old on the average and generally ranging in size from millimeters to centimeters. Their age corresponds with the age of other tektites in the Australian strewn tektite field. In 1964, a very large philippinite, weighing 226.3 grams (0.499 pounds) with dimensions 6.5 x 6.2 x 5.2 cm, was purchased by the University of California, Los Angeles Department of Astronomy. The heaviest philippinite ever found weighs 1,281.89 grams (2.8261 pounds) in its splash-form^{[Note 1]}, which is also the heaviest tektite of this kind.

== Etymology ==
The term rizalite was named after the Philippine province of Rizal where the first black tektites were rediscovered in October 1926 at Novaliches (which was then part of Rizal). Although, it was only in 1928 that the term was proposed by American anthropologist H. Otley Beyer, dubbed as the father of Philippine tektite studies, to refer to tektites found in the Philippines. Philippinite has become the more favored term because other tektites were found in other areas of the Philippines such as the Bicol region and the town of Anda in the province of Pangasinan. Some early authors referred to Philippine tektites as "obsidianites" but that too has fallen out of use due to the introduction of the term philippinite by succeeding authors.

== Uses ==
In ancient Philippines, tektites were used by early settlers in the Philippines as arrowheads and other tools as well as decorative purposes. During the Philippine Iron Age, due to the polish features of philippinites found in graves, it was evidenced that philippinites were used as amulets or charms. In modern times, it is generally used as a collector's item.

== Composition ==
The following table details the chemical composition of philippinite:

Oxides	Content (in weight percentage)	Number of determinations
SiO_{2}	70.66-71.64	4
TiO_{2}	0.63-1.04	4
Al_{2}O_{3}	12.08-13.52	4
Fe_{2}O_{3}	0.59-2.03	3
FeO	3.03-5.32	4
MnO	0.08-0.16	4
CaO	2.95-3.42	4
MgO	2.23-3.65	4
Na_{2}O	1.21-1.66	4
K_{2}O	1.69-2.28	4
H_{2}O^{+}	0.15-0.63	4
H_{2}O^{−}	Traces	1
P_{2}O_{5}	0.10-0.18	3

== Notes ==
1. ^{1} Splash-form tektites are tektites that are shaped like spheres, ellipsoids, teardrops, dumbbells, and other forms. They have shaped this way due to the ejecta or splash of silicate liquid following a meteorite impact, scattering them to a distance up to thousands of kilometers.
