= Banwari Lal =

Banwari Lal may refer to:

- Banwari Lal (revolutionary), Indian revolutionary
- Banwari Lal (biotechnologist) (born 1960), Indian biotechnologist
- Banwari Lal Joshi, Indian civil servant and former Governor of the Indian state of Uttar Pradesh
- Banwarilal Purohit (born 1940), Indian politician from Rajasthan
- Banwari Lal Agrawal, Indian politician from Chhattisgarh
- Banwari Lal Sharma, Indian politician from Madhya Pradesh
- Banwari Lal Hansaria, former judge of the Supreme Court of India
- Banwari Lal Chouksey, Indian machinist and inventor
- Banwari Lal (Haryana politician), Indian politician from Haryana
