= Paleolightning =

Remnants of ancient lightning activity

Paleolightning refers to the remnants of ancient lightning activity studied in fields such as historical geology, geoarchaeology, and fulminology. Paleolightning provides tangible evidence for the study of lightning activity in Earth's past and the roles lightning may have played in Earth's history. Some studies have speculated that lightning activity played a crucial role in the development of not only Earth's early atmosphere but also early life. Lightning, a non-biological process, has been found to produce biologically useful material through the oxidation and reduction of inorganic matter. Research on the impact of lightning on Earth's atmosphere continues today, especially with regard to feedback mechanisms of lightning-produced nitrate compounds on atmospheric composition and global average temperatures.

Detecting lightning activity in the geologic record can be difficult, given the instantaneous nature of lightning strikes in general. However, fulgurite, a glassy tube-like, crust-like, or irregular mineraloid that forms when lightning fuses soil, quartz sands, clay, rock, biomass, or caliche is prevalent in electrically active regions around the globe and provides evidence of not only past lightning activity, but also patterns of convection. Since lightning channels carry an electric current to the ground, lightning can produce magnetic fields as well. While lightning-magnetic anomalies can provide evidence of lightning activity in a region, these anomalies are often problematic for those examining the magnetic record of rock types because they disguise the natural magnetic fields present.

== Lightning and early Earth ==
The atmospheric composition of early Earth (the first billion years) was drastically different from its current state. Initially, hydrogen and helium compounds dominated the atmosphere. However, given the relatively small size of these elements and the warmer temperature of Earth compared to other planets at the time, most of these lighter compounds escaped, leaving behind an atmosphere composed mainly of methane, nitrogen, oxygen and ammonia with small concentrations of hydrogen compounds and other gases. The atmosphere was transitioning from a reduction atmosphere (an atmosphere that inhibits oxidation) to one of oxidation, similar to our current atmosphere. The origin of life on Earth has been a matter of speculation for quite some time. Living things did not spontaneously appear, so some sort of biological or even non-biological process must have been responsible for the generation of life. Lightning is a non-biological process, and many have speculated that lightning was present on early Earth. One of the most famous studies that investigated lightning on the early Earth was the Miller–Urey experiment.

=== Miller–Urey experiment ===
Schematic diagram of the Miller–Urey experiment

The Miller–Urey experiment sought to recreate the early Earth atmosphere within a laboratory setting to determine the chemical processes that ultimately led to life on Earth. The basis of this experiment was leveraged on Oparin's hypothesis, which assumed that some organic matter could be created from inorganic material given a reduction atmosphere. Using a mixture of water, methane, ammonia, and hydrogen in glass tubes, Miller and Urey replicated the effects of lightning on the mixture using electrodes. At the conclusion of the experiment, as much as 15 percent of the carbon from the mixture formed organic compounds, while 2 percent of the carbon formed amino acids, a necessary element for the building blocks of living organisms.

=== Volcanic lightning on early Earth ===
The actual composition of the atmosphere of the early Earth is an area of great debate. Varying amounts of certain gaseous constituents can greatly impact the overall effect of a particular process, which includes non-biological processes such as the buildup of charge in thunderstorms. It has been argued that volcano-induced lightning in the early stages of Earth's existence, because the volcanic plume was composed of additional "reducing gases", was more effective at stimulating the oxidation of organic material to accelerate the production of life. In the case of volcanic lightning, the lightning discharge almost exclusively occurs directly within the volcanic plume. Since this process occurs fairly close to ground level, it has been suggested that volcanic lightning contributed to the generation of life to a greater extent than lightning produced within clouds that would lower positive or negative charge from a cloud to the ground. Hill (1992) quantified this enhanced contribution by examining estimated hydrogen cyanide (HCN) concentrations from volcanic lightning and "general lightning". Results showed that HCN concentrations for volcanic lightning were an order of magnitude larger than "general lightning". Hydrogen cyanide is yet another compound that has been linked to the generation of life on Earth. However, given that the intensity and amount of volcanic activity during the early stages of Earth's development is not fully understood, hypotheses regarding past volcanic activity (e.g., Hill, 1992) are usually based on present-day observed volcanic activity.

== Nitrogen fixation and lightning ==
Nitrogen, the most abundant gas in our atmosphere, is crucial for life and a key component to various biological processes. Biologically usable forms of nitrogen, such as nitrates and ammonia, arise via biological and non-biological processes through nitrogen fixation. One example of a non-biological process responsible for nitrogen fixation is lightning.

Lightning strikes are short-lived, high-intensity electrical discharges that can reach temperatures five times hotter than the surface of the Sun. As a result, as a lightning channel travels through the air, ionization occurs, forming nitrogen-oxide (NO_{x}) compounds within the lightning channel. Global NO_{x} production as a result of lightning is around 1–20 Tg N yr^{−1}. Some studies have implied that lightning activity may be the "greatest contributor to the global nitrogen budget", even larger than the burning of fossil fuels. With anywhere between 1500 and 2000 thunderstorms and millions of lightning strikes occurring daily around the Earth, it is understandable that lightning activity plays a vital role in nitrogen fixation. While nitrogen oxide compounds are produced as a lightning channel travels toward the ground, some of those compounds are transferred to the geosphere via wet or dry deposition. Variations of nitrogen in terrestrial and oceanic environments impact primary production and other biological processes. Changes in primary production can impact not only the carbon cycle, but also the climate system.

=== The lightning-biota climatic feedback ===
The lightning-biota climatic feedback (LBF) is a negative feedback response to global warming on a time scale of hundreds or thousands of years, as a result of increased concentrations of nitrogen compounds from lightning activity deposited into biological ecosystems. A zero-dimension Earth conceptual model, which took into account global temperature, soil available nitrogen, terrestrial vegetation, and global atmospheric carbon dioxide concentration, was used to determine the response of global average temperatures to increased NO_{x} concentrations from lightning strikes. It was hypothesized that as a result of increasing global average temperatures, lightning production would increase because increased evaporation from oceans would promote enhanced convection. As a result of more numerous lightning strikes, nitrogen fixation would deposit more biologically useful forms of nitrogen into various ecosystems, encouraging primary production. Impacts on primary production would affect the carbon cycle, leading to a reduction in atmospheric carbon dioxide. A reduction in atmospheric carbon dioxide would result in a negative feedback, or cooling, of the climate system. Model results indicated that, for the most part, the lightning-biota climatic feedback retarded positive perturbations in atmospheric carbon dioxide and temperature back to an "equilibrium" state. Impacts of the lightning-biota climatic feedback on curbing anthropogenic influences on atmospheric carbon dioxide concentrations were investigated as well. Using current levels of atmospheric carbon dioxide and rates of increase of atmospheric carbon dioxide on a yearly basis based on the time of the article, the lightning-biota climatic feedback once again showed a cooling effect on global average temperatures, given an initial perturbation. Given the simplified nature of the model, several parameters (ozone produced by lightning, etc.) and other feedback mechanisms were neglected, so the significance of the results is still an area of discussion.

== Lightning in the geologic record ==
Indicators of lightning activity in the geologic record are often difficult to decipher. For example, fossil charcoals from the Late Triassic could potentially be the result of lightning-induced wildfires. Even though lightning strikes are, for the most part, instantaneous events, evidence of lightning activity can be found in objects called fulgurites.

=== Fulgurites ===
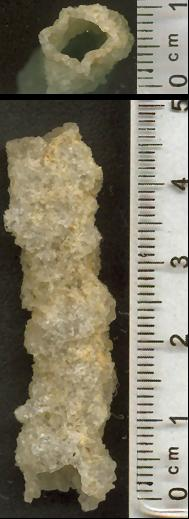
Fulgurite sample (photograph from Mario Hendriks (2006)), illustrating its characteristic glassy, tube-like structure

Fulgurites (from the Latin fulgur, meaning "lightning") are natural tubes, clumps, or masses of sintered, vitrified, and/or fused soil, sand, rock, organic debris and other sediments that sometimes form when lightning discharges into ground. Fulgurites are classified as a variety of the mineraloid lechatelierite. Fulgurites have no fixed composition because their chemical composition is determined by the physical and chemical properties of material struck by lightning. When lightning strikes a grounding substrate, upwards of 100 million volts (100 MV) are rapidly discharged into the ground. This charge propagates into and rapidly vaporizes and melts silica-rich quartzose sand, mixed soil, clay, or other sediments. This results in the formation of hollow and/or branching assemblages of glassy, protocrystalline, and heterogeneously microcrystalline tubes, crusts, slags, and vesicular masses. Fulgurites are homologous to Lichtenberg figures, which are the branching patterns produced on surfaces of insulators during dielectric breakdown by high-voltage discharges, such as lightning.

Fulgurites are indicative of thunderstorms; the distribution of fulgurites can hint at patterns of lightning strikes. Sponholz et al. (1993) studied fulgurite distributions along a north–south cross section in the south central Saharan Desert (Niger). The study found that newer fulgurite concentrations increased from north to south, which indicated not only a paleo-monsoon pattern, but also the demarcation for thunderstorms as they progressed from a northern line to a southern location over time. By examining the outcrops in which the fulgurite samples were found, Sponholz et al. (1993) could provide a relative date for the minerals. The fulgurite samples dated back approximately 15,000 years to the mid to upper Holocene. This finding was in agreement with the paleosols of the region, as this period of the Holocene was particularly wet. A wetter climate would suggest that the propensity for thunderstorms was probably elevated, which would result in larger concentrations of fulgurite. These results pointed to the fact that the climate with which the fulgurite was formed was significantly different from the present climate because the current climate of the Saharan Desert is arid. The approximate age of the fulgurite was determined using thermoluminescence (TL). Quartz sands can be used to measure the amount of radiation exposure, so if the temperature at which the fulgurite was formed is known, one could determine the relative age of the mineral by examining the doses of radiation involved in the process.

Fulgurites also contain air bubbles. Given that the formation of fulgurite generally takes only about one second, and the process involved in the creation of fulgurite involves several chemical reactions, it is relatively easy to trap gases, such as CO_{2}, within the vesicles. These gases can be trapped for millions of years. Studies have shown that the gases within these bubbles can indicate the soil characteristics during the formation of the fulgurite material, which hint at the paleoclimate. Since fulgurite is almost entirely composed of silica with trace amounts of calcium and magnesium, an approximation of the total amount of organic carbon associated with that lightning strike can be made to calculate a carbon-to-nitrogen ratio to determine the paleoenvironment.

=== Paleomagnetism ===
When geologists study paleoclimate, an important factor to examine is the magnetic field characteristics of rock types to determine not only deviations of Earth's past magnetic field, but also to study possible tectonic activity that might suggest certain climate regimes.

Evidence of lightning activity can often be found in the paleomagnetic record. Lightning strikes are the result of tremendous charge buildup in clouds. This excess charge is transferred to the ground via lightning channels, which carry a strong electric current. Because of the intensity of this electric current, when lightning hits the ground, it can produce a strong, albeit brief, magnetic field. Thus, as the electric current travels through soils, rocks, plant roots, etc., it locks a unique magnetic signature within these materials through a process known as lightning-induced remanent magnetization (LIRM). Evidence of LIRM is manifested in concentric magnetic field lines surrounding the location of the lightning strike point. LIRM anomalies normally occur close to the location of the lightning strike, usually encapsulated within several meters of the point of contact. The anomalies are generally linear or radial, which, just like actual lightning channels, branch out from a central point. It is possible to determine the intensity of the electric current from a lightning strike by examining the LIRM signatures. Since rocks and soils already have some preexisting magnetic field, the intensity of the electric current can be determined by examining the change between the "natural" magnetic field and the magnetic field induced by the lightning current, which generally acts parallel to the direction of the lightning channel. Another characteristic feature of an LIRM anomaly compared to other magnetic anomalies is that the electric current intensity is generally stronger. However, some have suggested that the anomalies, like other characteristics in the geologic record, might fade over time as the magnetic field redistributes.

LIRM anomalies can often be problematic when examining the magnetic characteristics of rock types. LIRM anomalies can disguise the natural remanent magnetization (NRM) of the rocks in question because the subsequent magnetization caused by the lightning strike reconfigures the magnetic record. While investigating the soil attributes at the 30-30 Winchester archeological site in northeastern Wyoming to discern the daily activities of prehistoric people that had once occupied that region, David Maki noticed peculiar anomalies in the magnetic record that did not match the circular magnetic remnant features of the ovens used by these prehistoric groups for cooking and pottery. The LIRM anomaly was significantly bigger than the other magnetic anomalies and formed a dendritic structure. To test the validity of the assertion that the magnetic anomaly was indeed the result of lightning and not another process, Maki (2005) tested the soil samples against known standards indicative of LIRM anomalies developed by Dunlop et al. (1984), Wasilewski and Kletetschka (1999), and Verrier and Rochette (2002). These standards include, but are not limited to: 1) Average REM (ratio between natural remanent magnetization to a laboratory standard value) greater than 0.2, and 2) Average Koenigsberger ratio (ratio between natural remanent magnetization and the natural field created by Earth's magnetic field). The findings indicated the evidence of LIRM at the archaeological site. LIRM anomalies also complicated the determination of the relative location of the poles during the late Cretaceous from the magnetic field record of basaltic lava flows in Mongolia. The presence of LIRM-affected rocks was determined when calculated Koenigsberger ratios were drastically higher than other magnetic signatures in the region.
