= Junapani =

Junapani may refer to:

- Junapani (census code 482243), a village in Berasia tehsil, Bhopal district, Madhya Pradesh, India; located near Ganga Pipaliya and Maholi.
- Junapani (census code 482215), a village in Berasia tehsil, Bhopal district, Madhya Pradesh, India; located near Bhojapura, off the Guna-Bhopal road.
