= Ozokerite =

Mineral wax

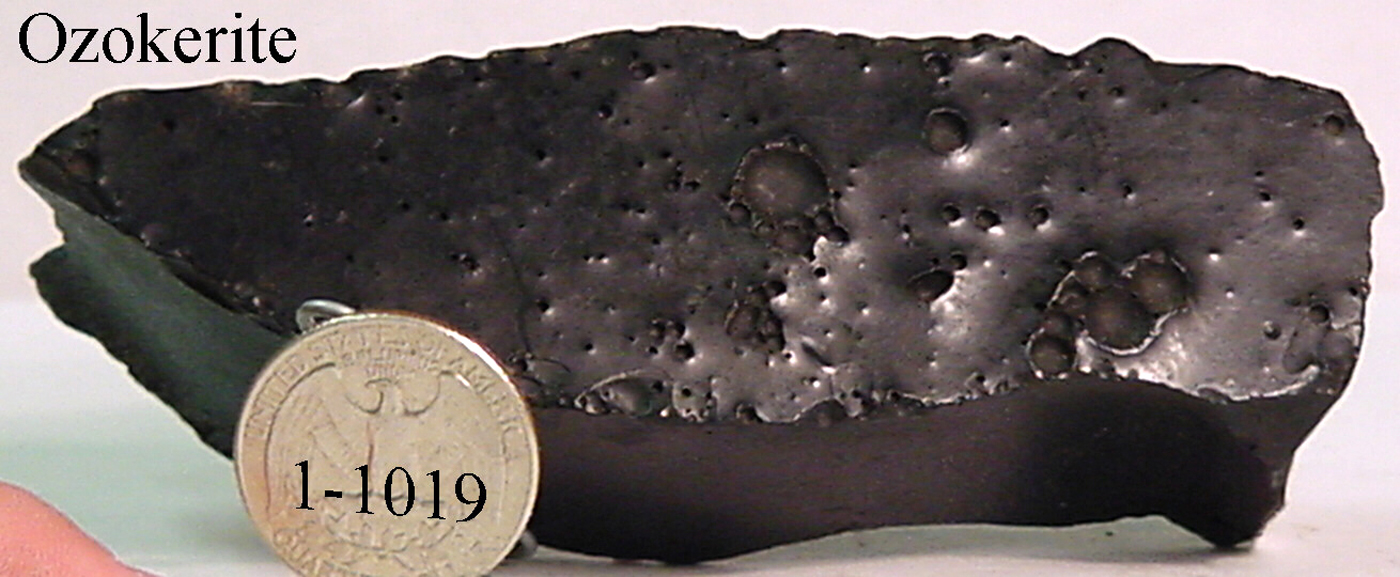

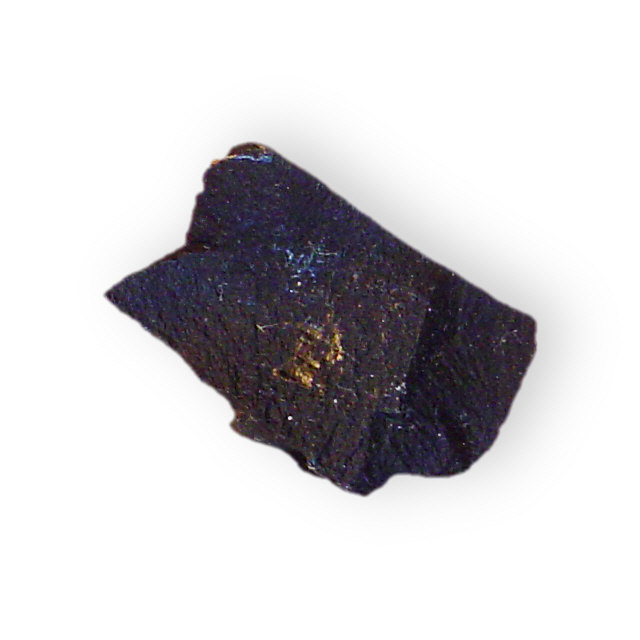
Ozokerite, Wasatch County, Utah

Ozokerite, or ozocerite, archaically referred to as earthwax or earth wax, is a naturally occurring odoriferous mineral wax, or paraffin, found in many localities. Lacking a definite composition and crystalline structure, it is not considered a mineral but only a mineraloid. The name was coined from Greek elements Όζω ozο, to stink, and κηρός keros, wax.

== Sources ==
Specimens have been obtained from Scotland, Northumberland, and Wales, as well as from about thirty countries. Of these occurrences the ozokerite of the island (now peninsula) of Cheleken, near Türkmenbaşy Bay, parts of the Himalayas in India and the deposits of Utah in the United States deserve mention, though the latter have been largely worked out. The sole sources of commercial supply are in Galicia, at Boryslav, Dzwiniacz and Starunia, though the mineraloid is found at other points on both flanks of the Carpathians.

Ozokerite deposits are believed to have originated in much the same way as mineral veins, the slow evaporation and oxidation of petroleum having resulted in the deposition of its dissolved paraffin in the fissures and crevices previously occupied by the liquid. As found native, ozokerite varies from a very soft wax to a black mass as hard as gypsum.

== Properties ==
Its relative density ranges from 0.85 to 0.95, and its melting point from 58 to 100 °C (136 to 212 °F). It is soluble in ether, petroleum, benzene, turpentine, chloroform, carbon disulfide and others. Galician ozokerite varies in color from light yellow to dark brown, and frequently appears green owing to dichroism. It usually melts at 62 °C (144 °F). Chemically, ozokerite consists of a mixture of various hydrocarbons, containing 85–87% by weight of carbon and 14.3% of hydrogen.

== Mining ==
The mining of ozokerite began in Galicia in the 1880s, and was formerly carried on by means of hand-labor, but in the ozokerite mines owned by the Boryslaw Actien Gesellschaft and the Galizische Kreditbank, the workings of which extend to a depth of 200 metres (660 ft), and 225 metres (738 ft), respectively, electrical power is employed for hauling, pumping and ventilating. In these mines there are the usual main shafts and galleries, the ozokerite being reached by levels driven along the strike of the deposit. The wax, as it reaches the surface, varies in purity, and, in new workings especially, only hand-picking is needed to separate the pure material. In other cases much earthy matter is mixed with the material, and then the rock or shale having been eliminated by hand-picking, the "wax-stone" is boiled with water in large coppers, when the pure wax rises to the surface. This is again melted without water, and the impurities are skimmed off, the material being then run into slightly conical cylindrical moulds, and thus made into blocks for the market. The crude ozokerite is refined by treatment first with sulfuric acid, and subsequently with charcoal, when the ceresine or cerasin of commerce is obtained. The refined ozokerite or ceresine, which usually has a melting-point of 61 to 78 °C (142 to 172 °F), is largely used as an adulterant of beeswax, and is frequently colored artificially to resemble that product in appearance.

On distillation in a current of superheated steam, ozokerite yields a candle-making material resembling the paraffin obtained from petroleum and shale-oil but of higher melting-point, and therefore of greater value if the candles made from it are to be used in hot climates. There are also obtained in the distillation light oils and a product resembling vaseline. The residue in the stills consists of a hard, black, waxy substance, which in admixture with India-rubber was employed under the name of okonite as an electrical insulator. From the residue a form of the material known as heel-ball, used to impart a polished surface to the heels and soles of boots, was also manufactured.

Mining of ozokerite diminished after 1940 due to competition from paraffins manufactured from petroleum. It has a higher melting point than most petroleum waxes, and is favored for some applications, such as electrical insulators and candles.

== See also ==
- Zietrisikite
