= Hypatia (stone) =

Candidate for the first comet nucleus

Hypatia is a small stone found in Egypt in 1996. It has been claimed to be both a meteorite and kimberlite debris. It has also been claimed to be the first known specimen of a comet nucleus on Earth, although defying physically-accepted models for hypervelocity processing of organic material. As of November 2023, Hypatia has not been officially classified as a meteorite in the Meteoritical Bulletin, which is tasked with recording all scientifically proven meteorites.

== Discovery and name ==
Hypatia was discovered in December 1996 by Aly A. Barakat at 25°20′N 25°30′E, directly in proximity to a dark, slag-like glassy material that was interpreted to be a form of Libyan desert glass.

Hypatia's status as an extraterrestrial rock is widely accepted. The original sample was cut apart and sent to multiple labs for study, reducing its original size of approximately 30 grams to about four grams.

The rock was named after Hypatia of Alexandria (c. 350–370 AD – 415 AD) – the philosopher, astronomer, mathematician, and inventor. Assuming the Hypatia stone is a meteorite, such naming is in violation of the long-standing convention and regulation of naming meteorites, which states that "a new meteorite shall be named after a geographical locality near to the location of its initial recovery".

== Research ==
Tests done in South Africa by researchers Jan Kramers and Georgy Belyanin of the University of Johannesburg show that Hypatia contains microscopic diamonds. Due to the presence of several anomalous isotopic distributions unknown in prior association, some claim the Hypatia material is necessarily of extraterrestrial origin, although significant terrestrial contamination is dismissed by proponents as being impact-authigenic from incorporation of terrestrial atmosphere, the physics of which are unresolved. Further speculation from comparative summary statistical associations support that Hypatia is a relict fragment of the hypothetical impacting body assumed to have produced the chemically-dissimilar Libyan desert glass. If the claimed association holds, Hypatia may have impacted Earth approximately 28 million years ago. Its unusual chemistry has prompted further speculation that Hypatia may predate the formation of the Solar System.

In 2018 Georgy Belyanin, Jan Kramers, and colleagues found compounds including polyaromatic hydrocarbons and silicon carbide associated with a previously-unknown nickel phosphide compound. Other observations supporting non-terrestrial origin for the Hypatia samples include ratios of silicon to carbon anti-correlated to terrestrial averages, or those of major planets like Mars or Venus. Some samples of interstellar dust overlap Hypatia distributions, although Hypatia's elemental chemistry also overlaps some terrestrial distributions.

In 2022, Kramers and Andreoli proposed the hypothesis that the Hypatia stone represents the first evidence on Earth of a type Ia supernova explosion.

As of November 2023, Jan Kramers appears to have been a co-author in all the scientific publications made on the Hypatia stone. No independent scientific studies have been conducted, either proving or disproving the claims in the above papers, starting from the extraterrestrial origin.

== See also ==
- Carbonado – Impure form of polycrystalline diamond
- Fulgurite – Rock type formed by lightning strike
- Impactite – Rock created or modified by impact of a meteorite
- Libyan desert glass – Desert glass found in Libya and Egypt
- Nova remnant – Cosmic matter (remnant)
