= Mineraloid =

Non-crystalline mineral-like substance

A mineraloid is a naturally occurring substance that resembles a mineral, but does not demonstrate the crystallinity of a mineral. Mineraloid substances possess chemical compositions that vary beyond the generally accepted ranges for specific minerals, for example, obsidian is an amorphous glass and not a true crystal; lignite (jet) is derived from the decay of wood under extreme pressure underground; and opal is a mineraloid substance because of its non-crystalline nature. Pearl is a mineraloid substance because the calcite crystals and the aragonite crystals are bonded by an organic material, and naturally occurs without definite proportions of the components.

The first usage of the term mineraloid substance was in 1909, by mineralogist and geologist Julian Niedzwiedzki, in identifying and describing amorphous substances that resemble minerals.

== Examples ==
- Allophane, solid (IMA/CNMNC valid mineral name)
- Amber, non-crystalline structure, organic
- Anthracite or hard coal
- Bituminous coal
- Chlorophaeite
- Chrysocolla, solid (IMA/CNMNC valid mineral name)
- Deweylite, a mixture of serpentine and talc or stevensite
- Diatomite
- Ebonite, vulcanized natural or synthetic rubber (organic); lacks a crystalline structure
- Fulgurite, a variety of the mineraloid lechatelierite
- Jet, non-crystalline nature, organic (very compact coal)
- Lechatelierite, nearly pure silica glass, solid (IMA/CNMNC valid mineral name)
- Leonardite
- Libyan desert glass
- Lignite—brown coal
- Limonite, a mixture of oxides and hydroxides of iron
- Mercury, (as liquid)
- Moldavite
- Mookaite/Radiolarite
- Obsidian—volcanic glass; non-crystalline structure, a silica rich glass
- Opal, non-crystalline hydrated silica silicon dioxide, solid (IMA/CNMNC valid mineral name)
- Ozokerite, a black waxy hydrocarbon mixture
- Palagonite
- Pearl, organically produced carbonate
- Pele's hair
- Petroleum, liquid, organic
- Psilomelane
- Pumice, not counting those that are highly porphyritic such as from Mt. Pinatubo or those that have a high microlite content
- Pyrobitumen, amorphous fossilized petroleum (noncrystalline, organic)
- Shungite, black, lustrous, more than 98 weight percent of carbon
- Sideromelane, volcanic glass – non-crystalline, an iron rich, silica poor glass
- Tektite, meteoritic silica rich glass
- Water, e.g. as inclusions in other crystals, or in the form of rain, (as liquid)
- Zietrisikite, a mineral hydrocarbon wax

== See also ==
- List of minerals – Mineraloids are listed after minerals in each alphabetically sorted section.
