= Junapani (census code 482243) =

- village
- Location within Madhya Pradesh Location within India
- Coordinates: 23.517561°N 77.299693°E
- Country: India
- State: Madhya Pradesh
- District: Bhopal
- Tehsil: Berasia

Population (2011)
  - Total: 1,297
- Time zone: UTC+5:30 (IST)
- ISO 3166 code: MP-IN
- 2011 census code: 482243

Junapani is a village in the Bhopal district of Madhya Pradesh, India. It is located in the Berasia tehsil. It is located near Ganga Pipaliya and Maholi.

== Demographics ==
According to the 2011 census of India, Junapani has 237 households. The effective literacy rate (i.e. the literacy rate of population excluding children aged 6 and below) is 63.26%.

Demographics (2011 Census)
	Total	Male	Female
Population	1297	687	610
Children aged below 6 years	211	118	93
Scheduled caste	440	236	204
Scheduled tribe	0	0	0
Literates	687	407	280
Workers (all)	613	331	282
Main workers (total)	336	294	42
Main workers: Cultivators	204	173	31
Main workers: Agricultural labourers	130	119	11
Main workers: Household industry workers	0	0	0
Main workers: Other	2	2	0
Marginal workers (total)	277	37	240
Marginal workers: Cultivators	2	1	1
Marginal workers: Agricultural labourers	273	34	239
Marginal workers: Household industry workers	0	0	0
Marginal workers: Others	2	2	0
Non-workers	684	356	328
