= Eman Ghoneim =

Egyptian-American geomorphologist

- إيمان غنيم
- Born: Egypt
- Education: Tanta University (B.S., M.S. 1997); University of Southampton (Ph.D. 2002)
- Notable work: Discovery of the Ahramat Ancient Nile Branch (2024), discovery of the Kebira Crater (2006)
- Scientific career
- Fields: Satellite imagery, radar, GIS, paleo-channels, flash flood hazard modeling

Eman Ghoneim (Arabic: إيمان غنيم) is an Egyptian-American geomorphologist. In March 2006, Dr. Ghoneim, together with Farouk El-Baz, discovered the Kebira Crater, a possible impact crater in the Sahara. In 2007, while processing microwave space data, Ghoneim discovered an ancient mega-lake (30,750 km^{2}) buried beneath the sand of the Great Sahara in Northern Darfur, Sudan. In May 2024, using radar remote sensing, Ghoneim and her team discovered a long-lost ancient branch of the Nile River, dubbed the Ahramat (Arabic for pyramids), given its close proximity to the largest concentration of pyramids in Egypt. Ghoneim's findings suggest that this branch was suitably sized to act as a transportation waterway for workmen and building materials to the pyramids’ sites. The discovered Ahramat Branch likely played a vital role in the pyramids’ construction.

== Flash floods ==
Eman Ghoneim's work focuses on analyzing the topography of areas that are at high risk of flash flooding. She analyzes the hydrological and meteorological factors of these areas. This allows her to bring new ideas of safety into less educated populations.

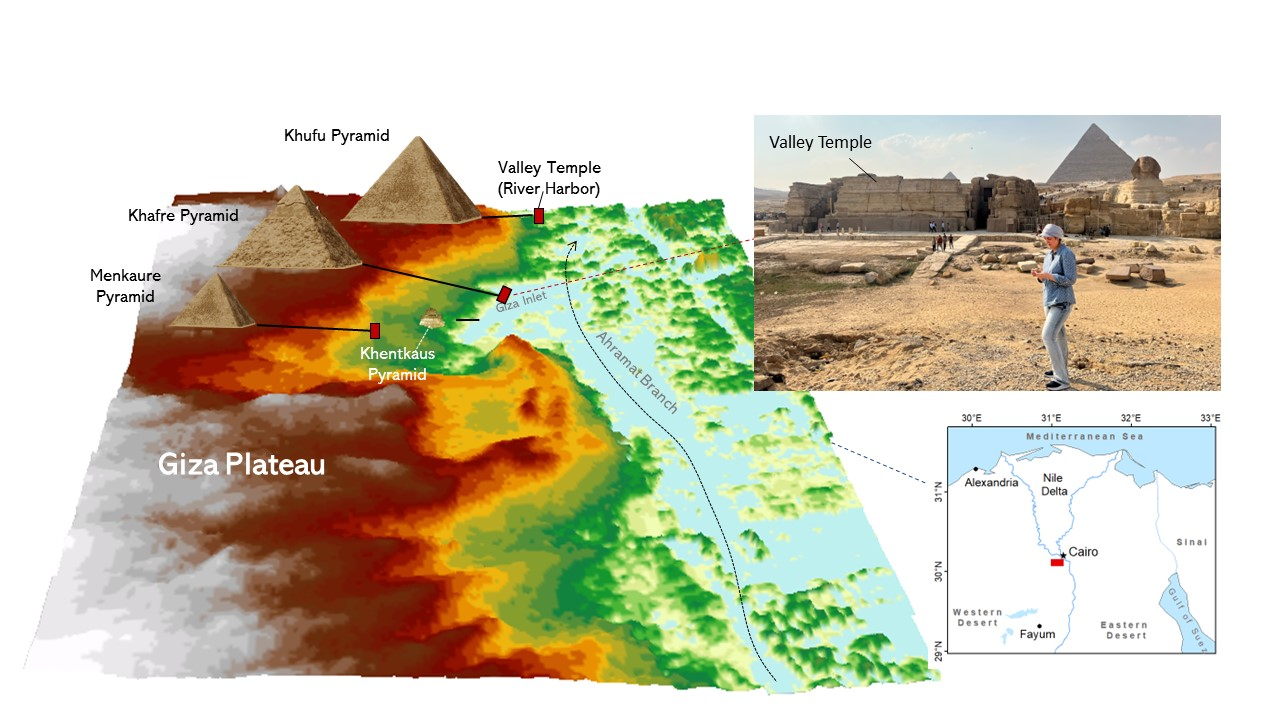
Eman Ghoneim: The Discovery of a long lost Nile branch, which helped with the building of the Ancient Egyptian Pyramids

== Career and research ==
Eman Ghoneim graduated with an honor degree and received her master's degree from the Geography Department at Tanta University, Egypt in 1997. She was awarded her Ph.D. degree in geography from the Geography Department at the University of Southampton, UK in 2002. In 2003, she held a postdoctoral position at the center for Remote Sensing, Boston University, United States. It was during this time that she helped discover the Kebira Crater. In 2010, she joined the Department of Earth and Ocean Sciences at the University of North Carolina Wilmington (UNCW) and became the director of the Space and Drone Remote Sensing Lab (SDRS).

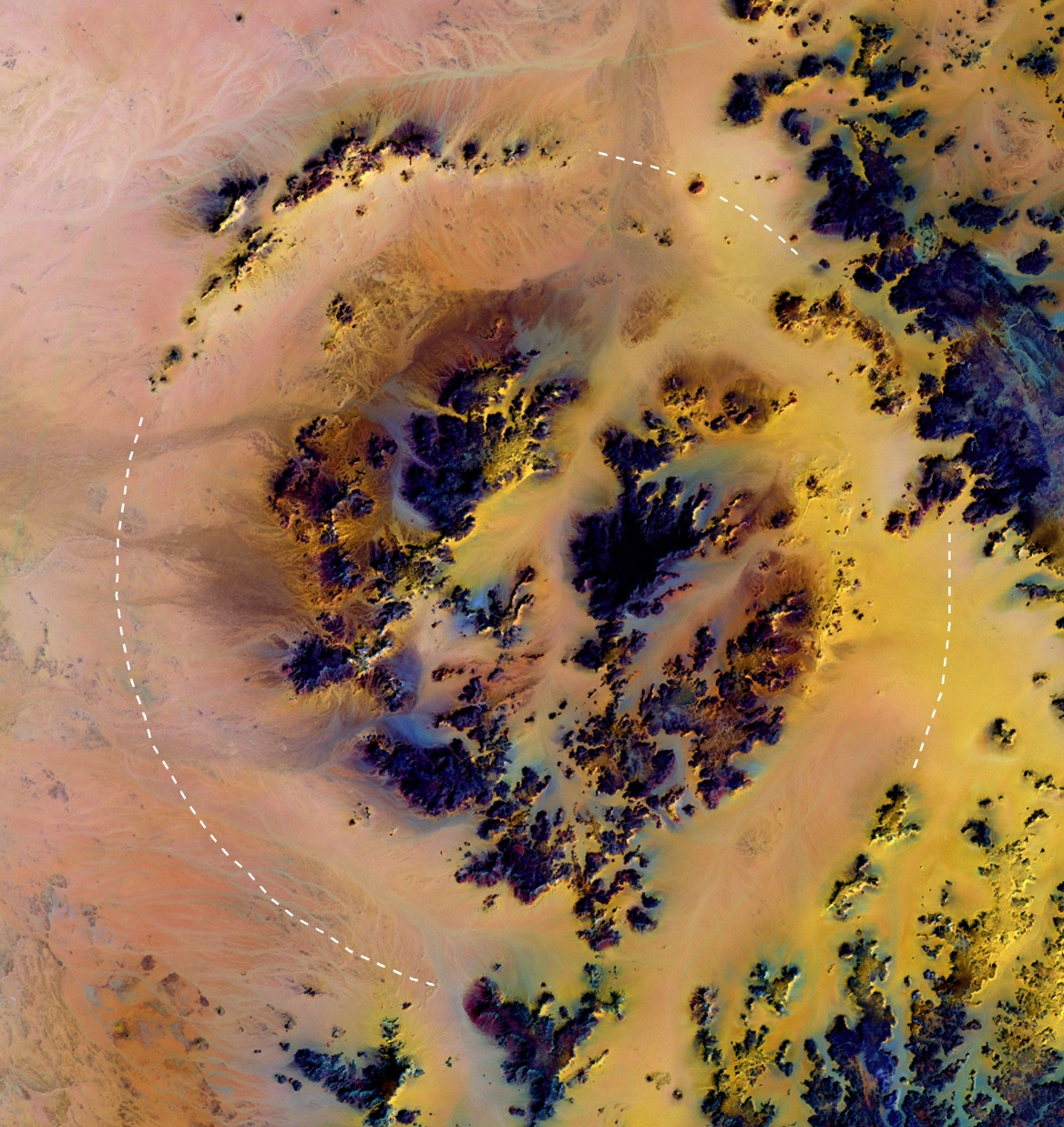
Satellite image of the Kebira Crater

She has a primary focus on the application of geographic information system (GIS), remote sensing (including multispectral, thermal and microwave radar imagery), unmanned aerial vehicle (UAV) and the use of hydrologic modeling in flash flood hazard, sea level rise, drought and groundwater exploration in arid and coastal environments. Ghoneim is an expert in image processing and uses a wide array of satellite/space data including multi-spectral, hyper-spectral, thermal infrared (TIR), microwave (radar images) and digital elevation model (DEM). Her research integrates geophysical and geospatial methods, utilizing Digital Elevation Models (DEMs) and satellite imagery to develop geothermal maps that assess geothermal gradients and surface temperatures, particularly in Egypt's Western Desert. Additionally, her work in topography mapping leverages high-resolution satellite data, such as Sentinel-2 and Landsat, to chart the Nile Valley's features and trace ancient river systems potentially linked to early civilizations. Furthermore, she employs radar topographic data from the Shuttle Radar Topography Mission (SRTM) and Synthetic Aperture Radar (SAR) to uncover buried river channels in the Eastern Sahara, identifying paleo-channels with significant historical implications for ancient settlements and ecosystems.

Ghoneim has published more than 40 peer-reviewed papers. She has published more than 80 conference articles and delivered a number of workshops, seminar lectures and training courses for multidisciplinary delegates.

Ghoneim was invited as an expert in her field, along with 30 other Egyptian expatriate women, to participate in the Taa Marbouta conference in 2017. The conference, which focused on the importance of Egyptian women in social, political and economic fields, was organized by the Ministry of Immigration and Egyptian Expatriates’ Affairs and the National Council for Women.

In addition to her research work, Ghoneim has been teaching in higher education since 1990. In recognition of her teaching work, she has been awarded multiple prizes, including the Board of Trustees Teaching Excellence Award at the University of North Carolina Wilmington in 2018.

== Awards and honors ==
- Graduate Faculty Mentor Award, University of North Carolina Wilmington (2025)
- UNC Board of Governors for Excellence in Teaching Award (2021)
- Board of Trustees Teaching Excellence Award, University of North Carolina Wilmington (2018)
- Distinguished Teaching Professorship Award, University of North Carolina Wilmington
- Chancellor's Teaching Excellence Award, University of North Carolina Wilmington (2017)
- ‘Egyptian Women Can’ Award (2017)
- Women Leaders in STEM
- Best Letter Award by the Remote Sensing and Photogrammetry Society of the United Kingdom for the paper “Largest crater shape in the Great Sahara revealed by multi-spectral images and radar data” (2007)
- Egyptian Government Scholarship for Graduate Study in the United Kingdom (1997)
- Best Student of the Year Award From Tanta University (1990)

== Selected publications ==
- Bumgarner, L., Ghoneim, E., Fathy, M., Cross, P., El-Behaedi, R., Onstine, S., Ralph, T. J., Marsan, Y., Benedetti, M., Gao, P., Tristant, Y., & Fahil, A. S. (2026). Unveiling Ancient Nile Channels in Qena, Egypt: A Spaceborne Imagery Approach Using Google Earth Engine. Remote Sensing, 18(8), 1184. https://doi.org/10.3390/rs18081184
- Fernando, B., You, Y., Ryu, J., Huffman, G., Ghoneim, E., and Gamble, D., 2025. Global precipitation estimate error decomposition analysis for 14 passive microwave sensors. Geophysical Research Letters, 52, e2024GL113631. https://doi.org/10.1029/2024GL113631
- Ghoneim, E., Ralph T., Onstine S., El-Behaedi R., El-Qady, G., Fahil, A., Hafez, M., Atya, M., Ebrahim, M., Khozym, A., Fathy, M., 2024. The Egyptian pyramid chain was built along the now abandoned Ahramat Nile Branch. Communication Earth and Environment. 5, 233.
- Healey, C., Ghoneim, E., Loh AI., and You, Y., 2024. Predicting land cover using a GIS-based Markov Chain and sea level inundation for a coastal area. Land. 13(6), 775.
- Ghoneim, E., Healey, C., Hemida, M., Shebl, A., Fahil, A., 2023. Integration of Geophysical and Geospatial Techniques to Evaluate Geothermal Energy at Siwa Oasis, Western Desert, Egypt., Remote Sensing, 15, 5094.
- Mansour, S., Ghoneim, E., El-Kersh, A., Said, S., Abdelnaby, S. 2023. Spatiotemporal Monitoring of Urban Sprawl in a Coastal City Using GIS-Based Markov Chain and Artificial Neural Network (ANN). Remote Sensing. 15, 601.
- Beckman, J.N.; Long, J.W.; Hawkes, A.D.; Leonard, L.A.; Ghoneim, E. 2021. Investigating Controls on Barrier Island Overwash and Evolution during Extreme Storms. Water, 13, 2829.
- Fahil, A.S, Ghoneim, E., Noweir, M.A., Masoud, A. 2020. Integration of Well Logging and Remote Sensing Data for Detecting Potential Geothermal Sites along the Gulf of Suez, Egypt. Resources 9, 109
- Ghoneim, E., El-Baz, F., 2020. Satellite image data integration for groundwater exploration in Egypt. In: Elbeih S., Negm A., Kostianoy A (edit), Egypt Environment: a Satellite Remote Sensing Approach. Springer. Chapter 8. 211–230.
- Bratley, K., Ghoneim, E. 2018. Modeling Urban Encroachment on the Agricultural Land of the Eastern Nile Delta Using Remote Sensing and GIS-based Markov Chain Model. Land 7(4), 114.
- Mashaly, J., Ghoneim, E. 2018. Flash Flood Hazard Using Optical, Radar, and Stereo-Pair Derived DEM: Eastern Desert, Egypt. Remote Sensing. 10(8), 1204. (Special Issue)
- Ghoneim, E. 2018. Rimaal: A Sand Buried Structure of Possible Impact Origin in the Sahara: Optical and Radar Remote Sensing Investigation. Remote Sensing 10 (6), 880.
- Abrams, W., Ghoneim, E., Shew, R., LaMaskin, T., Al Bloushi, K., Hussein, S., AbuBakr, M., Almulla, A., Al-Awar, M., El-Baz, F. 2018. Delineation of Groundwater Potential in the northern United Arab Emirates and Oman using geospatial technologies in conjunction with SAW, AHP and PFR techniques. Journal of Arid Environment, 157: 77–96.
- El-Behaedi, R., Ghoneim, E. 2018. Flood Risk Assessment of the Abu Simbel Temple Complex (Egypt) based on High-Resolution Spaceborne Stereo Imagery. Journal of Archaeological Science: Reports 20: 458–467.
- Ghoneim, E., Dorofeeva, A., Benedetti, M., Gamble, G., Leonard, L., AbuBakr, M. 2017. Vegetation Drought Analysis in Tunisia: A Geospatial Investigation. Journal of Atmospheric and Earth Sciences 1(1-002), 1–9.
- Robinson, C., El-Kaliouby, H., Ghoneim, E. 2017. Influence of Structures on Drainage Patterns in the Tushka Region, SW Egypt. Journal of African Earth Sciences, 136: 262–271. (Special Issue)
- Aljenaid, S., Ghoneim, E., Abido, M., AlWedhai, K., Khadim, G., Mansoor, S., EL-Deen, W., Abd Hameed, N. 2017. Integrating Remote Sensing and Field Survey to Map Shallow Water Benthic Habitat for the Kingdom of Bahrain. Journal of Environmental Science and Engineering B 6: 176–200.
- Sosnowski, A., Ghoneim, E., Burke, J. J., Hines, E., Halls, J. 2016. Remote regions, remote data: A spatial investigation of precipitation, dynamic land covers, and conflict in the Sudd wetland of South Sudan. Applied Geography, 69: 51–64.
- Rogers, S., Benford, E., Kennedy, A., Austin M., and Ghoneim, E. 2015. Building Damage Analysis following Hurricane Ike on the Bolivar Peninsula, TX. Proc., Coastal structures and solutions to coastal disasters 2015: resilient coastal communities. American Society of Civil Engineers (ASCE), 161–171.
- Ghoneim E., Mashaly, J., Gamble, D., Halls, J., AbuBakr, M. 2015. The use of automated shorelines to assess the response of pre- and post-beach protection and projected shoreline change in the Rosetta Promontory, Nile Delta. Geomorphology, 228, 1–14.
- Ghoneim, E., Foody, G. 2013. Assessing flash flood hazard in an arid mountainous region. Arabian Journal of Geosciences 6 (4): 1191–1202.
- AbuBakr, M., Ghoneim, E., El-Baz, F., Zeneldin, M., Zeid, S. 2013. Use of radar data to unveil the paleolakes and the ancestral course of Wadi El-Arish, Sinai Peninsula, Egypt. Geomorphology, 194, 34–45.
- Abdelkareem, M., Ghoneim, E., El-Baz., F., Askawy, A. 2012. New Insight on Paleoriver Development in the Eastern Sahara. Journal of African Earth Sciences, 62 (1): 35 - 40.
- Abdelkareem, M., El-Baz, F. Askalawy, M., Askawy, A., Ghoneim, E. 2012. Groundwater Prospect map of Egypt's Qena Valley using data fusion. International Journal of Image and Data Fusion 3(2): 169 – 189.
- Ghoneim, E., Benedetti, M., El-Baz, F. 2012. An Integrated Remote Sensing and GIS Analysis of the Kufrah Paleoriver, Eastern Sahara, Libya. Geomorphology, 139: 242 – 257.
- Shaban, A., Hamzé, M., El-Baz, F., Ghoneim, E. 2009. Characterization of oil spill along the Lebanese coast by remote sensing. Environmental Forensics Journal, 10 (1): 51–59.
- Gaber, A., Ghoneim, E., Khalaf, F., El-Baz, F. 2009. Delineation of Paleolakes in Arid Regions Using Remote Sensing and GIS. Journal of Arid Environments, 73: 127–134.
- Ghoneim, E. Ibn-Batutah: 2009. A possible simple impact structure in southeastern Libya. Geomorphology, 103 (3): 340–350.
- Ghoneim, E. 2009. A Remote Sensing Study of Some Impacts of Global Warming on the Arab Region. In: Tolba, M and Saab, N. (edit), Report on Arab Environment: Climate Change, The Arab Forum for Environment and Development, Chapter 3: 31–46.
- Ghoneim, E. 2008. Optimum groundwater locations in the Northern United Arab Emirates. International Journal of Remote Sensing, 29 (20): 5879–5906.
- Ghoneim, E., El-Baz F. 2008. Mapping water basins in the Eastern Sahara by SRTM data. IEEE 1: 1- 4.
- Ghoneim, E., Robinson, C., El-Baz, F. 2007. Relics of ancient drainage in the eastern Sahara revealed by radar topography data. International Journal of Remote Sensing, 28 (8): 1759–1772.
- El-Baz, F., Ghoneim, E. 2007. Largest crater in the Great Sahara revealed by multi-spectral images and radar data. International Journal of Remote Sensing, 28 (2): 451–458. (2007 Best Letter Award by RSPS).
- Ghoneim, E., El-Baz, F. 2007 The application of radar topographic data to mapping of a mega-paleodrainage in the Eastern Sahara. Journal of Arid Environments, 69: 658–675.
- Ghoneim, E., El-Baz, F. 2007. Dem-optical-radar data integration for paleo- hydrological mapping in the northern Darfur, Sudan: Implication for groundwater exploration. International Journal of Remote Sensing, 28 (22): 5001–5018.
- Shaban, A., Ghoneim, E., Hamzé, M., El-Baz, F. 2007. A post-conflict assessment to characterize the oil spill off-shore Lebanon by using remote sensing. Lebanese Science Journal, 8 (2), 75–85.
- El-Baz, F., Ghoneim, E. 2006. Veiled crater in the eastern Sahara. The Planetary Report; XXVI (4): 10–15.
- Foody, G., Ghoneim, E. Arnell, N. 2004. Predicting locations sensitive to flash flooding in an arid environment. Journal of Hydrology, 292: 48–58.
- Ghoneim, E., Arnell, N., Foody, G. 2002. Characterizing the flash flood hazards potential along the Red Sea coast of Egypt. The Extremes of the Extremes: Extraordinary Floods. IAHS Publ, 271: 211- 216.

== See also ==
- Timeline of women in science
