= Kebira Crater =

Circular feature in the Sahara

Coordinates: 24°40′N 24°58′E

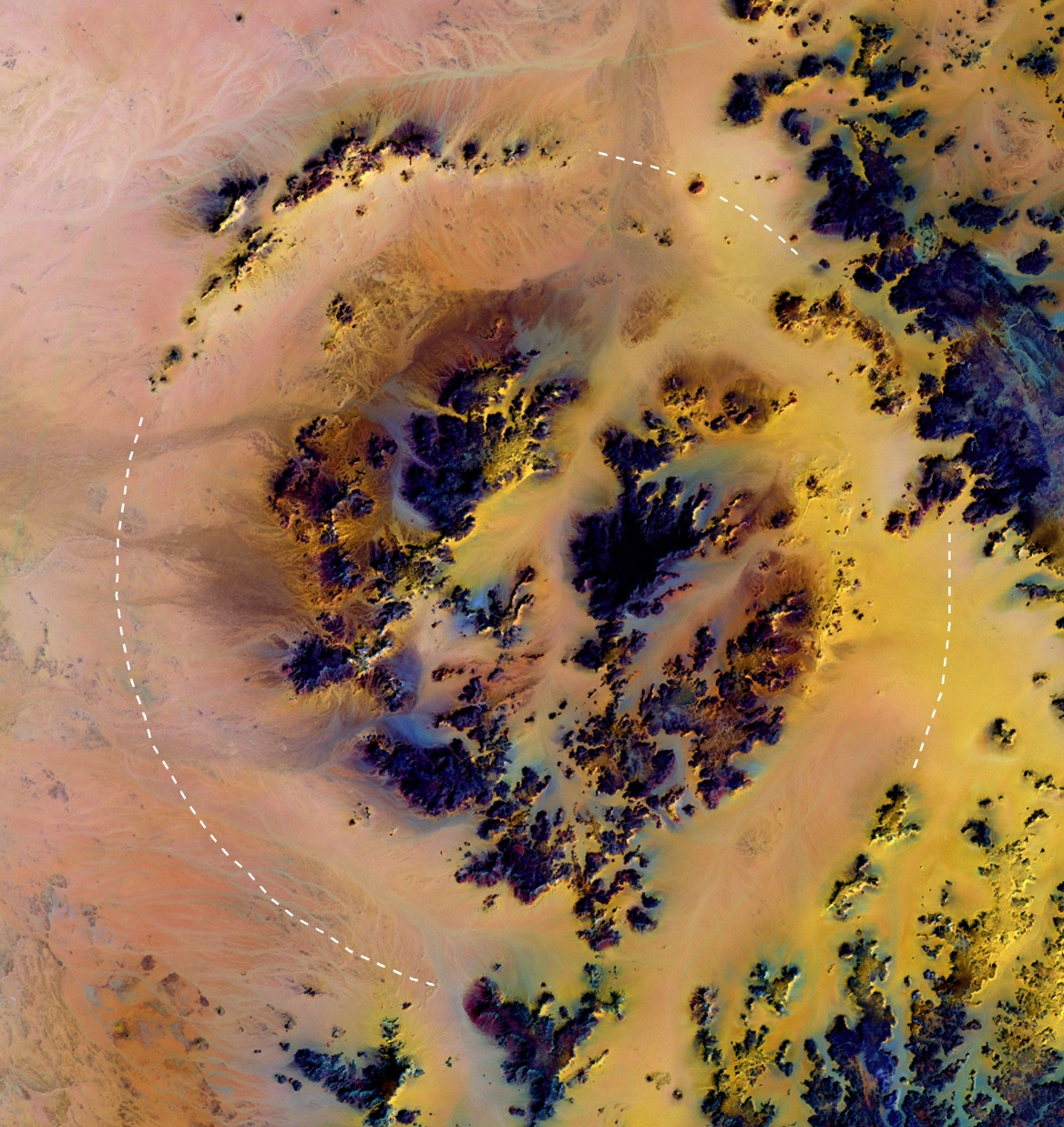
- Kebira Crater

Kebira Crater (Arabic: فوهة كبيرة) is the name given to a circular topographic feature that was identified in 2007 by Farouk El-Baz and Eman Ghoneim using satellite imagery, Radarsat-1, and Shuttle Radar Topography Mission (SRTM) data in the Sahara desert. This feature straddles the border between Egypt and Libya. The name of this feature is derived from the Arabic word for "large", and also from its location near the Gilf Kebir ("Great Barrier") region in southwest Egypt. Based solely on their interpretations of the remote sensing data, they argue that this feature is an exceptionally large, double-ringed, extraterrestrial impact crater. They suggest that the crater's original appearance has been obscured by wind and water erosion over time. Finally, they speculated that this feature might be the source of the yellow-green silica glass fragments, known as "Libyan desert glass", that can be found across part of Egypt's Libyan Desert. They neither conducted any fieldwork at this feature nor studied any samples collected from it. However, the Kebira Crater is currently not listed in the Earth Impact Database. Field trips to investigate the feature have found no supporting evidence. The "central uplift" clearly retains the horizontal bedding of the surrounding sandstone tableland, providing clear evidence against a possible impact origin.

== Characteristics ==
According to their interpretations of Landsat Enhanced Thematic Mapper Plus (ETM + ) images, Radarsat-1 data, and SRTM data, El-Baz and Ghoneim described this circular feature as having a central peak, an inner ring, and discontinuous outer rim. The hypothetical outer rim is 31 kilometres (19 mi) in diameter. This feature consists of well-cemented, coarse- and fine-grained sandstones of the Gilf Kebir and Wadi Malik formations.

Were this an impact structure, it would be bigger than the largest confirmed impact structure in the region, the Oasis Impact Structure in Libya, which is approximately half the size, with a diameter of approximately 18 kilometres (11 mi). It is estimated that a meteorite large enough to have created a Kebira-sized impact structure would have been roughly 1 kilometre (0.75 mi) in diameter.

== Origin of Kebira Crater ==
Because it is based entirely on remote sensing data and the current lack of formally published field studies, ideas about the impact origin of the Kebira Crater remain unconfirmed and untested according to papers published in the formal scientific literature. In one paper, it and some other recently proposed impact structures are described as being "dubious." The Impact Field Studies Group's Impact Database (formerly Suspected Earth Impact Sites, SEIS) list rates this as improbable for an impact origin. This catalog notes that the observed circular area was visible in Google Earth as having a flat top in the center. They suggest that the flat tops indicates that the strata within the center of this feature is flat-lying and undisturbed. If this is an impact structure, the strata within the center of it would not be flat lying. Instead, the strata within it center would be complexly and distinctly folded, tilted, and faulted as a result of an extraterrestrial impact.

After the existence of a possible impact structure was announced, in early March 2006 an expedition traveled through the site and informally published their findings: "[C]ontinued north . . towards a large circular feature that was recently announced to be an 'impact crater' . . We drove past the 'central uplift' along its western edge, then drove into the central part. It is evident, that what is considered the 'central uplift' is in fact nothing more than an eroded outlier of the Gilf, the undisturbed horizontal bedding being clearly visible at all times. The circular shape appears to be pure coincidence, the whole feature is the result of drainage patterns and subsequent eolian erosion, there is nothing to suggest its impact origin." And "We were now in the crater area, looking at the western edge of the central uplift area of the 'crater'. What we saw were uniform horizontal layers of sedimentary rocks, undisturbed except by the processes of natural erosion. The jumbled, chaotic rock formation that we would expect to see in the central uplift area of a crater was not evident at all."

A study published in Meteoritics & Planetary Science reported a field investigation of another "crater field" East of the Gilf Kebir, also reported based on remote sensing data. After analyzing the presence/absence of several geologic features associated with impact craters, such as target rocks, breccias, pseudo-shatter cones, and circular morphology, the authors concluded: "[T]here are [sic] no clear and unequivocal evidence supporting the impact origin of the circular structures in Glif Kebir region; until substantial evidence is produced, it's necessary to identify the origin of the craters in others [sic] endogenic geological processes." They proposed the most likely alternative source of the crater to be a hydrothermal vent, although they went on to say: "However, even this hypothesis is not fully satisfactory: probably these complex and peculiar features are the result of interaction between different geological process. At present, this hypothesis cannot be completely constrained; further investigations are necessary. Anyway, the lacking of clear evidences of a meteoritic impact and the geological framework of the investigated area, lead us to confirm the hydrothermal-volcanic hypothesis.

== Libyan desert glass source ==
As noted by Longinelli and others, the Carboniferous Wadi Malik Formation and erosional remnants of the Lower Cretaceous Gilf Kebir Formation, which are exposed within this proposed impact structure, "have been considered as possible source materials for LDG despite the lack of clear evidence" for the origin of this feature as the result of an extraterrestrial impact. Because of its size and hypothesized origin, El-Baz and Ghoneim speculated that the Kebira Crater was the source of Libyan desert glass that is found scattered over about 6,500 km^{2} (2,510 sq mi) within the Great Sand Sea in western Egypt and near the Libyan border. Aboud also suggested that if the Kebira Crater is an impact structure, it might be the solution to the mystery about the source of Libyan desert glass. However, he cautioned that origin of this feature was still largely conjecture that required additional research to confirm. Ramirez-Cardona and others also suggested that the Kebira Crater might be the source of Libyan desert glass. Instead of proposing that Libyan desert glass was ejected from this feature by an impact, they hypothesized that it was transported from it by an Oligocene-Miocene Gilf River system that contained the Kebira Crater within its drainage basin. They also noted that evidence for the Kebira Crater being an impact structure lacked direct field observations. Most recently, Longinelli and others studied the oxygen isotope and chemical composition of Libyan desert glass and samples of sands and sandstone from its proposed source areas. They found that the mean oxygen isotope values of the sandstone samples from the Kebira Crater differed greatly from their Libyan desert glass samples. Because of this, they concluded that the sandstone exposed in this feature can be ruled out as being the source of Libyan desert glass.

== See also ==
- List of possible impact structures on Earth
