= Banwari Lal (biotechnologist) =

Indian environmental and biotechnologist

- Born: 1 July 1960 (age 66); Rajasthan, India
- Education: University of Rajasthan
- Known for: Development of oilzapper technology
- Awards: 2001 All India Biotech Association Award; 2002 Biotech Product and Process Development for Commercialization Award; 2002 Jawarharlal Nehru Memorial National Gold Medal; 2002 Burhani Foundation-NEERI Award; 2003 National Petroleum Management Programme Award; 2004 N-BIOS Prize; 2005 NRDC Innovation Award; 2008 Biotech Product and Process Development for Commercialization Award
- Scientific career
- Fields: Biotechnology
- Workplaces: The Energy and Resources Institute; TERI School of Advanced Studies

Banwari Lal (born 1 July 1960) is an Indian environmental and industrial biotechnologist and the director of the Environmental and Industrial Biotechnology Division at The Energy and Resources Institute (TERI). Known for the development of oilzapper technology, Dr. Lal is the chief executive officer of ONGC-TERI Biotech Limited, a collaborative venture between TERI and the Oil and Natural Gas Corporation since 2008. The Department of Biotechnology of the Government of India awarded him the National Bioscience Award for Career Development, one of the highest Indian science awards, for his contributions to biosciences in 2004. He have many Indian and international joint patents with ONGC, DBT, IOCL, OIL INDIA and TERI.

== Biography ==
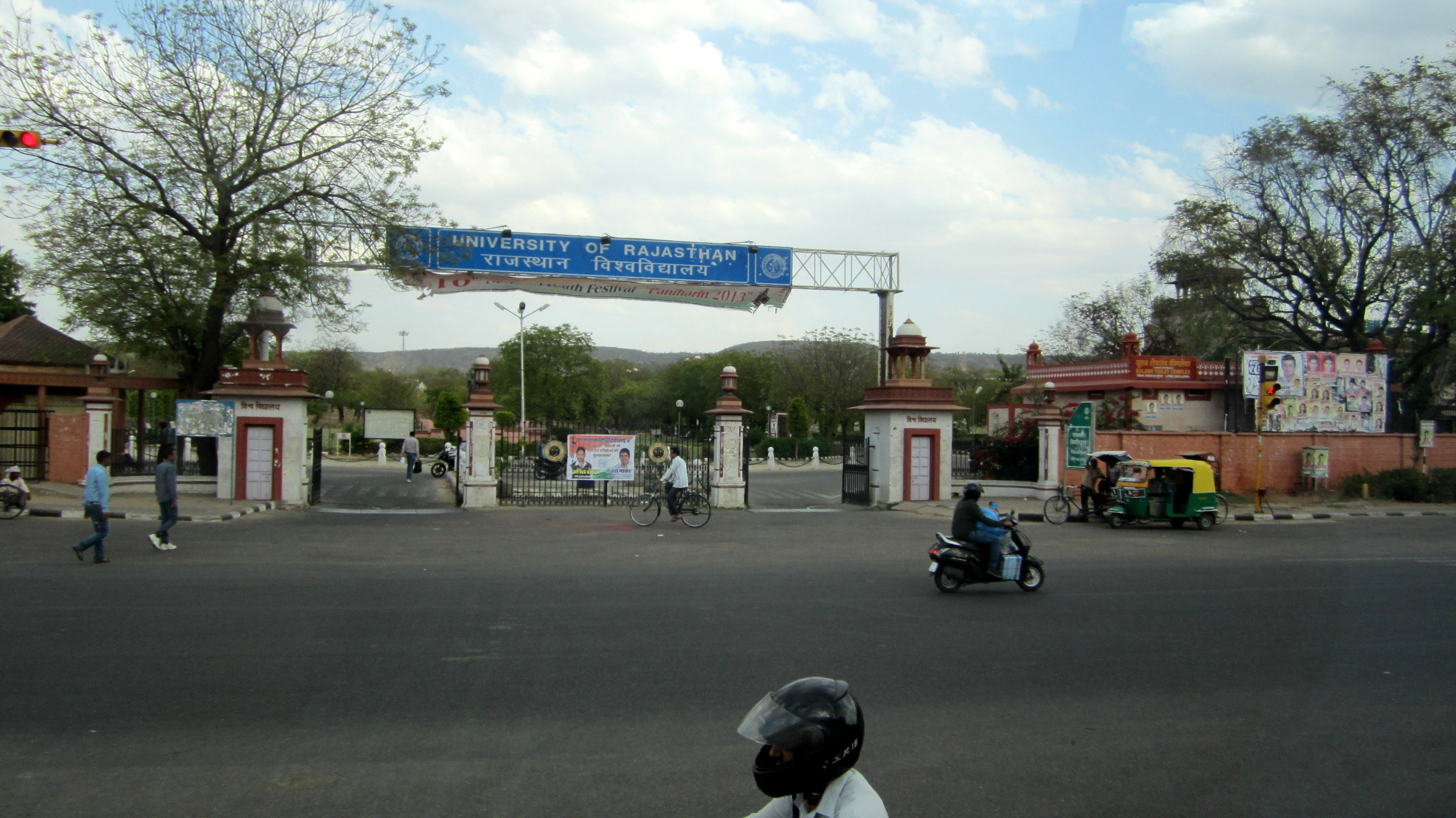
Entrance to the University of Rajasthan.

Lal, born on 1 July 1960 in the Indian state of Rajasthan, completed his undergraduate studies at The University of Rajasthan in 1981 and continued at the university to earn an MSc in microbiology in 1983. His doctoral studies were also at the same university and after securing a PhD in microbial biotechnology in 1987, he joined the TERI School of Advanced Studies as a member of faculty. He has served The Energy and Resources Institute in various capacities and is the director of the Environmental and Industrial Biotechnology. In 1996, when the Oil and Natural Gas Corporation and TERI formed ONGC TERI Biotech Limited (OTBL) for exploiting the commercial prospects of technologies developed by Lal, he became the chief operating officer of the newly formed company. He is associated with Glori Energy, a Houston-based energy firm, as the chief scientist and is a member of scientific panels of the Food Authority of India and the Food Safety and Standards Authority of India, both government agencies working under the Ministry of Health and Family Welfare.

== Legacy ==
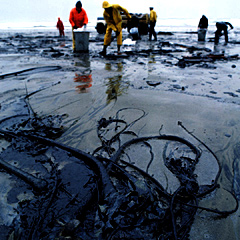
Oil spill

Lal's research interests covered the fields of bioresources as well as environmental and industrial biotechnology. He is known to have made contributions in the areas of clean technology development, bioremediation of oil contaminated sites, oil recovery using microbes, and preventive protocol development for blocking paraffin deposition in oil well flow lines. The team led by him developed an oilzapper technology, a bioremediative and organic technology for cleaning the oil spills using microbes and bacteria, which was later employed for cleaning the 2010 Mumbai oil spill. The technology is reported to be cost-effective and most of major oil companies in India such as the Indian Oil Corporation, Bharat Petroleum Corporation, Hindustan Petroleum Corporation, Oil and Natural Gas Corporation, Oil India, Indian Petrochemicals Corporation and Reliance Petroleum as well as Abu Dhabi National Oil Company employ it. His studies have been documented by way of a number of articles (Note: Please see Selected bibliography section) and ResearchGate, an online repository of scientific articles has listed 141 of them. Besides, he has published one book, Wealth from waste : trends and technologies. He holds 8 patents for the processes developed by him and various institutions. However some of patents he surrendered as per Goole patents. He is a member of the American Society for Microbiology, the Society of Applied Microbiology, the Society of General Microbiology, the International Water Association, the Society for Industrial Microbiology and the Association of Microbiologists of India.

== Awards and honors ==
Lal received the AIBA Award from the All India Biotech Association in 2001 and he was chosen to receive three awards in 2002 namely, the Biotech Product and Process Development for Commercialization Award of the Department of Biotechnology, the Jawarharlal Nehru Memorial National Gold Medal Award of the International Greenland Society and the Burhani Foundation-NEERI Award for the development of oilzapper technology. The National Petroleum Management Association presented him the Program Award in 2003 and he was one of the finalists shortlisted for the 2004 World Technology Award of the World Technology Network. The Department of Biotechnology of the Government of India awarded him the National Bioscience Award for Career Development, one of the highest Indian science awards in 2004. The same year, he received the NRDC Innovation Award of the National Research Development Corporation. The Department of Biotechnology honored him again with a second Biotech Product and Process Development for Commercialization Award in 2008, the award presented to him by the then President of India, A. P. J. Abdul Kalam.

== Selected bibliography ==
=== Patents ===
Lal has filed for patents to protect the following inventions. This listing includes patent applications that are pending as well as patents that have already been granted by the United States Patent and Trademark Office (USPTO).

==== Process for Enhanced Recovery of Crude Oil from Oil Wells Using Novel Microbial Consortium ====
Patent number: 7484560

Publication number: 20070092930

Abstract: The present invention provides a microbial consortium containing three hyperthermophilic, barophilic, acidogenic, anaerobic bacterial strains for enhanced oil recovery from oil reservoirs where temperatures range from 70 °C. to 90? C. The said microbial consortium is unique in producing a variety of metabolic products mainly CO_{2}, methane, biosurfactant, volatile fatty acids and alcohols in the presence of specially designed nutrient medium. These metabolic products increase sweep efficiency of crude oil from oil bearing poles of rock formation. The present invention also provides a process for enhancing the oil recovery by in situ application of the said microbial consortium.

Type: Grant

Filed: July 14, 2004

Date of Patent: February 3, 2009

Status: Expired - Fee Related

Adjusted expiration: 2025-02-05

Assignees: The Energy and Resource Institute, Institute of Reservoir Studies

Inventors: Banwari Lal, Mula Ramajaneya Varaprasada Reddy, Anil Agnihotri, Ashok Kumar, Munish Prasad Sarbhai, Nimmi Singh, Raj Karan Khurana, Shinben Kishen Khazanchi, Tilak Ram Misra

==== Wwllbore Treatment for Reducing Wax Deposits ====
Publication number: 20090025931

Abstract: A method of reducing wax deposition in an oil wellbore tubing are disclosed which comprise providing an aqueous bioslurry comprising at least one microbe capable of degrading paraffin wax at about 20 to 45 °C (68 to 113 °F). and a nutrient medium containing one or more carbon source and a source of O2. The method further includes providing an oil wellbore completion having a production tubing with an interior surface including a zone that is susceptible to wax deposition when the well is operated to produce oil.

Type: Application

Filed: June 12, 2008

Publication date: January 29, 2009

Patent Grant number: 7681638

Applicant: GLORI OIL LIMITED

Inventors: Bhupendra Soni, Banwari Lal

Status: Active

Anticipated expiration: 2028-06-12

==== Process for Enhanced Oil Recovery Usins a Microbial Consortium ====
Publication number: 20090029879

Abstract: A process and related apparatus for enhancing the oil recovery from an oil well are described. An embodiment of the process generally includes selection of a candidate reservoir; collecting oil formation water samples under anaerobic conditions; selecting media and enriching the microbes derived from the formation water; characterizing and identifying the selected consortium; mass scale production of the selected consortium; anaerobically preparing a defined composition nutrient medium, transportation of the nutrient medium by ISO tankers and the consortium by a specially designed field laboratory unit to the selected well treatment site; injecting the medium and consortium into the reservoir of the well; closing the well for the proliferation of microbes for one to three weeks; and allowing the microbes to dislodge oil in the reservoir and thereby enhance recovery of oil from the well.

Type: Application

Filed: July 2, 2008

Publication date: January 29, 2009

Applicant: GLORI OIL LIMITED

Inventors: Bhupendra SONI, Banwari LAL, John Allen BABCOCK

=== Books ===
- Lal, Banwari (2011). Wealth from waste : trends and technologies (Third ed.). New Delhi: The Energy and Resources Institute. ISBN 9788179934241. OCLC 858862144.

=== Articles ===
- Mishra, Sanjeet; Jyot, Jeevan; Kuhad, Ramesh Chander; Lal, Banwari (1 November 2001). "In Situ Bioremediation Potential of an Oily Sludge-Degrading Bacterial Consortium". Current Microbiology. 43 (5): 328–335. doi:10.1007/s002840010311. ISSN 0343-8651. PMID 11688796. S2CID 12173556.
- Singh, Sneha; Sudhakaran, Anu K.; Sarma, Priyangshu Manab; Subudhi, Sanjukta; Mandal, Ajoy Kumar; Gandham, Ganesh; Lal, Banwari (2010). "Dark fermentative biohydrogen production by mesophilic bacterial consortia isolated from riverbed sediments". International Journal of Hydrogen Energy. 35 (19): 10645–10652. doi:10.1016/j.ijhydene.2010.03.010.
- Chatterjee, Dibyendu; Mohanty, Sangita; Guru, Prabhat Kumar; Swain, Chinmaya Kumar; Tripathi, Rahul; Shahid, M.; Kumar, Upendra; Kumar, Anjani; Bhattacharyya, Pratap; Lal, Banwari (2018). "Comparative assessment of urea briquette applicators on greenhouse gas emission, nitrogen loss and soil enzymatic activities in tropical lowland rice". Agriculture, Ecosystems & Environment. 252: 178–190. Bibcode:2018AgEE..252..178C. doi:10.1016/j.agee.2017.10.013.

== See also ==
- Oil spill
- Spill containment
