= Fulgurite =

Rock type formed by lightning strike

Stereo image
Left frame
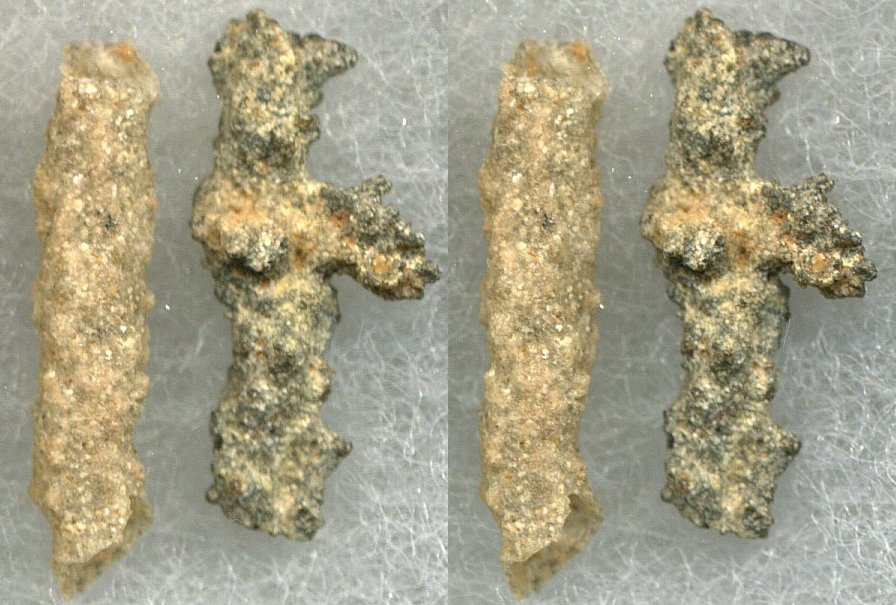
Right frame
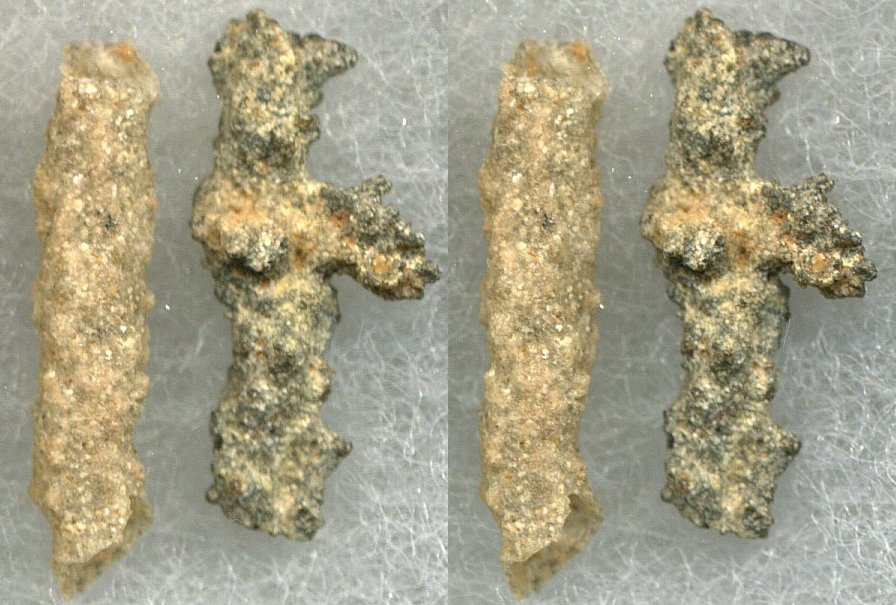
Parallel view
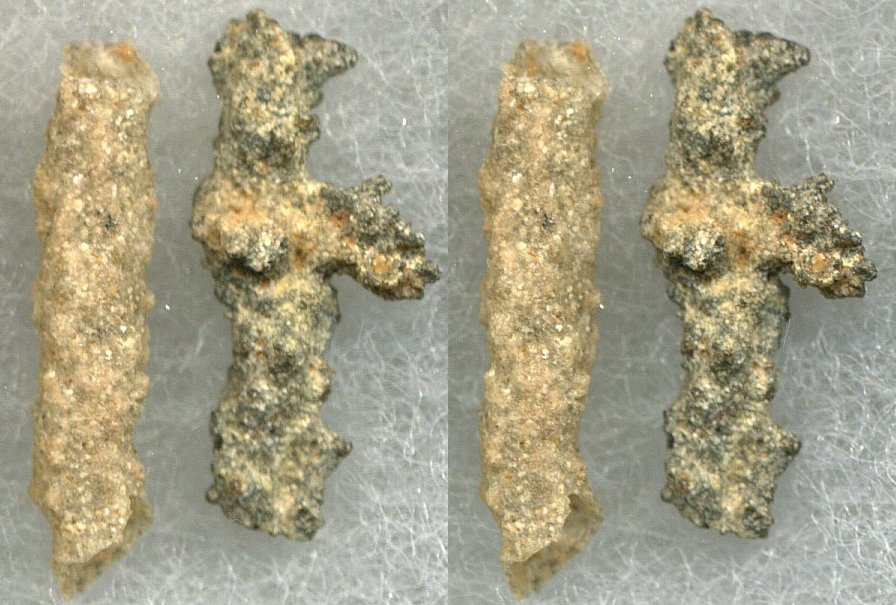
Cross-eye view
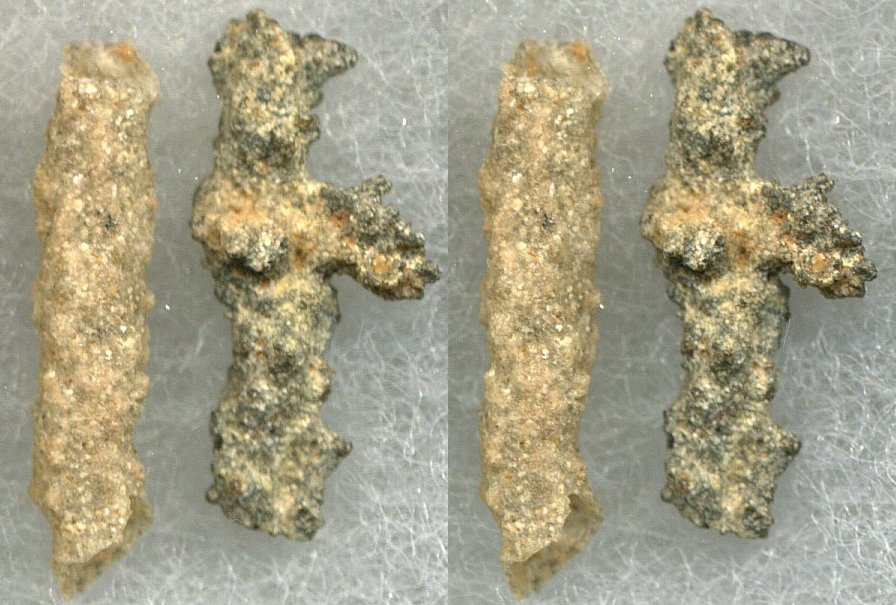

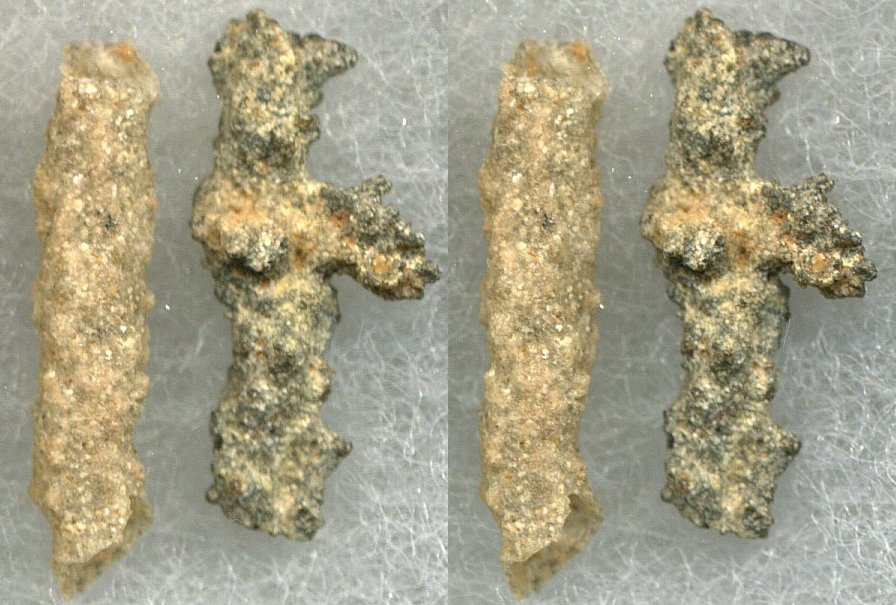
- Two Type I (arenaceous) fulgurites: a section of a common flower fulgurite and one exhibiting a branch

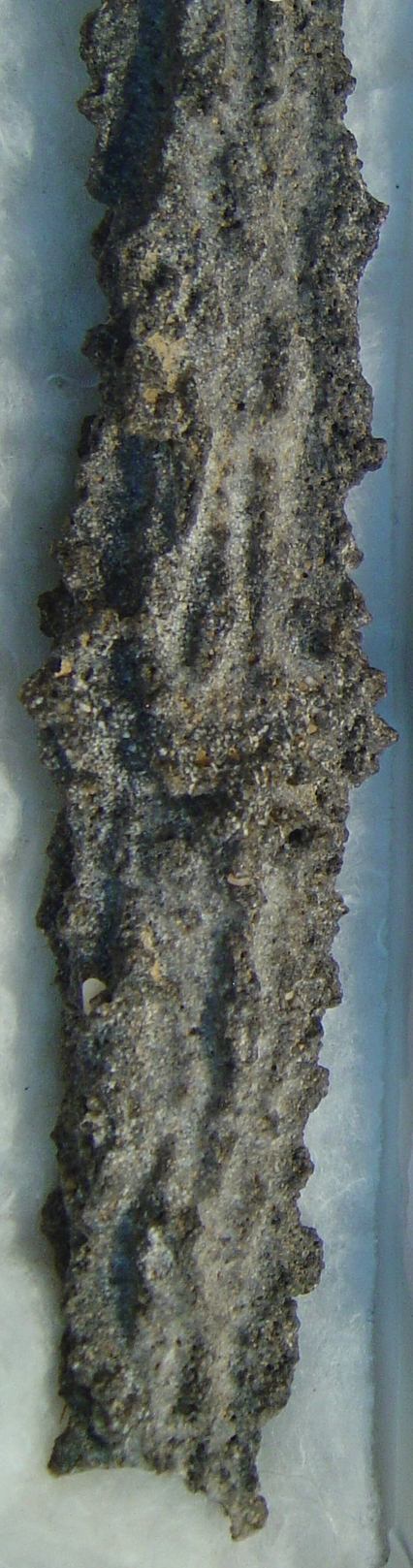
Fulgurite

Stereo image
Left frame
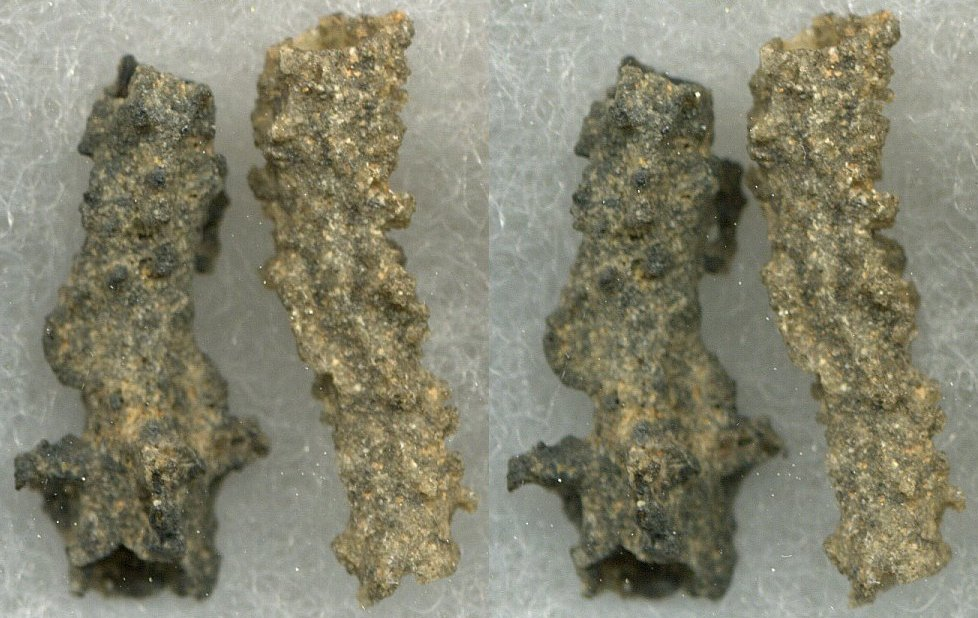
Right frame
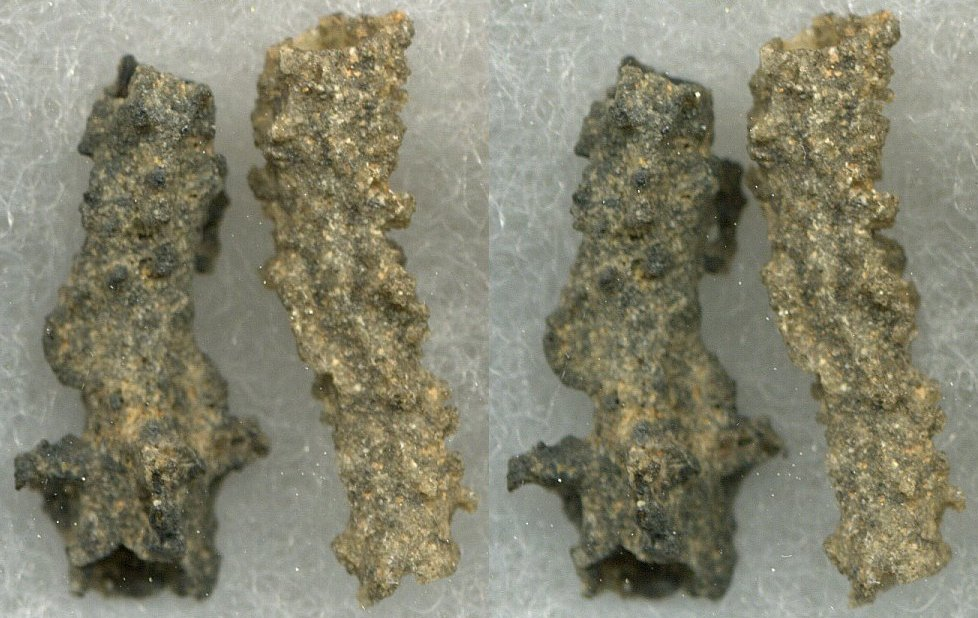
Parallel view
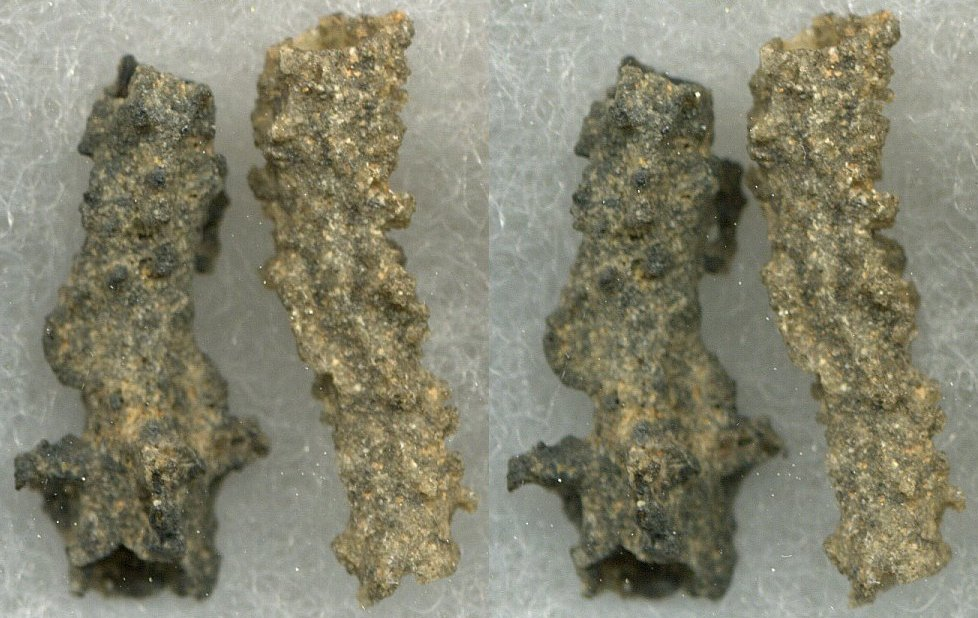
Cross-eye view
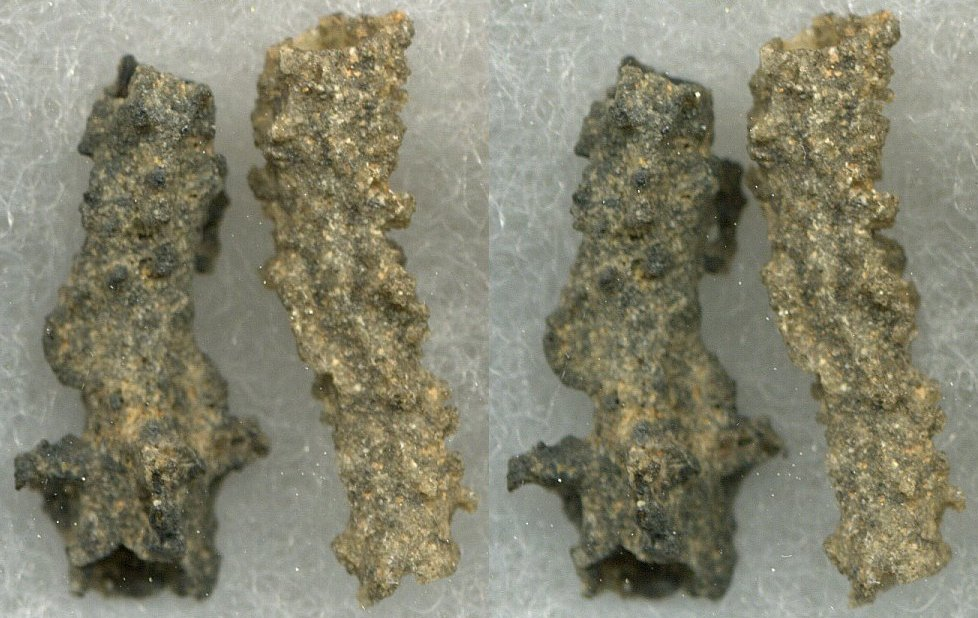

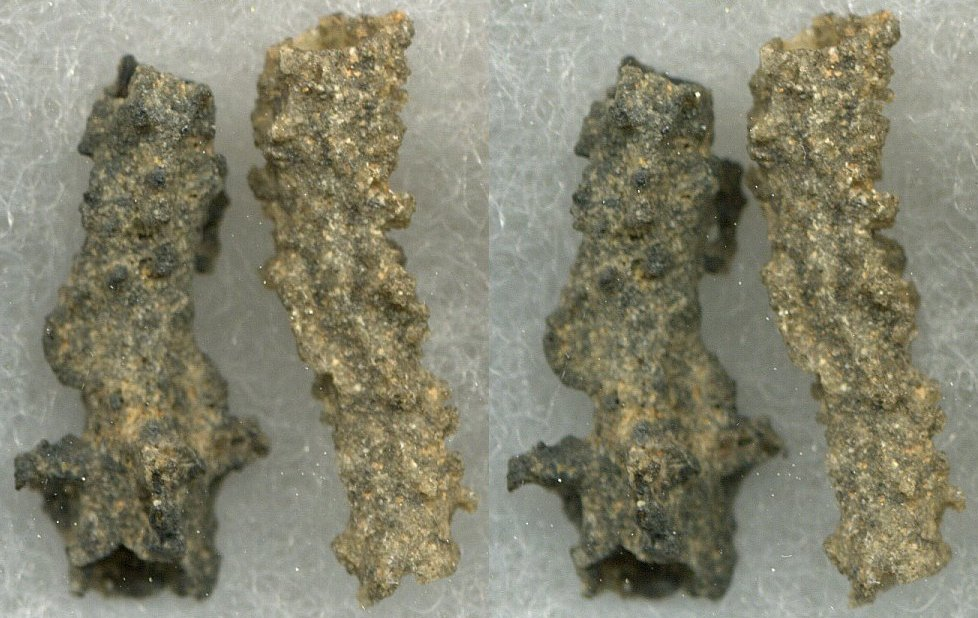
- Two small Type I Saharan Desert fulgurites. In a planar view the specimen on the right has a blade-like morphology, but its tubular nature is dramatically shown in a stereo view.

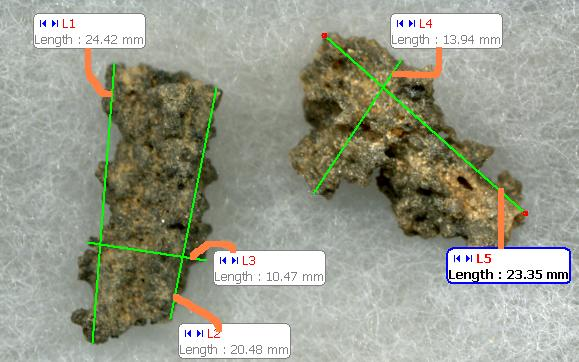
Typical broken fulgurite sections

Fulgurites (from Latin fulgur 'lightning' and -ite), commonly called "fossilized lightning", are natural tubes, clumps, or masses of sintered, vitrified, or fused soil, sand, rock, organic debris and other sediments that sometimes form when lightning discharges into ground. When composed of silica, fulgurites are classified as a variety of the mineraloid lechatelierite.

When ordinary negative polarity cloud-ground lightning discharges into a grounding substrate, greater than 100 million volts (100 MV) of potential difference may be bridged. Such current may propagate into silica-rich quartzose sand, mixed soil, clay, or other sediments, rapidly vaporizing and melting resistant materials within such a common dissipation regime. This results in the formation of generally hollow and/or vesicular, branching assemblages of glassy tubes, crusts, and clumped masses. Fulgurites have no fixed composition because their chemical composition is determined by the physical and chemical properties of whatever material is being struck by lightning.

Fulgurites are structurally similar to Lichtenberg figures, which are the branching patterns produced on surfaces of insulators during dielectric breakdown by high-voltage discharges, such as lightning.

== Description ==
Fulgurites are formed when lightning strikes the ground, fusing and vitrifying mineral grains. The primary SiO_{2} phase in common tube fulgurites is lechatelierite, an amorphous silica glass. Many fulgurites show some evidence of crystallization: in addition to glasses, many are partially protocrystalline or microcrystalline. Because fulgurites are generally amorphous in structure, fulgurites are classified as mineraloids. Peak temperatures within a lightning channel exceed 30,000 K, with sufficient pressure to produce planar deformation features in SiO_{2}, a kind of polymorphism. This is also known colloquially as shocked quartz.

Material properties (size, color, texture) of fulgurites vary widely, depending on the size of the lightning bolt and the composition and moisture content of the surface struck by lightning. Most natural fulgurites fall on a spectrum from white to black. Iron is a common impurity that can result in a deep brownish-green coloration. Lechatelierite similar to fulgurites can also be produced via controlled (or uncontrolled) arcing of artificial electricity into a medium. Downed high voltage power lines have produced brightly colored lechatelierites, due to the incorporation of copper or other materials from the power lines. Brightly colored lechatelierites resembling fulgurites are usually synthetic and reflect the incorporation of synthetic materials. However, lightning can strike man-made objects, resulting in colored fulgurites.

The interior of Type I (sand) fulgurites normally is smooth or lined with fine bubbles, while their exteriors are coated with rough sedimentary particles or small rocks. Other types of fulgurites are usually vesicular, and may lack an open central tube; their exteriors can be porous or smooth. Branching fulgurites display fractal-like self-similarity and structural scale invariance as a macroscopic or microscopic network of root-like branches, and can display this texture without central channels or obvious divergence from morphology of context or target (e.g. sheet-like melt, rock fulgurites). Fulgurites are usually fragile, making the field collection of large specimens difficult.

Fulgurites can exceed 20 centimeters in diameter and can penetrate deep into the subsoil, sometimes occurring as far as 15 m (49 ft) below the surface that was struck, although they may also form directly on a sedimentary surface. One of the longest fulgurites to have been found in modern times was a little over 4.9 m (16 ft) in length, found in northern Florida. The Yale University Peabody Museum of Natural History displays one of the longest known preserved fulgurites, approximately 4 m (13 ft) in length. Charles Darwin in The Voyage of the Beagle recorded that tubes such as these found in Drigg, Cumberland, UK reached a length of 9.1 m (30 ft). Fulgurites at Winans Lake, Livingston County, Michigan, extended discontinuously throughout a 30 m range and arguably include the largest reported fulgurite mass ever recovered and described: its largest section extending approximately 16 ft (4.88 m) in length by 1 ft in diameter (30 cm).

=== Classification ===
Fulgurites have been classified into five types related to the type of sediment in which the fulgurite formed, as follows:

- Type I – sand fulgurites with tubular structure; their central axial void may be collapsed
- Type II – soil fulgurites; these are glass-rich, and form in a wide range of sediment compositions, including clay-rich soils, silt-rich soils, gravel-rich soils, and loessoid; these may be tubular, branching, vesicular, irregular or slaggy, or may display a combination of these structures, and can produce exogenic fulgurites (droplet fulgurites)
- Type III – caliche or calcic sediment fulgurites, having thick, often surficially glazed granular walls with calcium-rich vitreous groundmass with little or no lechatelierite glass; their shapes are variable, with multiple narrow central channels common, and can span the entire range of morphological and structural variation for fulguritic objects
- Type IV – rock fulgurites, which are either crusts on minimally altered rocks, networks of tunneling within rocks, vesicular outgassed rocks (often glazed by a silicide-rich and/or metal oxide crust), or completely vitrified and dense rock material and masses of these forms with little sedimentary groundmass
- Type V – [droplet] fulgurites (exogenic fulgurites), which show evidence of ejection (e.g. spheroidal, filamentous, or aerodynamic), related by composition to Type II and Type IV fulgurites
- phytofulgurite – a proposed class of objects resulting from partial to total alteration of biomass (e.g. grasses, lichens, moss, wood) by lightning, described as "natural glasses formed by cloud-to-ground lightning." These were excluded from the classification scheme because they are not glasses, so classifying them as a subset of fulgurites is debatable.

== Significance ==
The presence of fulgurites in an area can be used to estimate the frequency of lightning over a period of time, which can help to understand past regional climates. Paleolightning is the study of various indicators of past lightning strikes, primarily in the form of fulgurites and lightning-induced remanent magnetization signatures.

Many high-pressure, high-temperature materials have been observed in fulgurites. Many of these minerals and compounds are also known to be formed in extreme environments such as nuclear weapon tests, hypervelocity impacts, and interstellar space. Shocked quartz was first described in fulgurites in 1980. Other materials, including highly reduced silicon-metal alloys (silicides), the fullerene allotropes C_{60} (buckminsterfullerenes) and C_{70}, as well as high-pressure polymorphs of SiO_{2}, have since been identified in fulgurites. Reduced phosphides have been identified in fulgurites, in the form of schreibersite (Fe_{3}P and (Fe,Ni)_{3}P), and titanium(III) phosphide. These reduced compounds are otherwise rare on Earth due to the presence of oxygen in Earth's atmosphere, which creates oxidizing surface conditions.

== History ==
Fulgurite tubes have been mentioned already by Persian polymaths Avicenna and Al-Biruni in the 11th century, without knowing their true origination. Over the following centuries fulgurites have been described but misinterpreted as a result of subterrestrial fires, falsely attributing curative powers to them, e.g. by Leonhard David Hermann 1711 in his Maslographia. Other famous natural scientists, among them Charles Darwin, Horace Bénédict de Saussure and Alexander von Humboldt gave attention to fulgurites, among whom only Darwin noted a connection to lightning, elaborating the "measure or bore of lightning" that must have caused them, and referring to experiments carried out in Paris by M. Hachette and M. Beudant that succeeded in creating similar fulgurites upon passing strong shocks of galvanism through finely-powdered glass.

In 1805 the true process of forming fulgurites by lightning strikes to the ground was identified by agriculturist Hentzen and mineralogist and mining engineer Johann Karl Wilhelm Voigt. In 1817 mineralogist and mining engineer Karl Gustav Fiedler published and comprehensively documented the phenomenon in the Annalen der Physik.

== See also ==
- Electromechanical disintegration
- Impactite
- Tektite
- Trinitite
