= Banwari Lal Chouksey =

Indian machinist and inventor

- Born: Ganga Pipaliya, Bhopal district, Madhya Pradesh, India
- Occupation: Machinist
- Awards: Padma Shri; Mahatma Jyotiba Phule Samman; Vishwakarma Rashtriya Puraskar; Shrambhushan Samman

Banwari Lal Chouksey is an Indian machinist and inventor, known for his innovative engineering ideas. He was born in Ganga Pipaliya, in Bhopal district of the Indian state of Madhya Pradesh and did not have formal education beyond high school level. He started his career with Bharat Heavy Electricals Limited as a mechanical labourer where he rose in ranks to become an engineer. He is reported to have designed alternative spare parts for heavy machinery which saved money for the company and he holds patents for some of his inventions. He is the recipient of the several awards such as Mahatma Jyotiba Phule Samman of the Government of Madhya Pradesh, Vishwakarma Rashtriya Puraskar and Shrambhushan Samman. The Government of India awarded him the fourth highest civilian honour of the Padma Shri, in 2005, for his contributions to Science and Technology.

== See also ==
- Bharat Heavy Electricals Limited
