= Electromechanical disintegration =

Geomorphological process

Electromechanical disintegration is a process in geomorphology in which lightning interacts in erosion and weathering.

An excellent example of this phenomenon is fracturing in the quartz formations of the Espinhaço mountains of Brazil. For many years, itinerant miners in these mountains have reported the appearance of broken boulders and fissures along the ground after lightning storms.

The Espinhaço Range represents a typical site for orographic thunderstorms, which develop from the ascent of air along mountain ranges. These storms have the highest rate of lightning occurrence and are therefore useful for studying the effects of such atmospheric discharges.

These discharges have peculiar features: velocities of 160,000 m/s (524,934 ft/s) and plasma temperatures of 30,000 °C (54,000 °F) are achieved in nanoseconds in lightning channels.

Evidences of the effect of lightning on rock are the presence of beta-quartz (T > 573 °C (1,060 °F), called "flashstones" by local diggers), melted barbed wires (T > 1,500 °C or 2,730 °F); furrows in soils and colluvium up to 120-metre (394 ft) long with the presence of cristobalite, the high-temperature modification of quartz (1,713–18 °C or 3,115–64 °F). In permeable Precambrian quartzites, the instantaneous shock rise of temperature from 15 to 1,500 °C (59 to 2,700 °F), or higher, results in an extremely severe explosion-like expansion of water, leading to the formation of fissures and widening of other systems. The evidence points to lightning action, since quartz can change its modification from α to β and back again without cracking, as long as the temperature change is less than 1 °C (1.8 °F) per minute. For this reason, cracks caused by solar radiation or fire can be ruled out.

An enormous pressure of about 35.00 bar (508 psi) can be estimated by the presence of coesite relicts, the rare high-pressure polymorph of quartz.

This lightning-induced weathering is one of the more important starting mechanisms for other weathering processes. Because of the increase in surface area, chemical weathering can attack each newly made fragment from all sides and can go deeper into bedrock as new cracks are formed or older ones extended. Thus, electromechanical disintegration is a new term for a type of weathering as old as the planet's lithosphere, and it represents an important exogenic process for the beginning of erosion and the formation of soils.

== See also ==
- Fulgurite
