= Junapani (census code 482215) =

- village
- Location within Madhya Pradesh Location within India
- Coordinates: 23.67738545°N 77.34087467°E
- Country: India
- State: Madhya Pradesh
- District: Bhopal
- Tehsil: Berasia
- Elevation: 541 m (1,775 ft)

Population (2011)
  - Total: 303
- Time zone: UTC+5:30 (IST)
- ISO 3166 code: MP-IN
- 2011 census code: 482215

Junapani is a village in the Bhopal district of Madhya Pradesh, India. It is located in the Berasia tehsil, near Bhojapura, off the Guna-Bhopal road.

== Demographics ==
According to the 2011 census of India, Junapani has 64 households. The effective literacy rate (i.e. the literacy rate of population excluding children aged 6 and below) is 47.04%.

Demographics (2011 Census)
| | Total | Male | Female |
|---|---|---|---|
| Population | 303 | 171 | 132 |
| Children aged below 6 years | 50 | 30 | 20 |
| Scheduled caste | 0 | 0 | 0 |
| Scheduled tribe | 0 | 0 | 0 |
| Literates | 119 | 78 | 41 |
| Workers (all) | 158 | 88 | 70 |
| Main workers (total) | 102 | 87 | 15 |
| Main workers: Cultivators | 80 | 69 | 11 |
| Main workers: Agricultural labourers | 16 | 15 | 1 |
| Main workers: Household industry workers | 0 | 0 | 0 |
| Main workers: Other | 6 | 3 | 3 |
| Marginal workers (total) | 56 | 1 | 55 |
| Marginal workers: Cultivators | 47 | 0 | 47 |
| Marginal workers: Agricultural labourers | 9 | 1 | 8 |
| Marginal workers: Household industry workers | 0 | 0 | 0 |
| Marginal workers: Others | 0 | 0 | 0 |
| Non-workers | 145 | 83 | 62 |
