= Libyan desert glass =

Desert glass found in Libya and Egypt

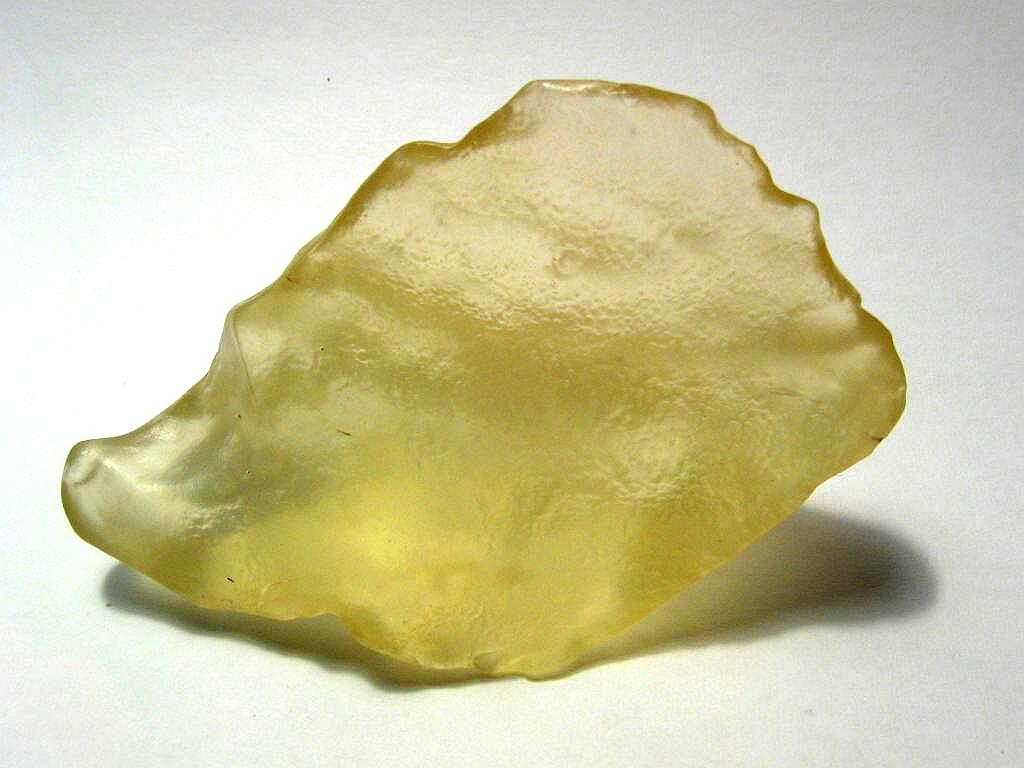
Libyan desert glass

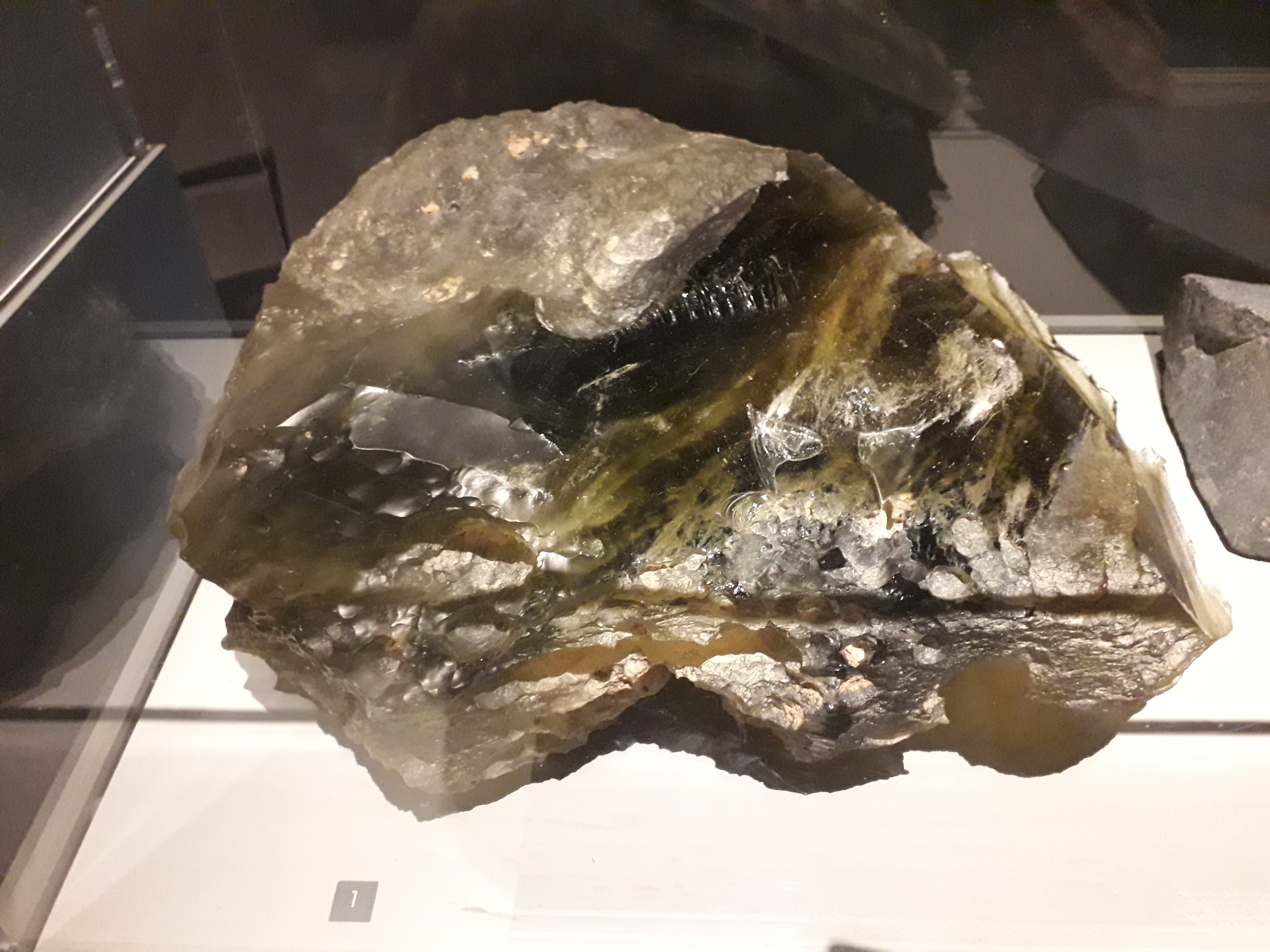
A large sample with mass 26 kg. Exhibited at the National Museum of Natural History in Paris in 2018.

Libyan desert glass or Great Sand Sea glass is an impactite, made mostly of lechatelierite, found in areas in the eastern Sahara, in the deserts of eastern Libya and western Egypt. Fragments of desert glass can be found over areas of tens of square kilometers. Like obsidian, it was knapped and used to make tools during the Pleistocene.

== Geologic origin ==
Pieces of Libyan desert glass from the Great Sand Sea, Egypt

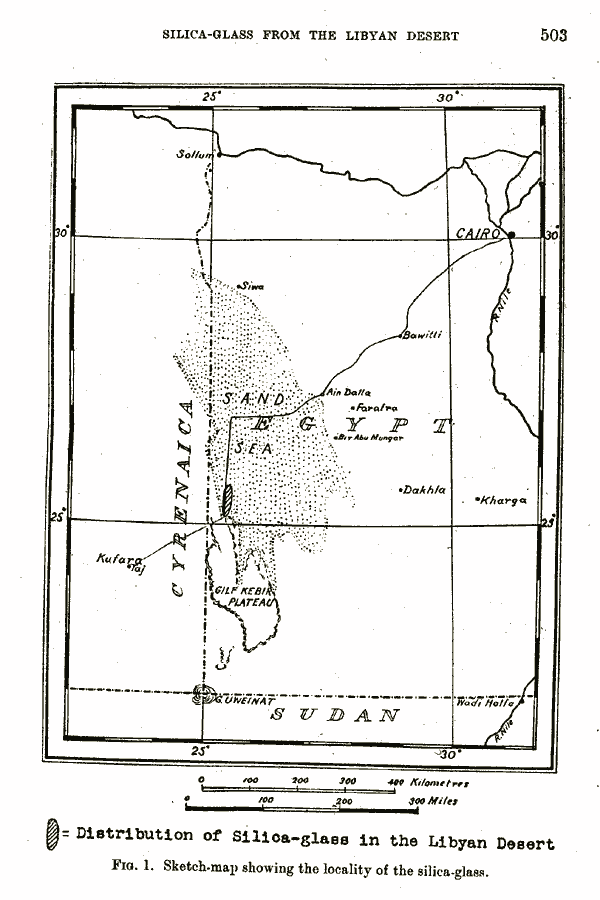
Partial distribution of Silica-glass in the Libyan Desert. 1934 map.

The origin of desert glass is uncertain. Meteoritic origins have long been considered possible, and recent research links the glass to impact features, such as zircon breakdown, vaporized quartz and meteoritic metals, and to an impact crater. Some geologists, based on a widely reported 2006 study by Sandia National Laboratories, associate the glass with radiative melting from meteoric large aerial bursts, making it analogous to trinitite created from sand exposed to the thermal radiation of a nuclear explosion. Libyan Desert glass has been dated as having formed about 29 million years ago.

Analysis of samples with the electron backscatter diffraction (EBSD) technique revealed zircon crystal structures that form only when reidite melts at very high temperatures and is then converted to zircon. Reidite has been found only at meteorite impact sites, where it was formed at the very high pressures of impact. Airbursts never yield this type of mineral transformation.

== See also ==
- Atacama desert glass – Impact glass found in the Atacama Desert
- Darwin glass – Natural tektite glass found in Tasmania
- Edeowie glass – Natural glass found in South Australia
- Hypatia (stone) – Candidate for the first comet nucleus
- Kebira Crater – Circular feature in the Sahara
- Tektite – Gravel-sized glass beads formed from meteorite impacts
- Tunguska event – 1908 air burst explosion in Siberia, Russia

== Literature ==
- V. de Michele (ed.): Proceedings of the Silica '96 Meeting on Libyan Desert Glass and related desert events, Bologna, 1997 Contents
- P.A. Clayton / L.J. Spencer: Silica Glass from the Libyan Desert, Vortrag vom 09.11.1933 online
