= Bhojapura =

- village
- Location within Madhya Pradesh Location within India
- Coordinates: 23.6653651°N 77.335314°E
- Country: India
- State: Madhya Pradesh
- District: Bhopal
- Tehsil: Berasia
- Elevation: 506 m (1,660 ft)

Population (2011)
  - Total: 715
- Time zone: UTC+5:30 (IST)
- ISO 3166 code: IN-MP
- 2011 census code: 482222

Bhojapura is a village in the Bhopal district of Madhya Pradesh, India. It is located in the Berasia tehsil.

== Demographics ==
According to the 2011 census of India, Bhojapura has 139 households. The effective literacy rate (i.e. the literacy rate of population excluding children aged 6 and below) is 65.04%.

Demographics (2011 Census)
	Total	Male	Female
Population	715	375	340
Children aged below 6 years	100	51	49
Scheduled caste	93	51	42
Scheduled tribe	41	19	22
Literates	400	257	143
Workers (all)	360	214	146
Main workers (total)	190	169	21
Main workers: Cultivators	99	96	3
Main workers: Agricultural labourers	42	33	9
Main workers: Household industry workers	5	5	0
Main workers: Other	44	35	9
Marginal workers (total)	170	45	125
Marginal workers: Cultivators	40	8	32
Marginal workers: Agricultural labourers	98	25	73
Marginal workers: Household industry workers	3	0	3
Marginal workers: Others	29	12	17
Non-workers	355	161	194
