= Maholi, Bhopal =

Maholi
- village
- Location within Madhya Pradesh Location within India
- Coordinates: 23.5330791°N 77.3266991°E
- Country: India
- State: Madhya Pradesh
- District: Bhopal
- Tehsil: Berasia
- Elevation: 494 m (1,621 ft)

Population (2011)
  - Total: 1,134
- Time zone: UTC+5:30 (IST)
- ISO 3166 code: MP-IN
- 2011 census code: 482246

Maholi is a village in the Bhopal district of Madhya Pradesh, India. It is located in the Berasia tehsil.

== Demographics ==
According to the 2011 census of India, Maholi has 212 households. The effective literacy rate (i.e. the literacy rate of population excluding children aged 6 and below) is 68.55%.

Demographics (2011 Census)
	Total	Male	Female
Population	1134	582	552
Children aged below 6 years	196	102	94
Scheduled caste	159	75	84
Scheduled tribe	8	4	4
Literates	643	398	245
Workers (all)	431	288	143
Main workers (total)	360	268	92
Main workers: Cultivators	229	199	30
Main workers: Agricultural labourers	115	59	56
Main workers: Household industry workers	1	1	0
Main workers: Other	15	9	6
Marginal workers (total)	71	20	51
Marginal workers: Cultivators	13	5	8
Marginal workers: Agricultural labourers	57	14	43
Marginal workers: Household industry workers	1	1	0
Marginal workers: Others	0	0	0
Non-workers	703	294	409
