= Lechatelierite =

Amorphous silica glass formed by lightning strike

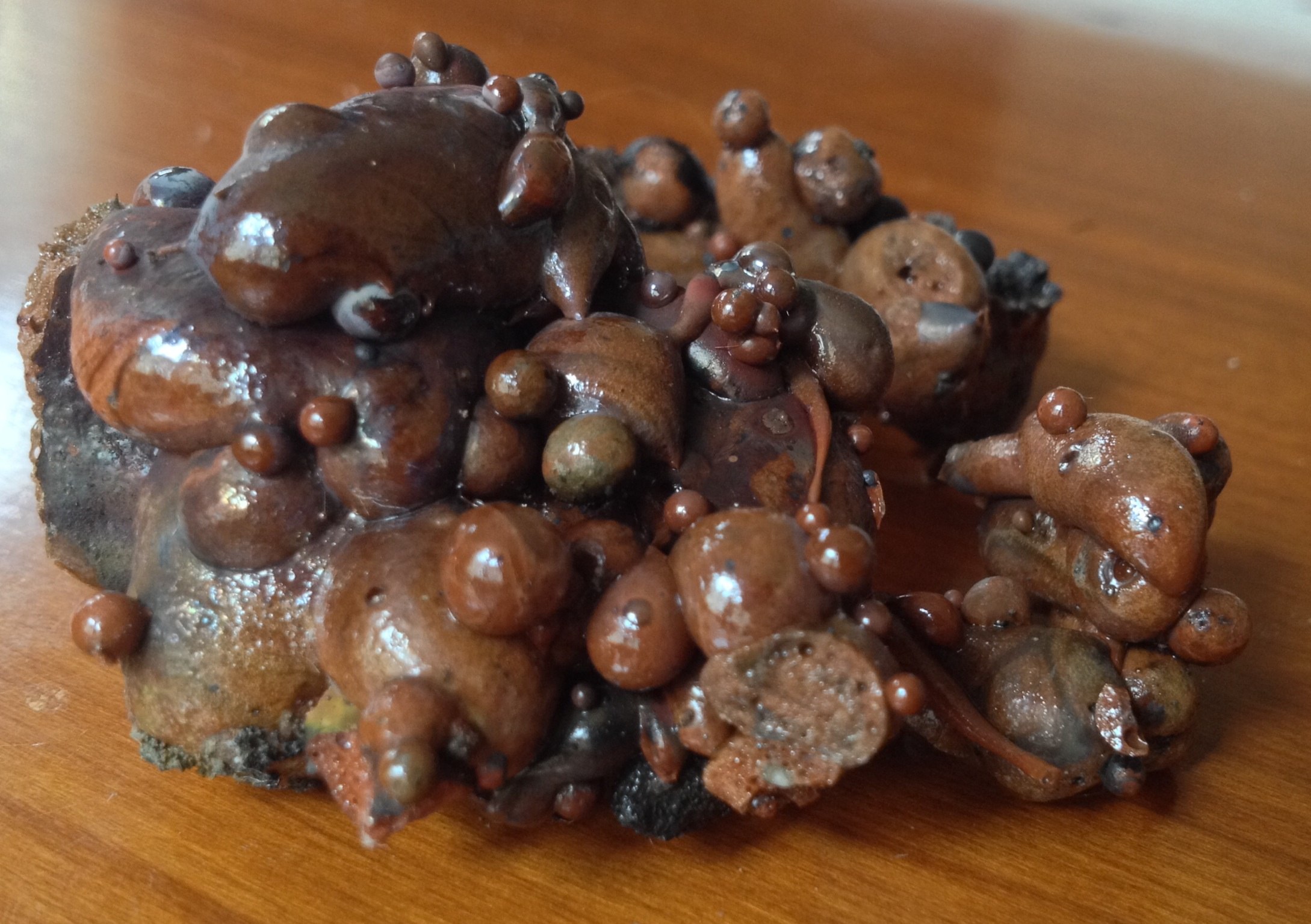
- Lechatelierite created by a high voltage power line arcing on rocky soil

General
- Category: Oxides
- Formula: SiO_{2}
- IMA symbol: Lch
- Strunz classification: 4/D.01-10
- Dana classification: 75.0.0.0
- Crystal system: Amorphous

Identification
- Formula mass: 60.08 gm
- Colour: Colourless, white
- Crystal habit: Porcelainous
- Cleavage: None
- Fracture: Conchoidal
- Mohs scale hardness: 6.5
- Luster: Vitreous
- Streak: White
- Diaphaneity: Translucent
- Density: 2.5–2.65

Lechatelierite is silica glass, amorphous SiO_{2}, non-crystalline mineraloid. It is named for the French chemist Henry Louis Le Chatelier.

== Structure ==
Lechatelierite is a mineraloid because it lacks a crystal structure. Although not a true mineral, it is often classified in the quartz mineral group.

== Formation ==
One common way in which lechatelierite forms naturally is by very-high-temperature melting of quartz sand during a lightning strike. The result is an irregular, branching, often foamy hollow tube of silica glass called a fulgurite. Not all fulgurites are lechatelierite; the original sand must be nearly pure silica.

Lechatelierite also forms under high pressure shock metamorphism during meteorite impact cratering and is a common component of a type of glassy ejecta called tektites. Most tektites are blobs of impure glassy material, but tektites from the Sahara Desert in Libya and Egypt, known as Libyan desert glass, are composed of almost pure silica, almost pure lechatelierite. High-pressure experiments have shown that shock pressures of 85 GPa are needed to produce lechatelierite in quartz grains embedded in granite.

Lechatelierite was formed during the impact of a meteorite into a layer of Coconino Sandstone at Meteor Crater in Arizona. During the rapid pressure reduction following the impact, steam expanded the newly formed lechatelierite. The shattered, expanded glass has a density lower than that of water.

Lechatelierite may also form artificially; a unique example is the trinitite produced by the melting of quartz sand during the first nuclear bomb explosion at Trinity Flats, White Sands, New Mexico.

Lechatelierite has also been observed in lunar regolith.
