= Radar remote sensing =

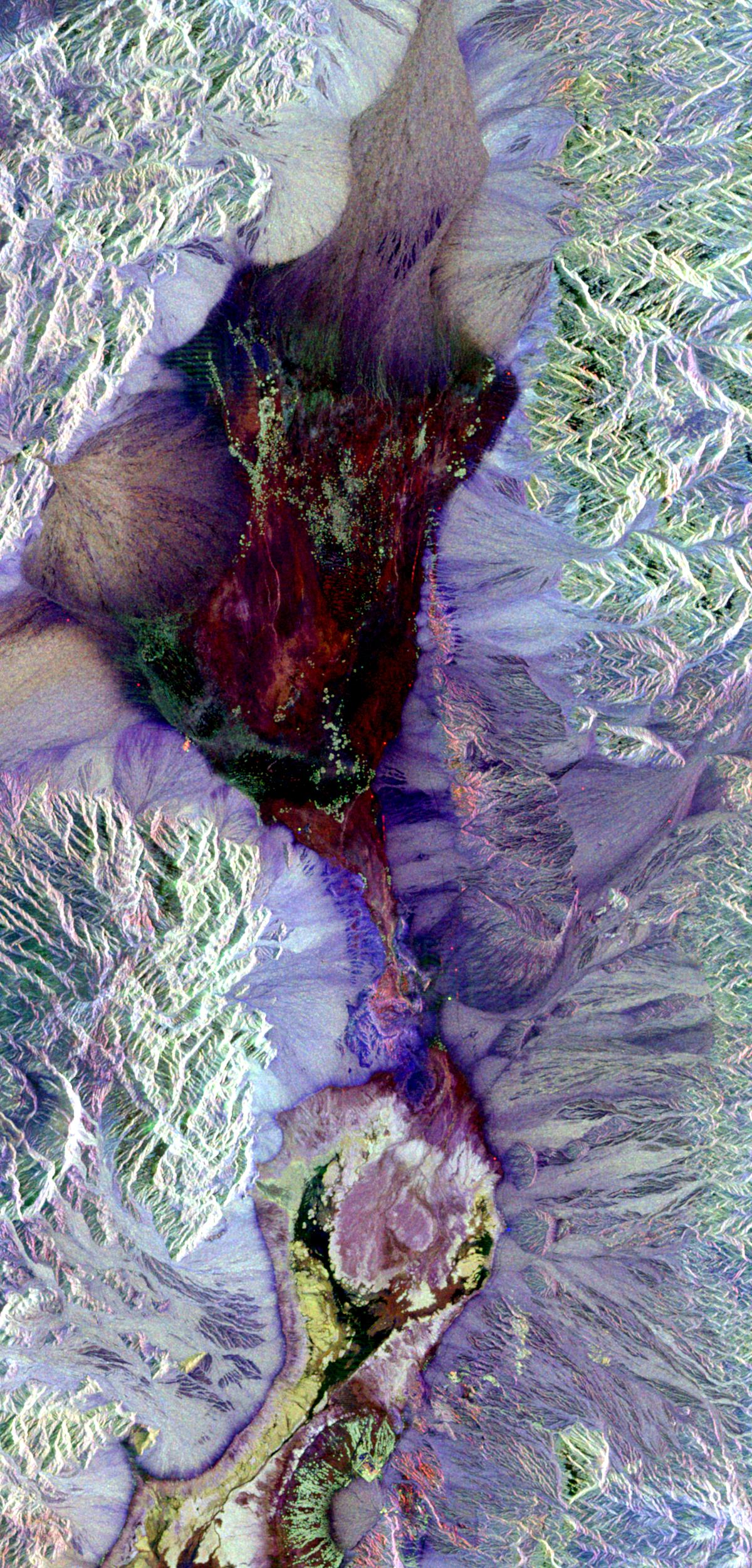
Synthetic aperture radar image of Death Valley colored using polarimetry

Radar remote sensing is a type of active remote Sensing which uses electromagnetic energy backscattered from ground targets to extract physical and dielectric behavior. It is different from passive remote sensing, the most common type, as the electromagnetic radiation (EMR) is produced by the emitters and they transmit radiation at radio wavelengths (i.e. from around 1 cm to several meters) and sensors use the measured return to infer properties of the Earth's surface. Radar remote sensing uses long-wavelength energy that penetrates through clouds and is sensitive to changes in vegetation physical structure. Thus, it has advantage in its capability of all-hour and all-weather imaging.

Its capability of all-weather imaging and specific range of EMR spectrum enables it to be applicable in Digital elevation mapping, Vegetation cover mapping, Soil mapping, Archeological applications etc. Various satellite based sensors are using this kind of technology to produce Radar based remote sensing data (see RADARSAT, TerraSAR-X, Magellan).
