= Pica glass =

Impact glass found in the Atacama Desert

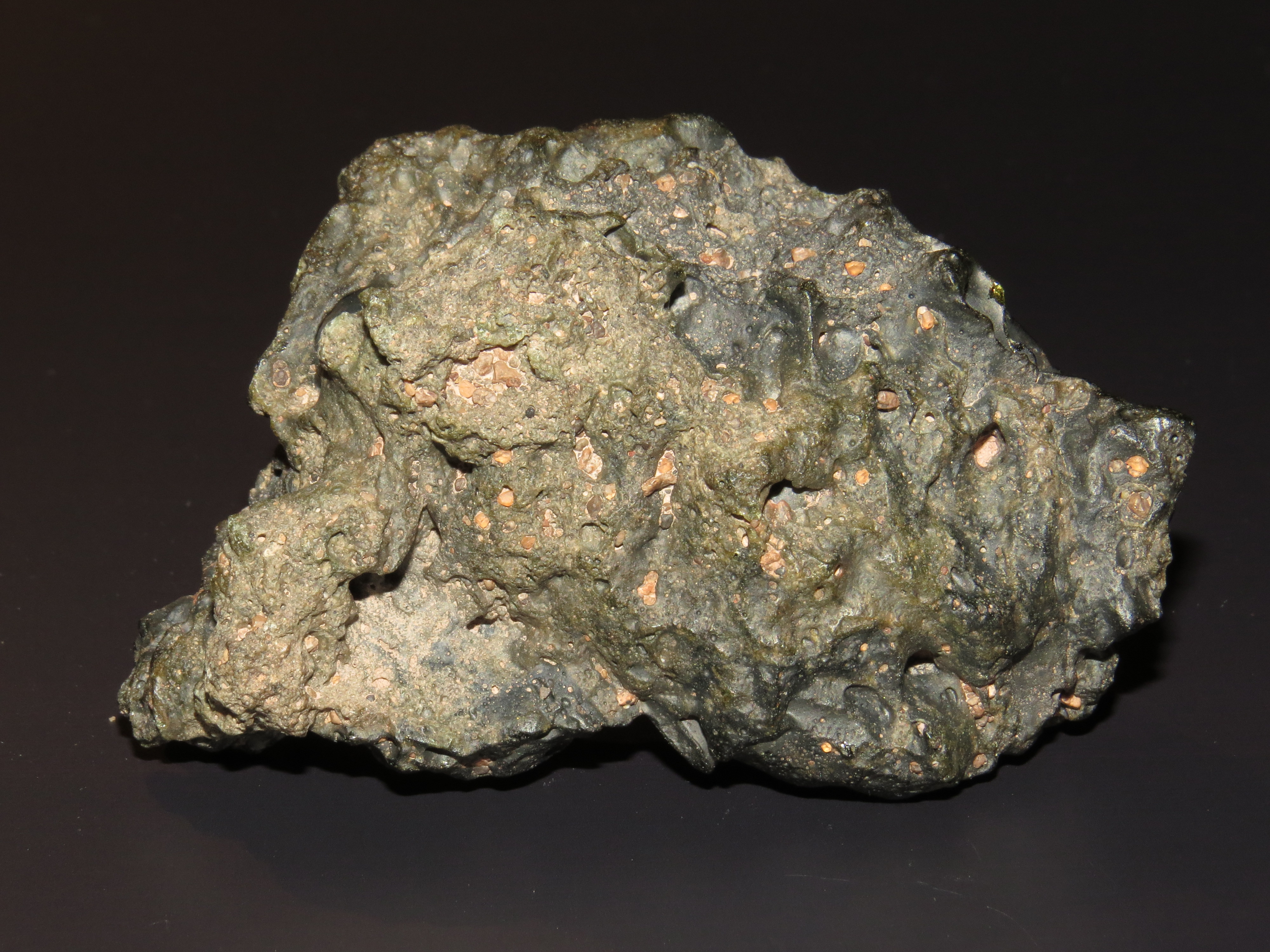
Pica glass

Pica glass, or Atacama desert glass, is a glass found along a broad 75.6 kilometer stretch of the Atacama Desert in northern Chile, including near the town of Pica, hence its name. Pica glass is notably lightweight, containing many folds, twists and flow lines, with pieces up to 50 centimeters across.

Originally, it was thought that Pica glass came about as a result of surface vitrification after the burning of salt- and vegetation-rich soils due to natural fires in the Atacama Desert during different periods in the Late Pleistocene (supported by paleomagnetic data). However, more recent research has demonstrated that Pica glass probably formed when a comet or similar extraterrestrial body entered Earth's atmosphere and exploded over the Atacama Desert during the Late Pleistocene, sometime between 14,000 and 12,000 years ago.
