= Zietrisikite =

Naturally occurring hydrocarbon compound

Zietrisikite is a naturally occurring waxy hydrocarbon compound. It is very similar to ozokerite and is found at Zietrisika, Moldavia.
