= Titanium(III) phosphide =

Names
- Other names titanium monophosphide

Identifiers
CAS Number	12037-65-9
3D model (JSmol)	Interactive image
ChemSpider	74768
ECHA InfoCard	100.031.680
EC Number	234-862-6
PubChem CID	82856
UNII	97CD8QG3BX
CompTox Dashboard (EPA)	DTXSID801014254
- InChI: InChI=1S/P.Ti Key: ADDWXBZCQABCGO-UHFFFAOYSA-N
- SMILES: P#[Ti]

Properties
Chemical formula	TiP
Molar mass	78.841 g/mol
Appearance	gray crystals
Density	4.08 g/cm^{3}, solid
Melting point	>1400°C

Structure
Crystal structure	hexagonal
- Except where otherwise noted, data are given for materials in their standard state (at 25 °C [77 °F], 100 kPa). verify (what is ?) Infobox references

Titanium(III) phosphide (TiP) is an inorganic chemical compound of titanium and phosphorus. Normally encountered as a grey powder, it is a metallic conductor with a high melting point. It is not attacked by common acids or water. Its physical properties stand in contrast to the group 1 and group 2 phosphides that contain the P^{3−} anion (such as Na_{3}P), which are not metallic and are readily hydrolysed. Titanium phosphide is classified as a "metal-rich phosphide", where extra valence electrons from the metal are delocalised.

Titanium phosphide can be prepared by the reaction of TiCl_{4} and PH_{3}.

There are other titanium phosphide phases, including Ti_{3}P, Ti_{2}P, Ti_{7}P_{4}, Ti_{5}P_{3}, and Ti_{4}P_{3}.

Titanium phosphide should not be confused with titanium phosphate or titanium isopropoxide, both of which are sometimes known by the acronym TIP.
