= Wax deposition =

Accumulation of paraffin wax on a surface

Wax deposition or paraffin deposition refers to the accumulation of paraffin wax on the surface of a substance, typically a liquid or gas. This can occur in a variety of contexts, including the production and transport of oil and natural gas, the refining of petroleum products, and the storage and transport of chemicals. For the transportation of crude oil in a pipeline, wax can deposit on to the inner surface of the pipeline, reducing the area for fluid to flow and increasing the pressure requirement for fluid to flow. To prevent wax deposition, various techniques can be used, including heating the fluid to dissolve wax back into the oil phase, adding chemicals to prevent wax formation, and using specialized equipment or a pig to remove the wax deposit from the pipe wall surface.

The term "wax deposition" should not be confused with the term "wax precipitation". The precipitation of wax refers to the phase change of the dissolved wax in liquid phase into solid wax particles. This phenomenon is governed by the thermodynamic equilibrium of wax in oil. The wax precipitation is the necessary condition, but it is not the sufficient condition for wax deposition to occur. For wax deposition to occur, the solid surface temperature for wax to be deposited on must be lower than the temperature of waxy oil solution.
