= Ganga Pipaliya =

- village
- Location within Madhya Pradesh Location within India
- Coordinates: 23.5450946°N 77.2951057°E
- Country: India
- State: Madhya Pradesh
- District: Bhopal
- Tehsil: Berasia
- Elevation: 479 m (1,572 ft)

Population (2011)
  - Total: 1,226
- Time zone: UTC+5:30 (IST)
- ISO 3166 code: MP-IN
- 2011 census code: 482242

Ganga Pipaliya is a village in the Bhopal district of Madhya Pradesh, India. It is located in the Berasia tehsil.

== Demographics ==
According to the 2011 census of India, Ganga Pipaliya has 246 households. The effective literacy rate (i.e. the literacy rate of population excluding children aged 6 and below) is 72.05%.

Demographics (2011 Census)
	Total	Male	Female
Population	1226	643	583
Children aged below 6 years	235	124	111
Scheduled caste	101	56	45
Scheduled tribe	17	9	8
Literates	714	451	263
Workers (all)	482	299	183
Main workers (total)	351	243	108
Main workers: Cultivators	236	169	67
Main workers: Agricultural labourers	91	58	33
Main workers: Household industry workers	8	7	1
Main workers: Other	16	9	7
Marginal workers (total)	131	56	75
Marginal workers: Cultivators	33	7	26
Marginal workers: Agricultural labourers	86	42	44
Marginal workers: Household industry workers	4	3	1
Marginal workers: Others	8	4	4
Non-workers	744	344	400
