= List of impact structures in North America =

World map in equirectangular projection of the impact structures on the Earth Impact Database as of November 2017 (in the SVG file, hover over a structure to show its details)

This list includes all 60 confirmed impact structures in North America in the Earth Impact Database (EID). These features were caused by the collision of large meteorites or comets with the Earth. For eroded or buried craters, the stated diameter typically refers to an estimate of original rim diameter, and may not correspond to present surface features.

North America

== Canada ==
Name	Location	Diameter (km)	Age (Ma/millions)	Coordinates
Brent	Ontario	3.8	396 ± 20	46°5′N 78°29′W
Carswell	Saskatchewan	39	115 ± 10	58°27′N 109°30′W
Charlevoix	Quebec	54	342 ± 15	47°32′N 70°18′W
Couture	Quebec	8	430 ± 25	60°8′N 75°20′W
Deep Bay	Saskatchewan	13	99 ± 4	56°24′N 102°59′W
Eagle Butte	Alberta	10	< 65	49°42′N 110°30′W
Elbow	Saskatchewan	8	395 ± 25	50°59′N 106°43′W
Gow	Saskatchewan	4	< 250	56°27′N 104°29′W
Haughton	Nunavut	23	39	75°23′N 89°40′W
Holleford	Ontario	2.35	550 ± 100	44°28′N 76°38′W
Île Rouleau	Quebec	4	< 300	50°41′N 73°53′W
La Moinerie	Quebec	8	400 ± 50	57°26′N 66°37′W
Lac à l'Eau Claire Est; Clearwater East	Quebec	26	460–470	56°04′N 74°06′W
Lac à l'Eau Claire Ouest; Clearwater West	Quebec	36	286.2 ± 2.6	56°13′N 74°30′W
Manicouagan	Quebec	100	214 ± 1	51°23′N 68°42′W
Maple Creek	Saskatchewan	6	< 75	49°48′N 109°6′W
Mistastin	Newfoundland and Labrador	28	36.4 ± 4	55°53′N 63°18′W
Montagnais	Atlantic continental shelf	45	50.50 ± 0.76	42°53′N 64°13′W
Nicholson	Northwest Territories	12.5	< 400	62°40′N 102°41′W
Pilot	Northwest Territories	6	445 ± 2	60°17′N 111°0′W
Pingualuit formerly Chubb and Nouveau-Québec	Quebec	3.44	1.4 ± 0.1	61°17′N 73°40′W
Presqu'île	Quebec	24	< 500	49°43′N 74°48′W
Tunnunik	Northwest Territories	25	~130-350	72°28′N 113°56′W
Uhackatik	Quebec	25	~390	51°12′N 64°42′W
Saint Martin	Manitoba	40	220 ± 32	51°47′N 98°32′W
Slate Islands	Ontario	30	about 450	48°40′N 87°0′W
Steen River	Alberta	25	91 ± 7	59°30′N 117°38′W
Sudbury	Ontario	250	1850 ± 3	46°36′N 81°11′W
Viewfield	Saskatchewan	2.5	190 ± 20	49°35′N 103°4′W
Wanapitei	Ontario	7.5	37.2 ± 1.2	46°45′N 80°45′W
West Hawk	Manitoba	2.44	351 ± 20	49°46′N 95°11′W
Whitecourt	Alberta	0.04	<0.0011	54°00′N 115°36′W

== Mexico ==
Name	Location	Diameter (km)	Age (Ma/millions)	Coordinates
Chicxulub	Yucatan	170	64.98 ± 0.05	21°20′N 89°30′W

== United States ==
Name	Location	Diameter (km)	Age (Ma/millions)	Coordinates
Ames	Oklahoma	16	470 ± 30	36°15′N 98°12′W
Avak	Alaska	12	< 95	71°15′N 156°30′W
Barringer	Arizona	1.19	0.049 ± 0.003	35°2′N 111°1′W
Beaverhead	Idaho, Montana	60	600	44°15′N 114°0′W
Calvin	Michigan	8.5	450 ± 10	41°50′N 85°57′W
Chesapeake Bay	Virginia	90	35.5 ± 0.3	37°17′N 76°1′W
Cloud Creek	Wyoming	7	190 ± 30	43°7′N 106°45′W
Crooked Creek	Missouri	7	320 ± 80	37°50′N 91°23′W
Decaturville	Missouri	6	< 300	37°54′N 92°43′W
Des Plaines	Illinois	8	< 280	42°3′N 87°52′W
Flynn Creek	Tennessee	3.8	360 ± 20	36°17′N 85°40′W
Glasford	Illinois	4	< 430	40°36′N 89°47′W
Glover Bluff	Wisconsin	8	< 500	43°58′N 89°32′W
Haviland	Kansas	0.015	< 0.001	37°35′N 99°10′W
Kentland	Indiana	7.24	< 97	40°45′N 87°24′W
Manson	Iowa	35	73.8 ± 0.3	42°35′N 94°33′W
Marquez	Texas	12.7	58 ± 2	31°17′N 96°18′W
Middlesboro	Kentucky	6	< 300	36°37′N 83°44′W
Newporte	North Dakota	3.2	< 500	48°58′N 101°58′W
Odessa	Texas	0.168	< 0.050	31°45′N 102°29′W
Red Wing	North Dakota	9	200 ± 25	47°36′N 103°33′W
Rock Elm	Wisconsin	6	< 505	44°43′N 92°14′W
Santa Fe	New Mexico	6-13	<1200	35°45′N 105°56′W
Serpent Mound	Ohio	8	< 320	39°2′N 83°24′W
Sierra Madera	Texas	13	< 100	30°36′N 102°55′W
Upheaval Dome	Utah	10	< 170	38°26′N 109°56′W
Wells Creek	Tennessee	12	200 ± 100	36°23′N 87°40′W
Wetumpka	Alabama	7.6	~83	32°31′N 86°10′W

== Unconfirmed impact structures ==
The following craters are officially considered "unconfirmed" because they are not listed in the Earth Impact Database. Due to stringent requirements regarding evidence and peer-reviewed publication, newly discovered craters or those with difficulty collecting evidence generally are known for some time before becoming listed. However, entries on the unconfirmed list could still have an impact origin disproven.

Name	Location	Diameter (km)	Age (years)	Coordinates	Probability
Alamo bolide impact	Nevada	unknown	367 million		
Bow City	Alberta	8 km	70 million	50°25′N 112°16′W	
Corossol	Quebec	4 km	2.6 million	50°03′N 66°23′W	
Decorah crater	Iowa	5.6	470 million	43°18′49.73″N 91°46′20.04″W	2 (probable)
Gatun structure	Panama	2.7–3.0	20 million	09°06′N 79°47′W	2 (probable)
Pantasma	Nicaragua	10	1 million	13.37°N 85.95°W	4 (not probable)
Jeptha Knob	Kentucky	4.3	425 million	38°11′N 85°07′W	2 (probable)
Panther Mountain	New York state	10	375 million	42°03′N 74°24′W	2 (probable)
Snows Island	South Carolina	11	unknown	33°49′N 79°22′W	2 (probable)
Toms Canyon	New Jersey	22	35 million	39°08′N 72°51′W	2 (probable)
Victoria Island structure	California	5.5	37–49 million	37.889925°N 121.534672°W	2 (probable)
Weaubleau-Osceola	Missouri	15–20	325.0 ± 15.0 million	37°59′N 93°38′W	2 (probable)
Brushy Creek Feature	Louisiana	2	11,000 - 30,000 years	30.768°N 90.735°W	2 (probable).

== See also ==
- Impact craters
- Impact events
- Bolides and Meteorites
- Earth Impact Database – primary source
- Traces of Catastrophe book from Lunar and Planetary Institute - comprehensive reference on impact crater science
