= Spencer Creek =

Spencer Creek may refer to:

- Spencer Creek (Ontario), a stream in Canada
- Spencer Creek (Dardenne Creek), a stream in Missouri
- Spencer Creek (Lake of the Ozarks), a stream in Missouri
- Spencer Creek (Salt River), a stream in Missouri
- Spencer Creek (Uwharrie River tributary), a stream in Montgomery County, North Carolina
- Spencer Creek (South Branch French Creek tributary), a stream in Erie County, Pennsylvania
