= Geography of Saskatchewan =

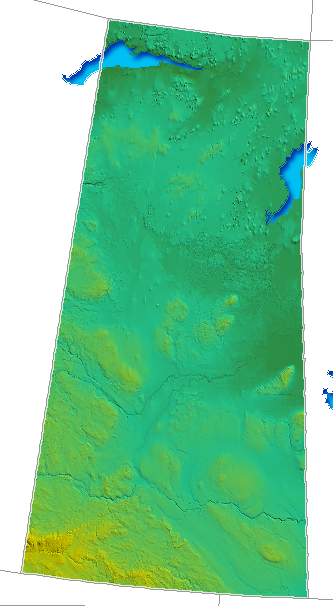
- Continent: North America
- Region: Western Canada; Canadian Prairies
- Coordinates: 49°00′00″N 101°21′41″W— 60°00′N 110°00′W
- Area: Ranked 7th among provinces
  - Total: 651,036 km^{2} (251,366 sq mi)
  - Land: 90.8%
  - Water: 9.2%
- Coastline: 0 km (0 mi)
- Borders: Alberta, Manitoba, Northwest Territories, Montana and North Dakota
- Highest point: Cypress Hills; 1,392 metres (4,567 ft)
- Lowest point: Lake Athabasca; 213 metres (699 ft)
- Longest river: Saskatchewan River
- Largest lake: Lake Athabasca; 7935 km^{2}

The geography of Saskatchewan is unique among the provinces and territories of Canada in some respects. It is one of only two landlocked regions (Alberta is the other) and it is the only region whose borders are not based on natural features like coasts, lakes, rivers, or drainage divides. The borders of Saskatchewan, which make it very nearly a trapezoid, were determined in 1905 when it became a Canadian province. Saskatchewan has a total area of 651,036 square kilometres (251,366 sq mi) of which 591,670 km^{2} (228,450 sq mi) is land and 59,366 km^{2} (22,921 sq mi) is water.

The province's name comes from the Saskatchewan River, whose Cree name is: kisiskatchewani sipi, meaning "swift flowing river".

Saskatchewan can be divided into three regions: grassland (part of the Great Plains) in the south, aspen parkland in the centre, and forest in the north. The forest region lies partly on the northern part of the Great Plains and partly on the Canadian Shield. Its principal rivers are the Assiniboine River, and North and South Saskatchewan Rivers.

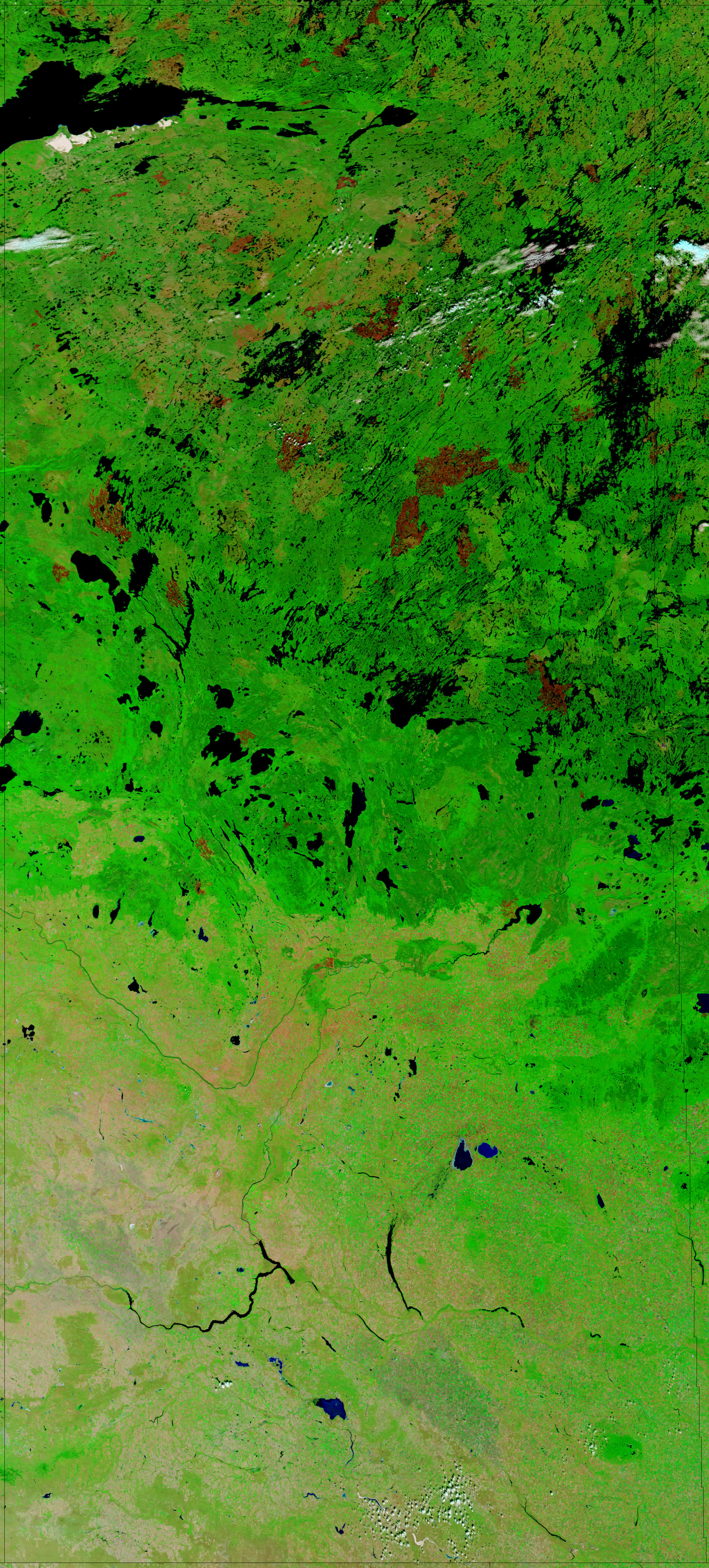
NASA image of Saskatchewan and a portion of Manitoba. Dark to light rust coloured areas in the north are burn scars from forest fires

Saskatchewan is bordered on the west by Alberta, on the north by the Northwest Territories, on the east by Manitoba, and on the south by the U.S. states of Montana and North Dakota.

== Physical geography ==
Saskatchewan is very close to a trapezoid. Its western border runs concurrent with the 4th meridian or the 110°W longitude, separating Saskatchewan from the province of Alberta. This border extends in length for 1,225 kilometres (761 mi) and was established in 1905 when both provinces were formed.

Saskatchewan's eastern border includes minor measurement errors from the 1880s, so that it does not lie perfectly on the 102°W longitude, but rather it is slightly west of that meridian from 60°N parallel to 55°47'N, then slightly east of that until the Canada–United States border – an irregular line (rather than a straight one) for its 1,225-kilometre (761 mi) distance. When Saskatchewan was formed in 1905, Manitoba and the District of Keewatin were the neighbouring areas to the east. Manitoba was enlarged in 1912 north to the 60th parallel, becoming Saskatchewan's only eastern neighbour. This remaining section of the border was determined by survey between 1961 and 1972.

Saskatchewan's southern border with the United States sits approximately on the 49th parallel, as agreed in the Treaty of 1818—though minor measurement errors during the 1870s International Boundary Survey result in some variance between the actual Canada–United States border and the 49th parallel. This boundary was not formally established until the 1867 survey. This border extends 627 kilometres (390 mi) across southern Saskatchewan.

The Northwest Territories is north of the 60th parallel which forms the northern border of the province. This border extends 445 kilometres (277 mi) across northern Saskatchewan. The aforementioned measurement errors in the 1880s surveys place the Saskatchewan / Manitoba border approximately 400 metres (440 yd) west of the 102nd meridian and the accurately measured Northwest Territories / Nunavut border, just missing a true quadripoint of the Saskatchewan / Manitoba/Northwest Territories / Nunavut borders.

== Historical geography ==
Archaeologists have dated the first human settlements to 9,500 BC. The four groups inhabiting the area at the time of the first European contact were the Cree, Assiniboine, Salteaux, and Dene. Henry Kelsey of the Hudson's Bay Company is considered the first European person to see this area. The earliest trading posts were made by the French; however, the first permanent settlement was established at Cumberland House in 1774 by the HBC. In addition, several more ports were set up by British fur traders among the area's waterways. The forested area of the Canadian Shield was the favoured area for early settlement, and the economy was heavily dependent on hunting and trapping.

In 1870, the Hudson's Bay Company sold Rupert's Land and ceded its rights to the Canadian Government. The region became a part of the North-West Territories. The majority of the Indigenous inhabitants in the North-West Territories made treaties with the British Crown (via Canadian government representatives) in the 1870s and were settled on Indian reserves. Additional native peoples and Métis, led by Louis Riel, rebelled between 1884 and 1885 in the North-West Rebellion and were suppressed.

The arrival of settlements and the rail lines also brought agricultural economies and development in the Central Lowlands Area. The Great Plains or Palliser Triangle area to the south was mainly used for ranching economies. In the beginning of the 20th century, Saskatchewan farmers created cooperative organizations to maintain grain marketization. During the drought and the Great Depression of the 1930s, the population decreased as immigration nearly ended and numerous families left. During World War II, conservation programs and the increased demand for grain revived the economy.

== Climate ==
Köppen climate types in Saskatchewan

Being in the centre of North America, Saskatchewan is far removed from the moderating effects of any large body of water and therefore has a temperate continental climate, Köppen climate classification types BSk, Dfb and Dfc. Hot to warm summers and cold winters mean that the annual temperature range can be up to 65 °C. On average, Saskatchewan has 211 days per year when the temperature drops below freezing. Plough winds, Supercell hail or high precipitation rain storms, and tornadoes are eventful summer occurrences. Midale reached 45 °C (113 °F) on July 5, 1937, one of the highest recorded temperatures in Canada.

Compared to average values from all thirteen Canadian provinces and territories, Saskatchewan is the sunniest province or territory year round (2206 hours per year), has the second-lowest annual snowfall (145 centimetres (57 in)), the fourth-lowest total precipitation (428 millimetres (16.9 in)) and the second-hottest summer (22.5 °C (72.5 °F)). The number of frost-free days ranges from 95 days in the north (Prince Albert, for example) to as high as 124 days in the south (Estevan).

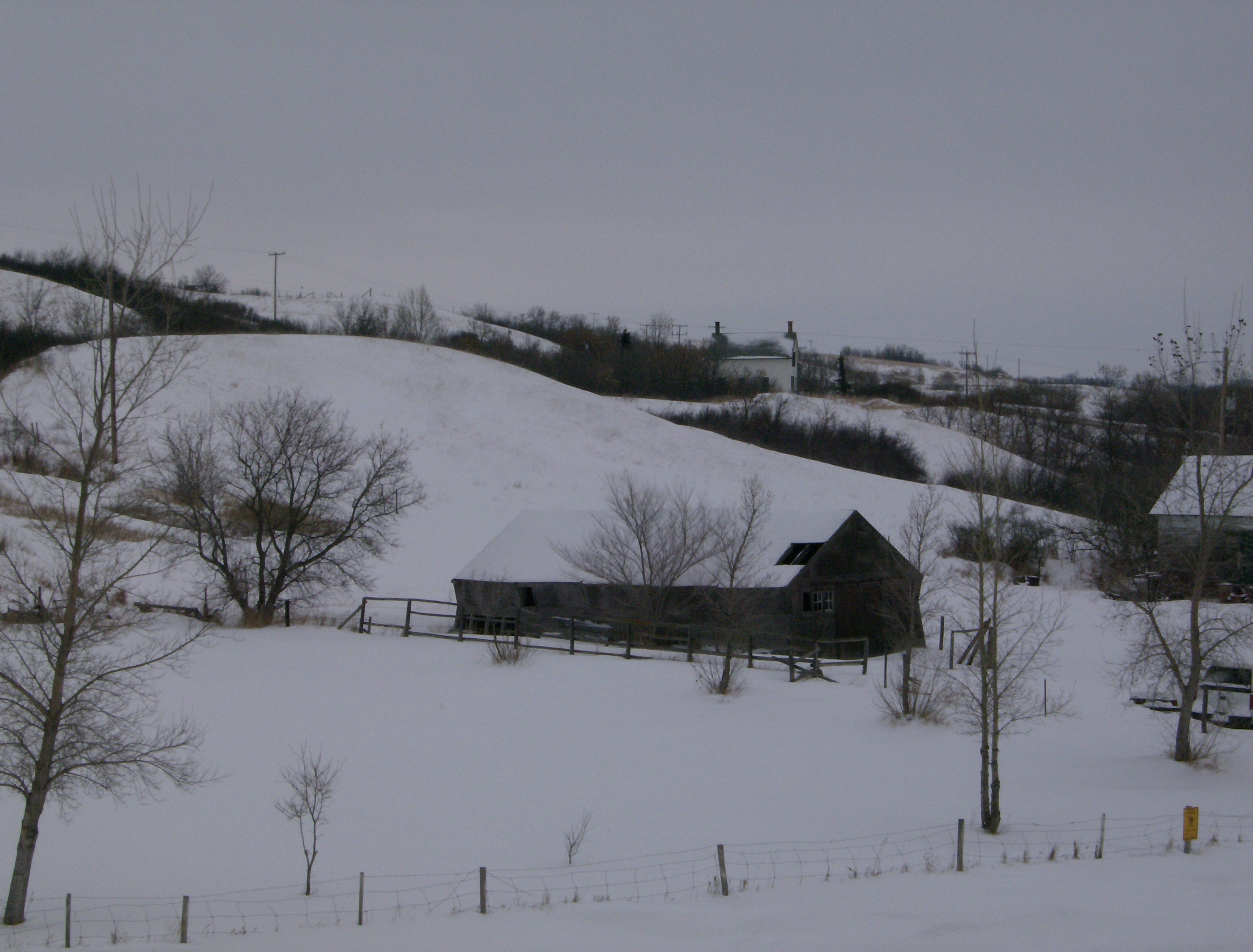
View of winter in the Qu'Appelle Valley

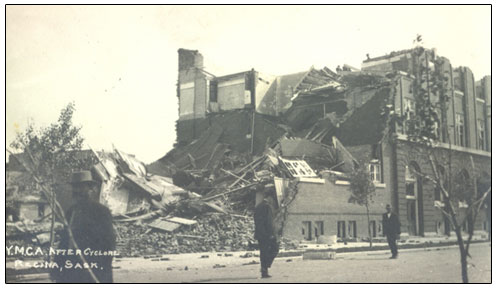
1912 Regina Cyclone after-effects

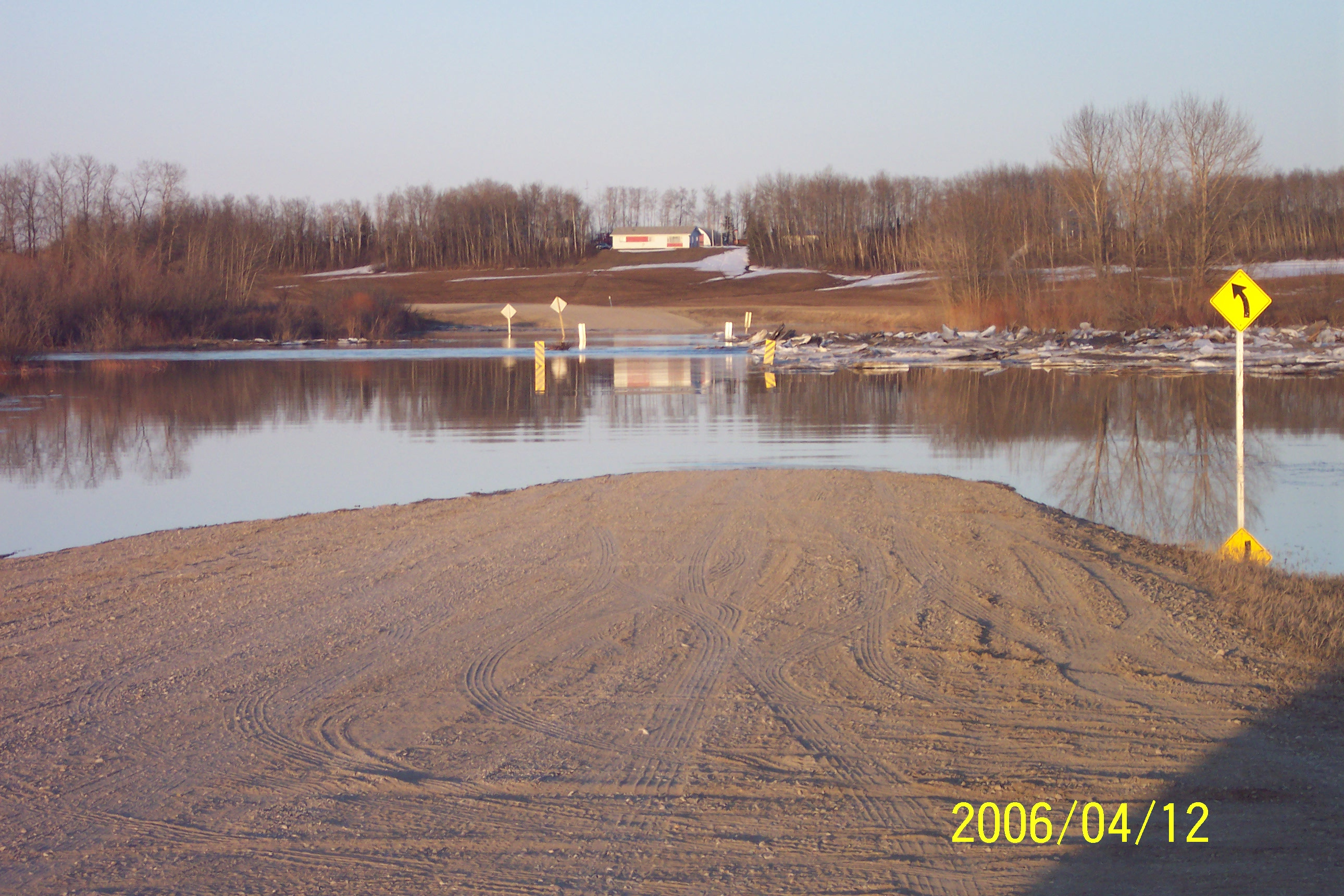
Carrot River spring flooding

=== Climate data ===
Average daily maximum and minimum temperatures for selected cities in Saskatchewan
City	July (°C)	July (°F)	January (°C)	January (°F)
Maple Creek	27/11	81/52	−5/−16	23/4
Estevan	27/13	81/55	−9/−20	16/−4
Weyburn	26/12	79/54	−10/−21	14/−6
Moose Jaw	26/12	79/54	−8/−19	18/−2
Regina	26/11	79/52	−10/−22	14/−8
Saskatoon	25/11	77/52	−12/−22	10/−8
Melville	25/11	77/52	−12/−23	10/−9
Swift Current	25/11	77/52	−7/−17	19/1
Humboldt	24/11	75/52	−12/−23	10/−9
Melfort	24/11	75/52	−14/−23	7/−9
North Battleford	24/11	75/52	−12/−22	10/−8
Yorkton	24/11	75/52	−13/−23	9/−9
Lloydminster	23/11	73/52	−10/−19	14/−2
Prince Albert	24/11	75/52	−13/−25	9/−13

=== Climate change ===
The effects of climate change in Saskatchewan are now being observed in parts of the province. There is evidence of reduction of biomass in Saskatchewan's boreal forests (as with those of other Canadian prairie provinces) is linked by researchers to drought-related water stress, stemming from global warming, most likely caused by greenhouse gas emissions. While studies, as early as 1988 (Williams, et al., 1988) have shown climate change will affect agriculture, whether the effects can be mitigated through adaptations of cultivars, or crops, is less clear. Resiliency of ecosystems may decline with large changes in temperature. The provincial government has responded to the threat of climate change by introducing a plan to reduce carbon emissions, "The Saskatchewan Energy and Climate Change Plan", in June 2007.

== Urban areas ==
Saskatchewan's capital and second largest city is Regina. Its most populous city is Saskatoon.

Ten largest SK Urban Areas by population
Urban Area	2011	2006	2001	1996
Saskatoon	222,189	202,340	193,647	186,067
Regina	193,100	179,246	178,225	180,400
Prince Albert	35,129	34,138	34,291	34,777
Moose Jaw	33,274	32,132	32,131	32,973
Yorkton	15,669	15,038	15,107	15,154
Swift Current	15,503	14,946	14,821	14,890
North Battleford	13,888	13,190	13,692	14,051
Estevan	11,054	10,752	10,242	10,752
Weyburn	10,484	9,433	9,534	9,534
Lloydminster	9,772	8,118	7,840	7,636

Two largest SK municipalities by population
municipalities	2011	2006	2001
Corman Park No. 344	8,354	8,349	8,043
Edenwold No. 158	4,167	3,611	2,917

"Urban Areas", as defined by Statistics Canada, are areas of continuous population density, ignoring municipal borders.

== Biosphere ==
=== Flora ===
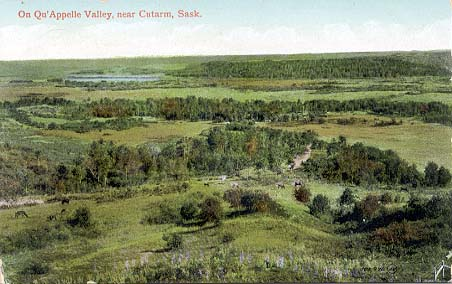
View of Qu'Appelle Valley

The native flora of the Saskatchewan includes vascular plants, plus additional species of other plants and plant-like organisms such as algae, lichens and other fungi, and mosses. Non-native species of plants are recorded as established outside of cultivation in Saskatchewan, of these some non-native species remain beneficial for gardening, and agriculture, where others have become invasive, noxious weeds. Saskatchewan is committed to protecting species at risk in Canada. The growing season has been studied and classified into plant hardiness zones depending on length of growing season and climatic conditions. Biogeographic factors have also been divided into ecoregions and floristic kingdoms across Saskatchewan, and natural vegetation varies depending on elevation, moisture, soil and weather. The study of ethnobotany uncovers the interrelation between humans and plants and the various ways people have used plants for economic reasons, food, medicine and technological developments.

The Government of Saskatchewan has declared three indigenous plants as provincial symbols.

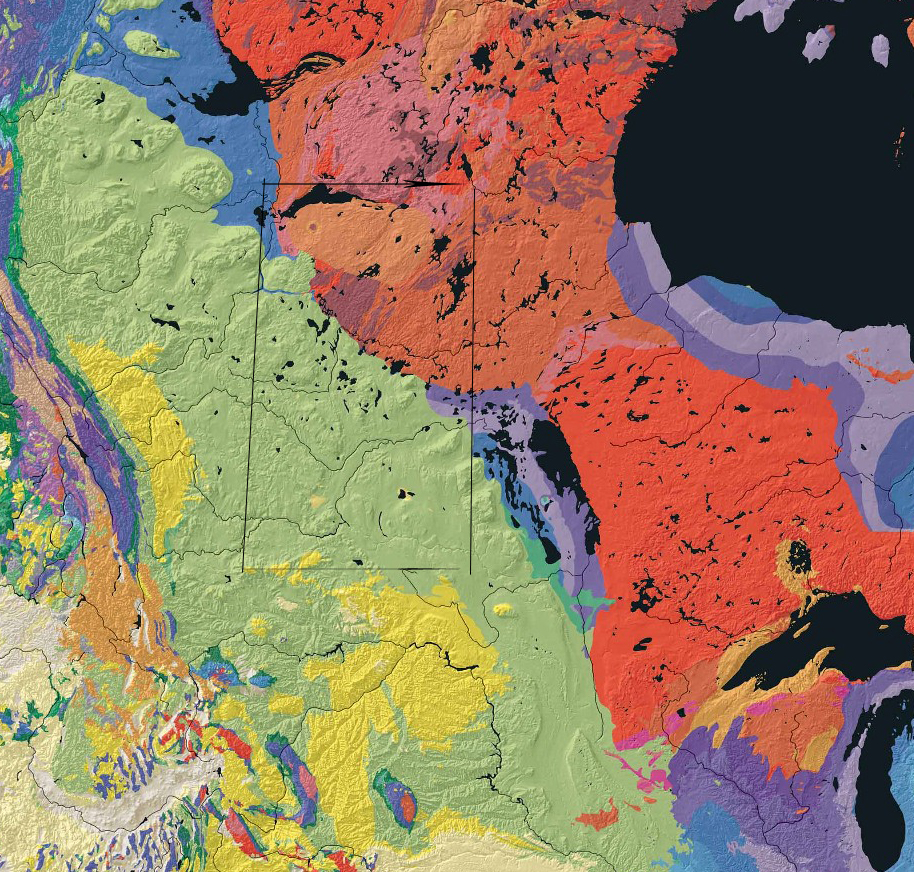
Saskatchewan Terrain _{within rectangle} Red area Canadian Shield Green area Central Lowlands Southwest corner Great Plains

=== Fauna ===
The fauna of Saskatchewan include many land and aquatic species. From the multiplicity of invertebrates and vertebrates two have been chosen as symbols of Saskatchewan, the white-tailed deer and the sharp-tailed grouse. Cenozoic vertebrate fossils reveal the geological evolution of the Interior Plains and its prehistoric biogeography. Today, Saskatchewan's ecosystems range from the sub-Arctic tundra of the Canadian Shield in north Saskatchewan to aspen parkland, and grassland prairie. Fauna inhabit areas unique to their own specific and varied breeding, foraging and nesting requirements. With a large land and water area, and small population density, the ecoregions of Saskatchewan provide important habitat for many animals, both endangered and not.

Naturalists observing wildlife have enumerated shrinking and growing wildlife populations. They advocate programs and methods to preserve or re-introduce endangered species and identify programs of control for outbreaks of wildlife populations.

A broad diversity of wildlife habitats are preserved as parks and reserves protecting the feeding and breeding grounds of protected and indigenous fauna of Saskatchewan.

== Hydrography ==
The total area of freshwater is 59,366 km^{2}. There are two main river basins, the Nelson and Churchill River Basins, both of which drain into Hudson Bay.

Qu'Appelle and Souris, the North and South Saskatchewan, confluence is east of Prince Albert becoming the Saskatchewan which are all a part of the Nelson river basin. The Churchill River connects lakes and streams through the lower portion of the Canadian Shield. Rupert's Land a historical political division of Canada comprised all lands of the Hudson Bay drainage system between the years 1670 to 1870.

Frenchman River does not flow east to Hudson Bay, but rather south to the Missouri River, which is part of the Missouri river basin catchment area. The Mackenzie River basin of north Saskatchewan flows north draining into the Arctic Ocean, which belongs to the Mackenzie river basin drainage area.

There are over 10,000 lakes across Saskatchewan, the main lake region being north of the tree line in the Canadian Shield.

Saskatchewan's largest lake is Lake Athabasca which sits astride the Saskatchewan – Alberta border. The second in size is Reindeer Lake which is located on the Saskatchewan – Manitoba border. Other lakes of notable size would be Wollaston, Cree, Frobisher, and Lac La Ronge. The deepest water point 220 metres (720 ft) is located in Reindeer Lake at the Deep Bay Structure site which was created by a meteor impact.

Saskatchewan is also home to preserved wetlands which are partially submerged areas of land.

Saskatchewan's waterways also contain bogs, as well as the salt water lakes. Quill Lake is Canada's largest saltwater lake, Chaplin Lake is a Western Hemispheric Shorebird Reserve Network and Little Manitou, an endorheic lake, is a popular tourist resort. Brine shrimp fisheries have existed on sodium magnesium sulphate lakes such as Chaplin, Frederick, Ingebright, and Little Manitou lakes.

== Provincial and national parks ==
Saskatchewan has 36 provincial parks that provide for recreational use or preserve wilderness, special environments, or sites of historic importance.

The province is also home to two of Canada's 36 national parks. Grasslands National Park, which covers 907 square kilometres (350 sq mi) in southernmost part of the province, was established in 1981. The other is Prince Albert National Park covering 3,874 square kilometres (1,496 sq mi) in central Saskatchewan, which was established in 1927.

== Economic geography ==
The economy of Saskatchewan has been associated with agriculture resulting in the moniker Bread Basket of Canada and Bread Basket of the World. According to the Government of Saskatchewan, approximately 95% of all items produced in Saskatchewan, depend on the basic resources available within the province. Various grains, livestock, oil and gas, potash, uranium, wood and their spin off industries fuel the economy.

Saskatchewan's GDP in 2006 was approximately C$45.922 billion.

== Gallery ==
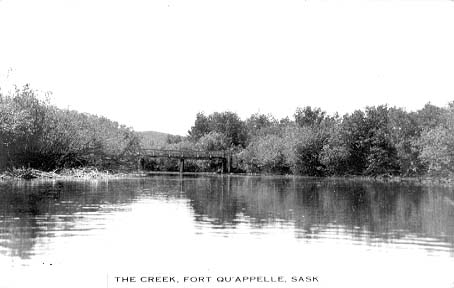
The Qu'Appelle River

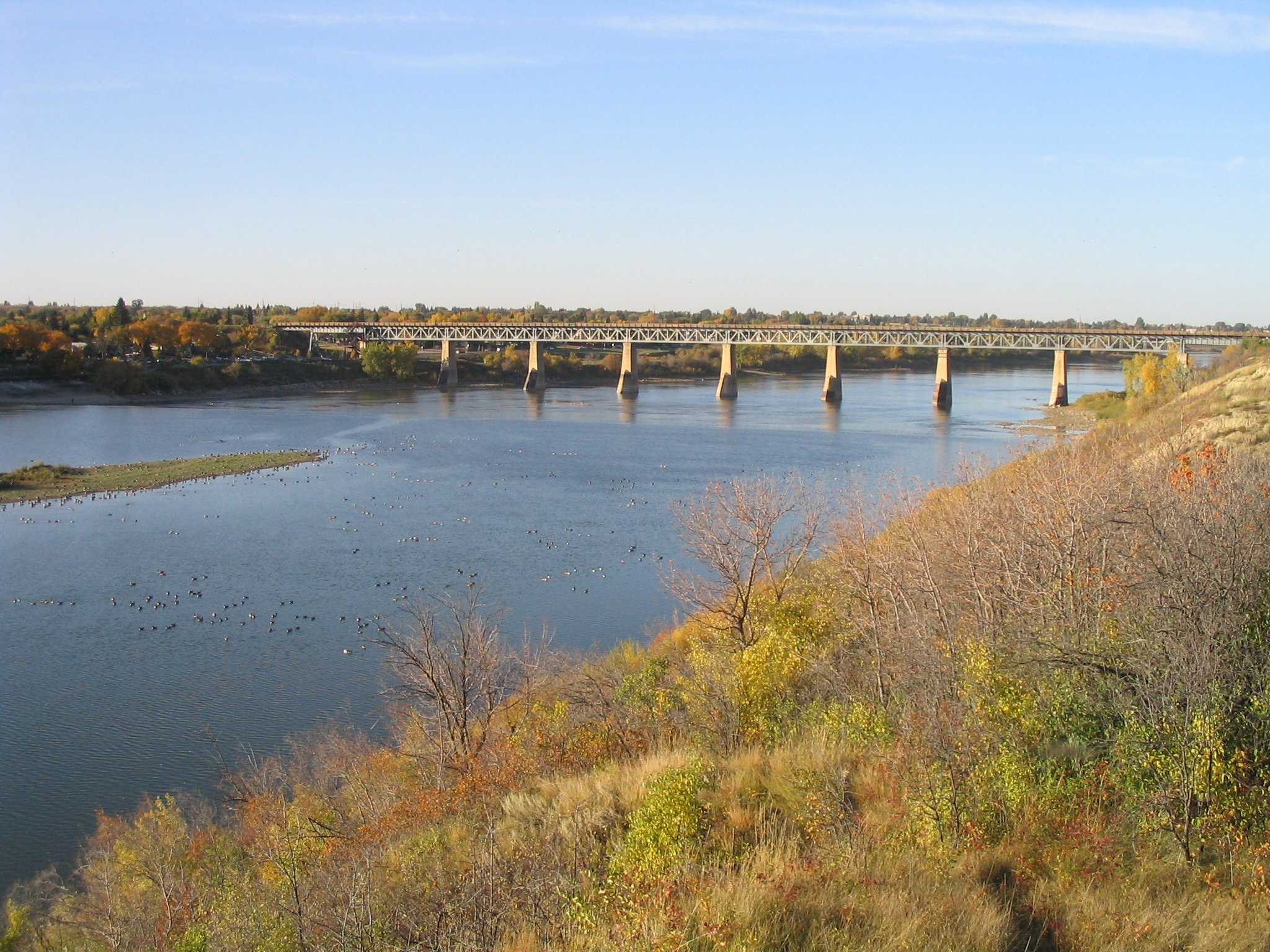
The South Saskatchewan River

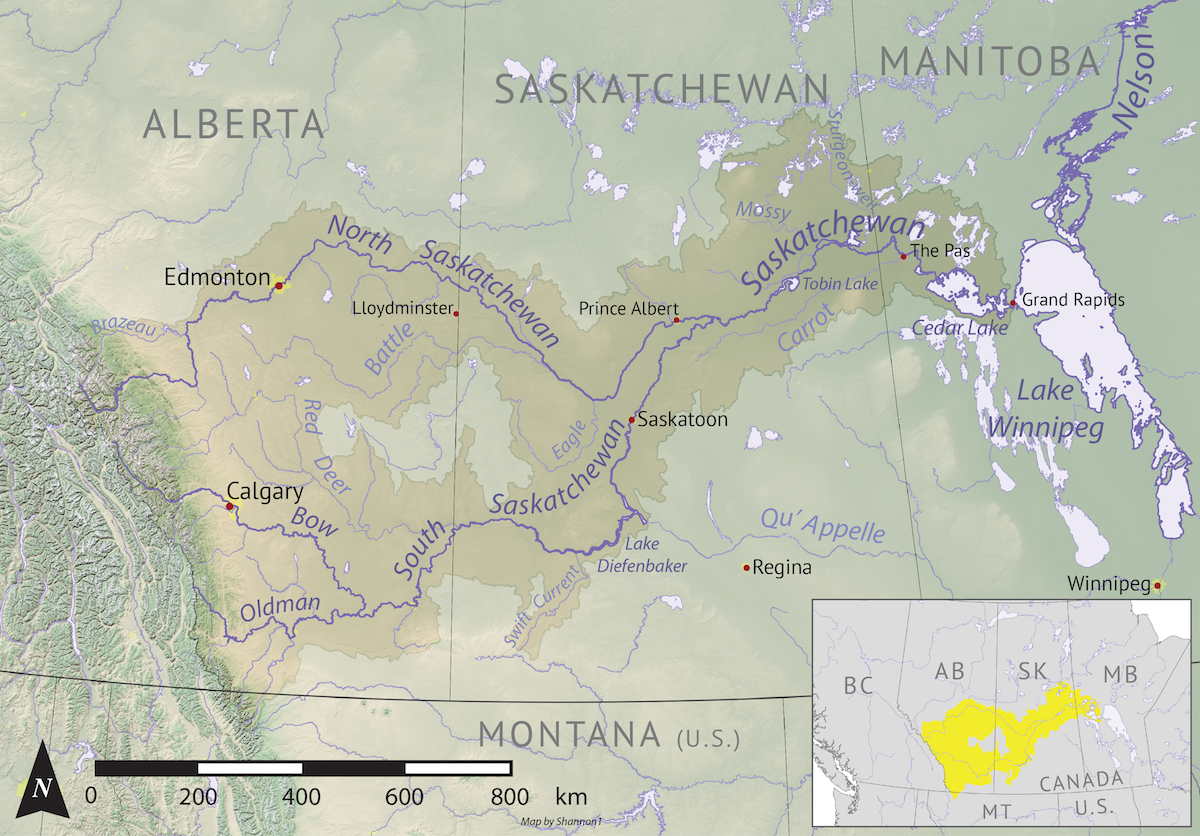
The Saskatchewan River drainage basin

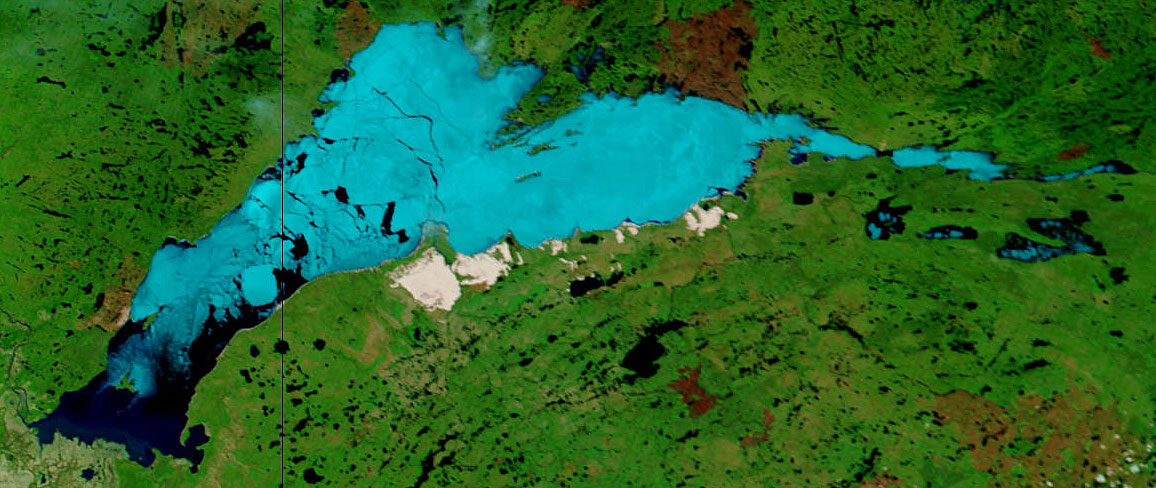
Lake Athabasca

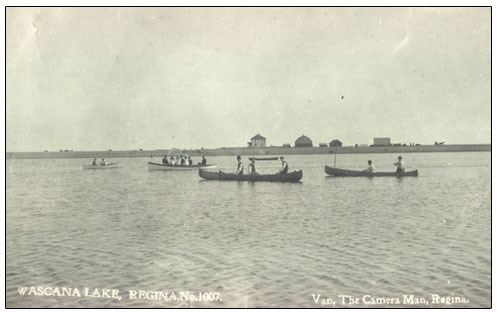
Wascana Lake

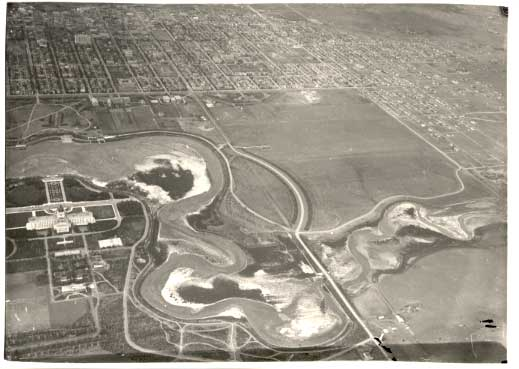
Aerial view Wascana Lake

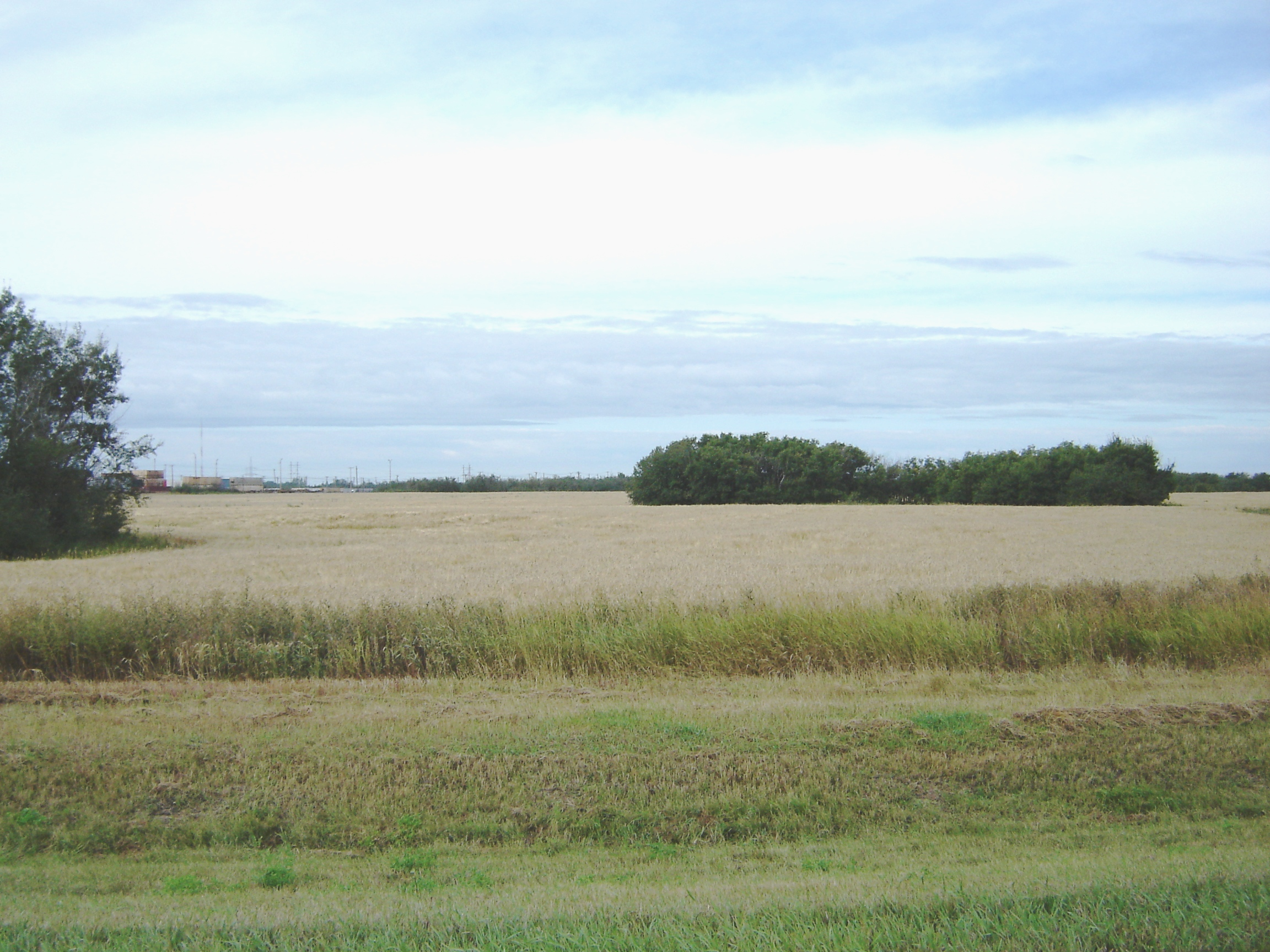
Grain field in the aspen parkland near Saskatoon

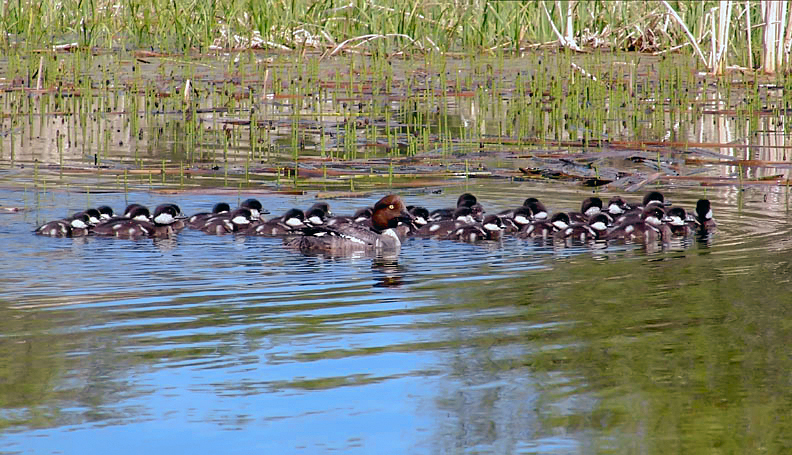
Saskatchewan wetlands

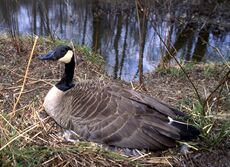
Canada goose in the Saskatchewan wetlands

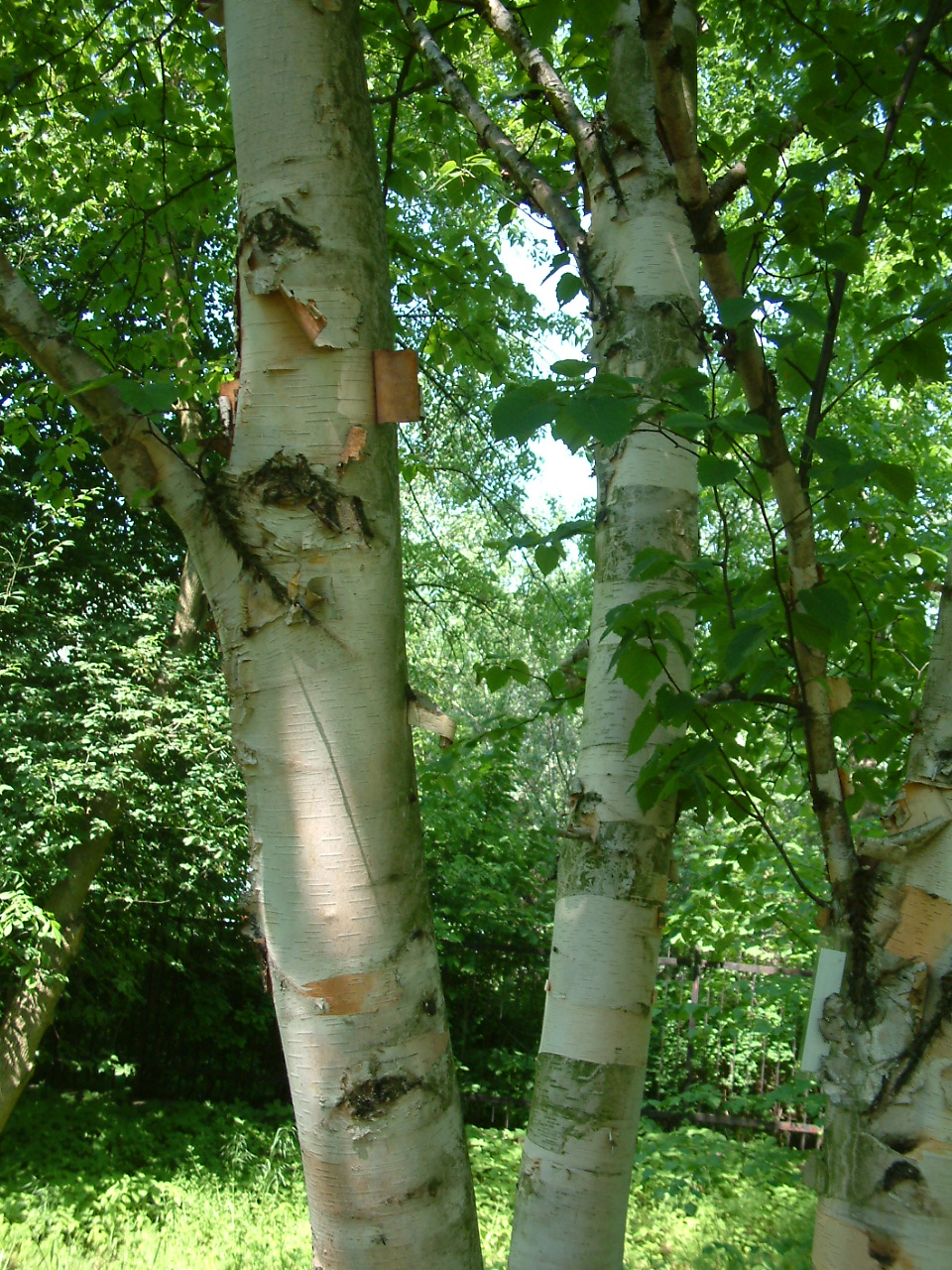
Paper birch, Saskatchewan's provincial tree

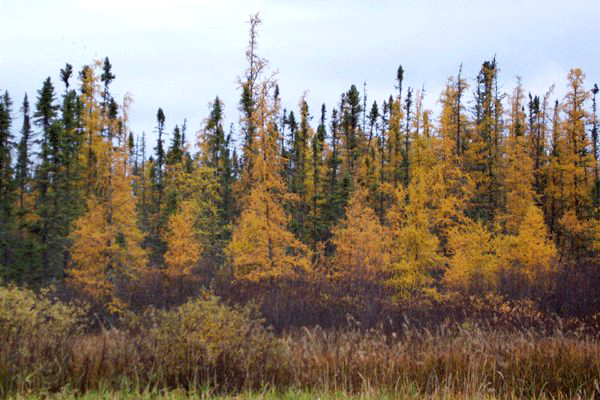
Tamarack larch in fall colors, with black spruce

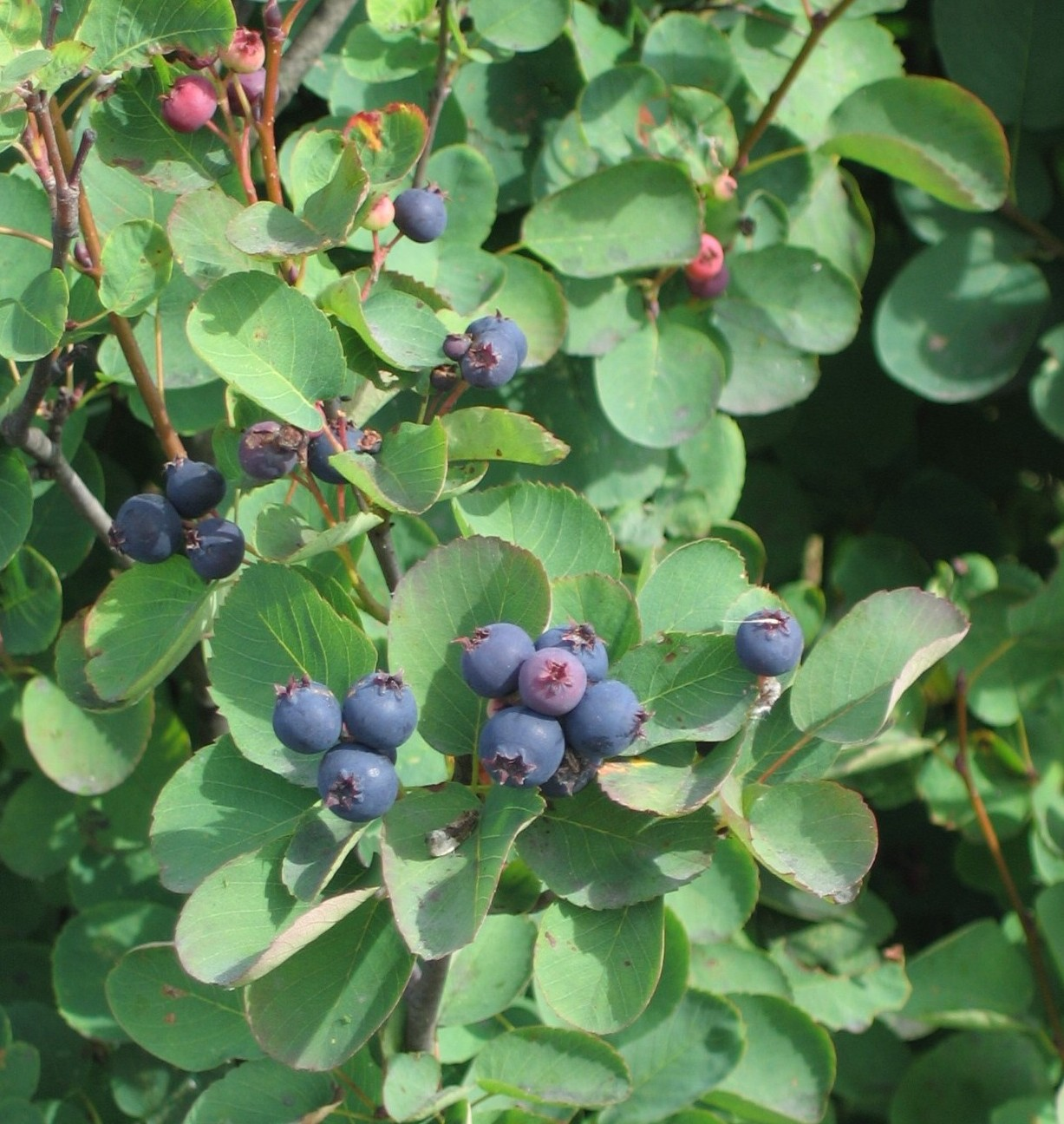
Saskatoon berry

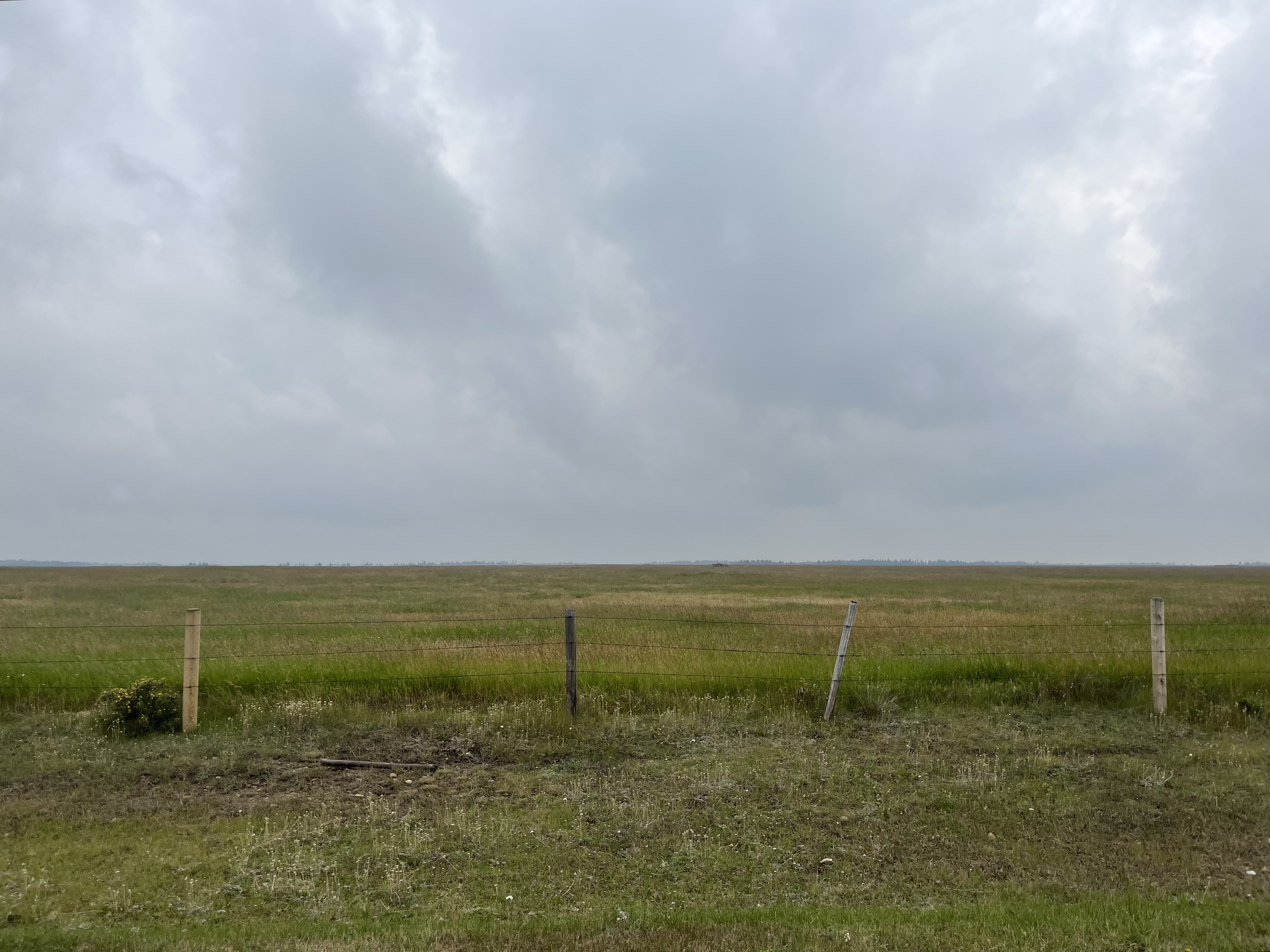
The highest point in Saskatchewan, looking north

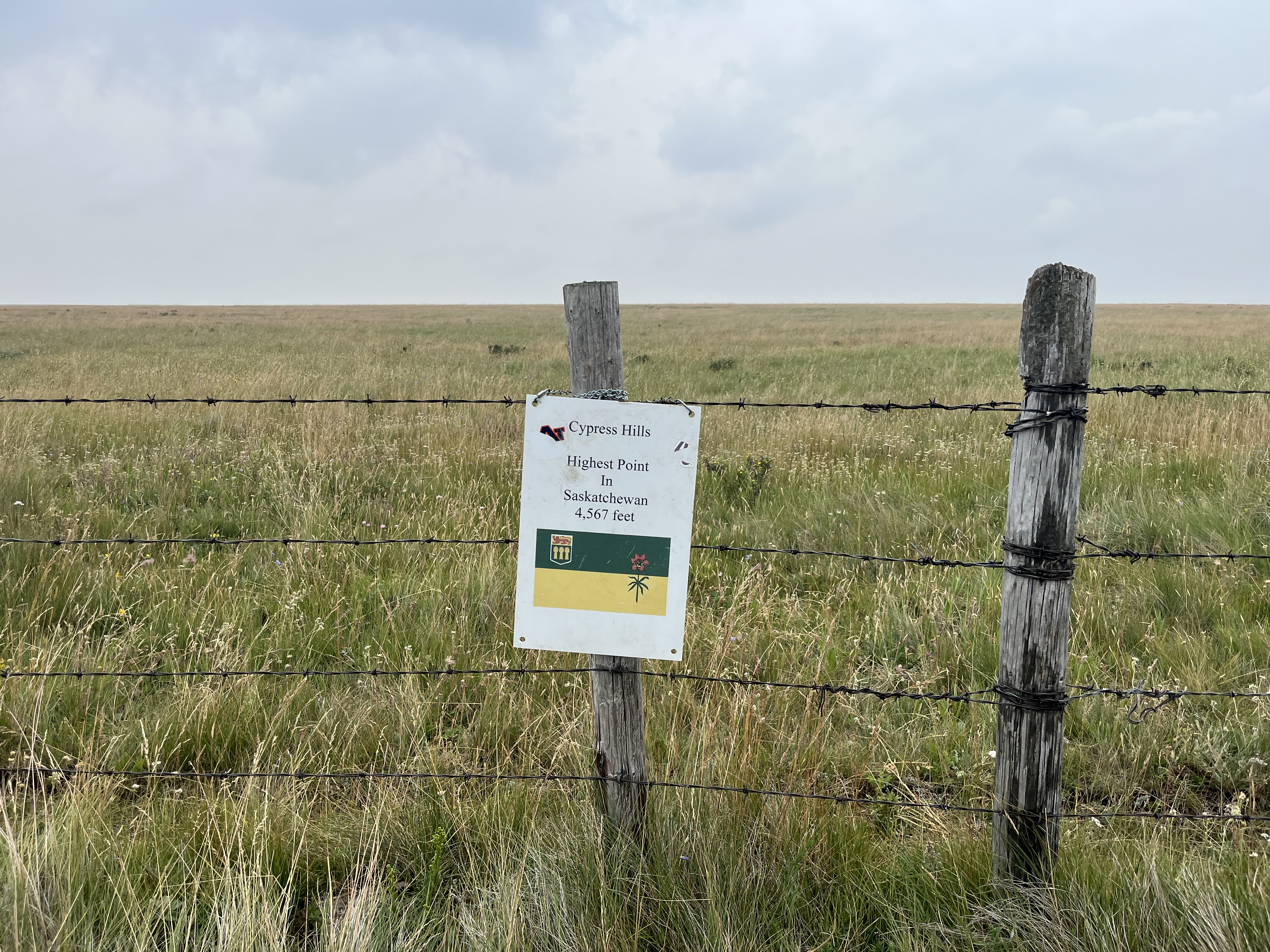
The highest point in Saskatchewan, looking south

== See also ==
- The Saskatchewan Act
- Geography of Canada
