= Warren Township, Camden County, Missouri =

Township in the US state of Missouri

Warren Township
- Township
- Coordinates: 37°55′04″N 092°41′41″W
- Country: United States
- State: Missouri
- County: Camden

Area
  - Total: 73.43 sq mi (190.17 km^{2})
  - Land: 72.36 sq mi (187.41 km^{2})
  - Water: 1.07 sq mi (2.76 km^{2}) 1.45%
- Elevation: 1,145 ft (349 m)

Population (2000)
  - Total: 2,466
  - Density: 34/sq mi (13.2/km^{2})
- FIPS code: 29-77038
- GNIS feature ID: 0766394

Warren Township is one of eleven townships in Camden County, Missouri, USA. As of the 2000 census, its population was 2,466.

Warren Township was established in 1841, and most likely named after Joseph Warren.

== Geography ==
Warren Township covers an area of 73.42 square miles (190.2 km^{2}) and contains no incorporated settlements. It contains seven cemeteries: Baker, Claiborne, Dickerson, Garrison, Lodge, Stone and Webster.

Trout Glen Pool is within this township. The streams of Arnold Branch, Bank Branch, Forbes Branch, Niangua River, Spencer Creek and Weaver Creek run through this township.

== Transportation ==
Warren Township contains one airport or landing strip, Camdenton Memorial Airport.
