= Gow crater =

Impact crater in Saskatchewan, Canada

Gow Crater
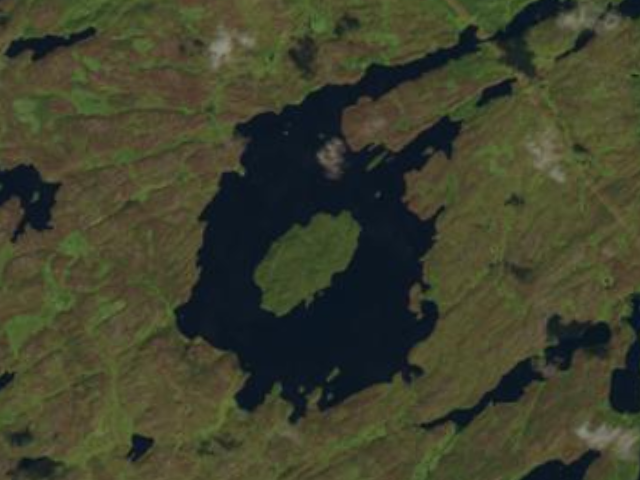
- Gow Lake - Landsat OLI 37

- Location within Saskatchewan Location within Canada
- Location: Saskatchewan, Canada; 56°27′5″N 104°28′5″W

Impact crater structure
- Confidence: Confirmed
- Diameter: 5 km (3 mi)
- Age: c. 250 million years
- Exposed: Yes
- Drilled: No

Gow Crater is an impact crater in Saskatchewan, Canada. It is 5 kilometres (3 mi) in diameter and the age is estimated to be less than 250 million years (Triassic or later). The crater contains a classic crater lake (Gow Lake) with an island (Calder Island) formed by the central uplift. It is the smallest known crater in Canada with an uplift structure.

The crater is unique in that it is the only preserved example of a transitional impact structure on Earth. This is characterized by a crater having relatively smooth walls and a floor partly or completely covered by debris slumped from the crater walls. The only other existing example is in Australia, however it is extremely deteriorated. Due to this, the rock forming the crater bed is a unique form of breccia existing nowhere else on Earth. This rock was formed when existing rock was liquified during the meteor impact.

The larger Deep Bay crater, formed during the Cretaceous, is around 90 kilometres (56 mi) east of Gow crater. The Carswell impact structure, which also formed during the Cretaceous, is to the northwest of Gow Crater.

== Gow Lake ==
Gow Lake — the lake that fills the crater — has a surface area of 1,744.4 hectares (4,311 acres) and a shoreline that is 47 kilometres (29 mi) long. At the centre of the lake is the recursive Calder Island. Fish commonly found in the lake include burbot, lake trout, lake whitefish, northern pike, and walleye.

The lake, and by extension, the crater, were named after James Richard Gow. He was killed in action during World War 2 on 25 April 1945.

== See also ==
- List of impact structures in North America
- List of lakes of Saskatchewan
- Geology of Saskatchewan
