= Parallel structures =

Parallel structures may refer to:

- 38th parallel structures, a series of carboniferous craters of the United States, approximately lying on the 38th parallel north
- Parallelism (grammar), a way to organize parts of a sentence.
