= Crooked Creek crater =

Impact crater in Missouri

- Faults and other tectonic structures related to the Crooked Creek crater on a shaded relief map

- Location within the United States Location within Missouri
- Location: Crawford County, Missouri, United States; 37°50′N 91°23′W

Impact crater structure
- Confidence: Confirmed
- Diameter: 4.3 mi (7 km)
- Age: 320 ± 80 Ma (Mississippian)
- Exposed: Yes
- Drilled: No
- Bolide type: see 38th parallel structures
- Topo map: USGS Cook Station

Crooked Creek is an impact crater in Crawford County, Missouri, United States.

It is 4.3 miles (7 km) in diameter and the age is estimated to be 320 ± 80 million years old (Mississippian). The crater is exposed to the surface.

This is one of the 38th parallel structures, a series of circular depressions stretching across the central United States, thought to possibly be the result of a serial impact.

== See also ==
- Decaturville crater
- Weaubleau structure
