= Decaturville, Missouri =

- Unincorporated community
- Decaturville's position in Missouri
- Coordinates: 37°54′27.1″N 92°41′59.7″W
- Country: United States
- State: Missouri
- County: Camden
- Township: Warren
- Founded: 1838
- Elevation: 1,060 ft (323 m)
- Time zone: UTC-6 (Central (CST))
  - Summer (DST): UTC-5 (CDT)
- Area code: 479
- GNIS feature ID: 716778

Decaturville is an unincorporated community in Warren Township, Camden County, Missouri, United States. It is located on Route 5 approximately seven miles south-southeast of Camdenton. The Camden-Laclede county line is less than one mile south of the community.

The community was founded in 1854 and is named after Commodore Stephen Decatur Jr., (1779 – 1820), an American naval officer notable for his heroism in actions at Tripoli, Libya in the First Barbary War, the Second Barbary War, and in the War of 1812.

== See also ==
- Decaturville crater
