= Deep Bay crater =

Impact crater in Saskatchewan, Canada

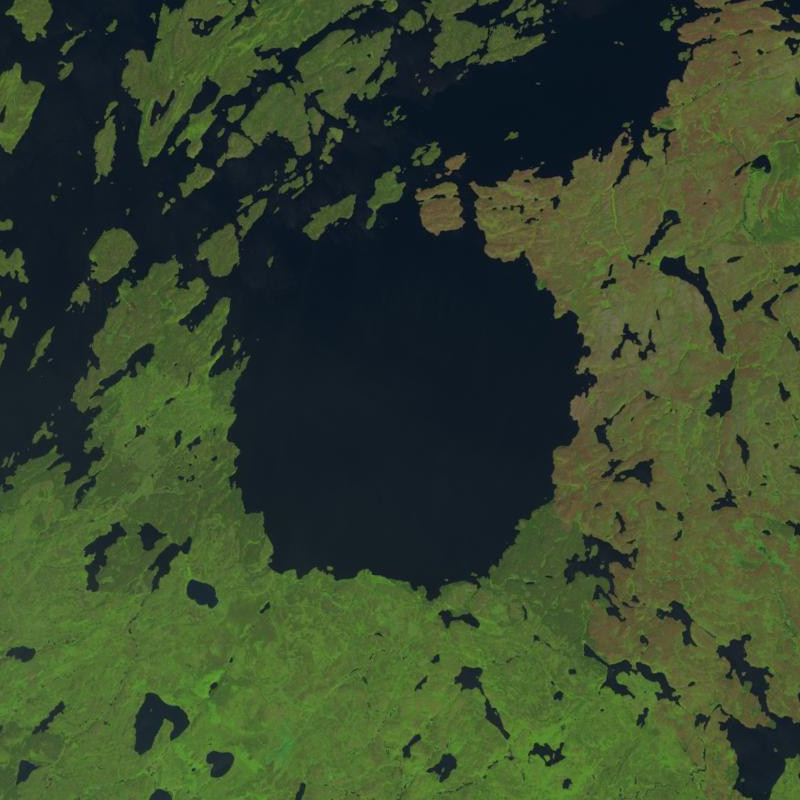
- Landsat image, approximately 23.5 km wide, centered on the structure

- Location within Saskatchewan Location within Canada
- Location: Saskatchewan, Canada; 56°24′N 102°59′W

Impact crater structure
- Confidence: confirmed
- Diameter: 13 kilometres (8 mi)
- Age: 99 ± 4 million years old (Cretaceous)
- Exposed: No
- Drilled: Yes

Deep Bay is a bay near the south-western tip of Reindeer Lake in Saskatchewan, Canada. The bay is strikingly circular and very deep (220 m) in an otherwise irregular and shallow lake. It is the deepest body of water in Saskatchewan.

The bay was formed in a 13 km wide impact crater. The age of the crater is estimated to be 99 ± 4 million years (Cretaceous).

The smaller Gow crater, of Triassic age, is approximately 90 km west of Deep Bay crater. The Carswell impact structure, also of Cretaceous age, is to the northwest of Deep Bay and Gow.

Reindeer Lake with the Deep Bay Crater in the foreground

== See also ==
- List of impact structures in North America
- Geology of Saskatchewan
