= Viewfield crater =

Impact crater in Saskatchewan, Canada

- Location within Saskatchewan Location within Canada
- Location: Williston Basin, Division No. 1, Saskatchewan, Saskatchewan, Canada; 49°35′N 103°4′W

Impact crater structure
- Confidence: Confirmed
- Diameter: 2.5 km (1.6 mi)
- Age: 190 ± 20 Ma; Late Triassic or Early Jurassic
- Exposed: No
- Drilled: Yes

Viewfield is an impact crater in Saskatchewan, Canada. It is 2.5 kilometres (1.6 mi) in diameter and the age is estimated to be 190 ± 20 million years (Early Jurassic or Late Triassic). The crater is not exposed at the surface.

== See also ==
- List of impact structures in North America
- Geology of Saskatchewan
