= Maple Creek crater =

Subterranean meteorite crater in Saskatchewan, Canada

- Location within Saskatchewan Location within Canada
- Location: Williston Basin, Division No. 4, Saskatchewan, Saskatchewan, Canada; 49°48′N 109°6′W

Impact crater structure
- Confidence: Confirmed
- Diameter: 6 km (3.7 mi)
- Age: <75 Ma; Late Cretaceous or younger
- Exposed: No
- Drilled: Yes

Maple Creek is a subterranean meteorite crater in Saskatchewan, Canada. It is 6 km (3.7 mi) in diameter and the age is estimated to be less than 75 million years (Late Cretaceous or younger). The crater is buried beneath younger sediment and cannot be seen at the surface.

== See also ==
- List of impact structures in North America
- Geology of Saskatchewan
