= Elbow crater =

Meteorite crater in Saskatchewan, Canada

Coordinates: 50°59′N 106°43′W

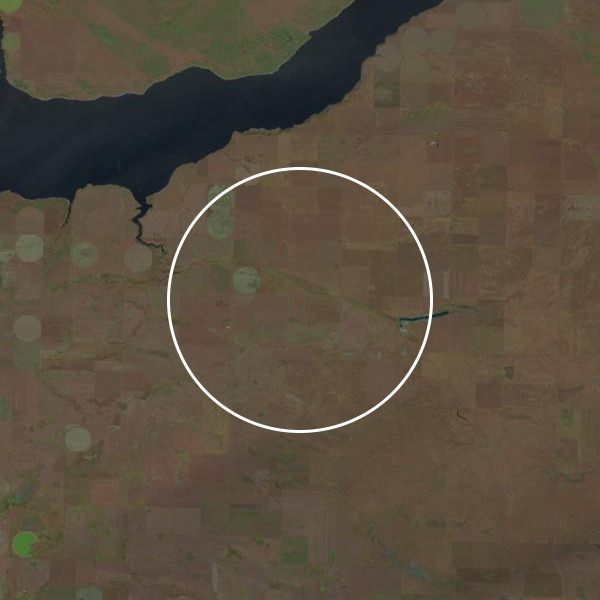
Circle shows the approximate rim of Elbow crater. There is no surface expression of the structure.

Elbow is a meteorite crater just north of the village of Riverhurst in Saskatchewan, Canada.

The crater is 8 kilometres (5.0 mi) in diameter with an age estimated to be 395 ± 25 million years (during the Devonian Period). The crater is buried beneath younger sediments and is not exposed at the surface.

== See also ==
- List of impact structures in North America
- Geology of Saskatchewan
