= Newporte crater =

Impact crater in North Dakota

Coordinates: 48°58′N 101°58′W

- Location within the United States Location within North Dakota

Impact crater structure
- Confidence: Confirmed
- Diameter: 3.2 kilometres (2.0 mi)
- Age: < 500 Ma
- Exposed: No
- Drilled: Yes

Newporte is a meteorite crater in North Dakota, United States.

It is 3.2 km in diameter and the age is estimated to be less than 500 million years (Cambrian or younger). The crater is not exposed at the surface.
