= 38th parallel structures =

American Midwest landscape depressions

Structure	Coordinates
Hicks Dome	37.5°N 88.3°W
Avon	37.8°N 90.2°W
Crooked Creek	37.8°N 91.4°W
Decaturville	37.9°N 92.7°W
Hazelgreen	37.7°N 92.4°W
Weaubleau-Osceola	38.0°N 93.6°W
Rose Dome	37.7°N 95.7°W

The 38th parallel structures, also known as the 38th parallel lineament, are a series of seven circular depressions or deformations stretching 700 kilometres (430 mi) across southern Illinois and Missouri and into eastern Kansas, in the United States, at a latitude of roughly 38 degrees north. Estimated at 300 million years old, three are believed to be impact events from meteorites, but other structures are possibly remnants of volcanos.

== History ==
Rampino and Volk (1996) postulated that these structures could be the remains of a serial meteorite strike during the late Mississippian or early Pennsylvanian periods (320 ± 10 Ma). Difficulty in determining the age of many of the structures and doubts about the exogenic origins of several of them leave some geologists skeptical of this hypothesis. As of 2016, only two of the structures, Crooked Creek (320 ± 80 Ma) and Decaturville (< 300 Ma), both in Missouri, are listed as confirmed impact craters in the Earth Impact Database.

There is evidence that at least some of the features, such as Hicks Dome in Illinois, are volcanic in origin. These features are associated with faults and fractured rock, and are accompanied by igneous rocks and mineral deposits. Hicks Dome is a structural dome which has its central Devonian core displaced upward some 4,000 feet (1,200 m) in relation to the surrounding strata. The dome has small associated igneous dikes around its flanks.

Interest in the possibility of serial impacts on Earth was piqued by observations of comet Shoemaker–Levy 9 impacting on Jupiter in 1994. It has been estimated, however, that the likelihood of such an event occurring on Earth is vanishingly small because the Earth's weaker gravitational field is much less able than Jupiter's to pull a speeding object close enough to be torn apart by tidal forces. However, evidence of serial impacts on the Moon, whose gravitational field is even weaker, can be seen in several chains of craters on the lunar surface.

== See also ==
- Impact event
- Roche limit
- List of possible impact structures on Earth
