= Cloud Creek crater =

Impact crater in Wyoming, United States

- Location within the United States Location within Wyoming
- Location: Casper Arch, Natrona County, Wyoming, United States; 43°7′N 106°45′W

Impact crater structure
- Confidence: Confirmed
- Diameter: 7 km (4.3 mi)
- Age: 190 ± 30 Ma; Early or Middle Jurassic or Late Triassic
- Exposed: No
- Drilled: Yes

Cloud Creek crater is an impact crater in Wyoming, United States. The crater is located in Natrona County, about 48 miles (77 km) northwest of Casper, near the center of a geological feature known as the Casper Arch.

The Cloud Creek structure is circular with a current diameter of about 7 kilometres (4.3 mi), and it is buried beneath about 1,200 metres (3,900 ft) of Mesozoic rocks. The age of the structure is estimated to be 190 ± 20 million years, which means that it formed as the result of an impact during the early part of the Jurassic Period. This impact feature is not exposed at the surface, but it is known only through wells drilled for oil and gas. First reported by Donald Stone, Cloud Creek is a circular structure documented using several 2D reflection seismic lines of fair to good quality, gravity, magnetic and borehole data. The structure has a central core of brecciated, fractured and faulted rocks uplifted up to 520 m relative to the normal stratigraphy outside the structure. The core is surrounded by an annular trough and a detached fault-bounded rim anticline. The rim anticline defines the 7 km diameter of the structure. The structure was compressed and upthrown during the Laramide compression. Morphometric parameters of the structure are consistent with known impact structures. The core is associated with a positive gravity anomaly. Magnetic data could not be interpreted.

== History ==
The first published report of the Cloud Creek Structure was in 1985. However, an impact origin was probably first proposed sometime after 1973 by a Casper geologist named Jack Wroble A total of ten wells have been drilled for oil and gas within the boundaries of the Cloud Creek structure between 1955 and 1999. Two wells have been drilled within the central peak, four wells within the encircling skirt, and four through the outer rim structure.
