= Weaubleau structure =

Geological formation in Missouri, U.S.

Coordinates: 37°59′N 93°38′W

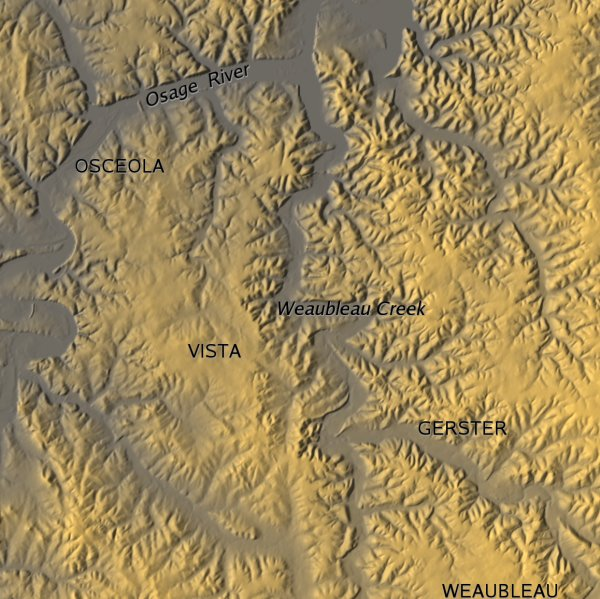
- The 12-mile (19 km) circular Weaubleau structure is discernible in the drainage patterns of this shaded-relief image.

- Location within the United States Location within Missouri

Impact crater structure
- Confidence: Probable
- Age: 335 and 340 million years

This diagram illustrates the large-scale structures interpreted in the shaded-relief image.

The Weaubleau structure is a probable meteorite impact site in western Missouri near the towns of Gerster, Iconium, Osceola, and Vista. It is believed to have been caused by a 1,200-foot (370 m) meteoroid between 335 and 340 million years ago during the middle Mississippian Period (Latest Osagean to Earliest Meramecian). It is listed by the Impact Field Studies Group as a "probable" impact structure.

The structure consists of an area of severe structural deformation and extensive brecciation that was poorly understood and had been thought to be the result of either thrusting over a dome or a cryptoexplosive event. A 12-mile (19 km) circular structure was discovered by geologist Kevin R. Evans through examination of digital elevation data. The structure was originally called the Weaubleau-Osceola structure after Weaubleau Creek and Osceola. It is now known as the Weaubleau structure.

Because the site was covered by later Pennsylvanian Period sediments, and only partially exposed to erosion relatively recently, its structure is well preserved, and its age can be determined with fair accuracy. It is one of a series of known or suspected impact sites along the 38th parallel in the states of Illinois, Missouri, and Kansas. These 38th parallel structures are thought to possibly be the result of a serial impact, similar to that of comet Shoemaker-Levy 9 on Jupiter, an extremely unlikely event on Earth. The argument for a serial strike would be greatly strengthened if the ages of the other 38th parallel structures could be constrained to the same period as the Weaubleau structure.

The Weaubleau structure is one of the fifty largest known impact structures on earth and the fourth largest in the United States. The three larger ones in the US either have been glaciated and buried (Manson crater), are under water (Chesapeake Bay crater), or have been subjected to orogeny (Beaverhead impact structure). Therefore, the Weaubleau structure is the largest exposed untectonized impact structure in the US.

== Round rocks ==
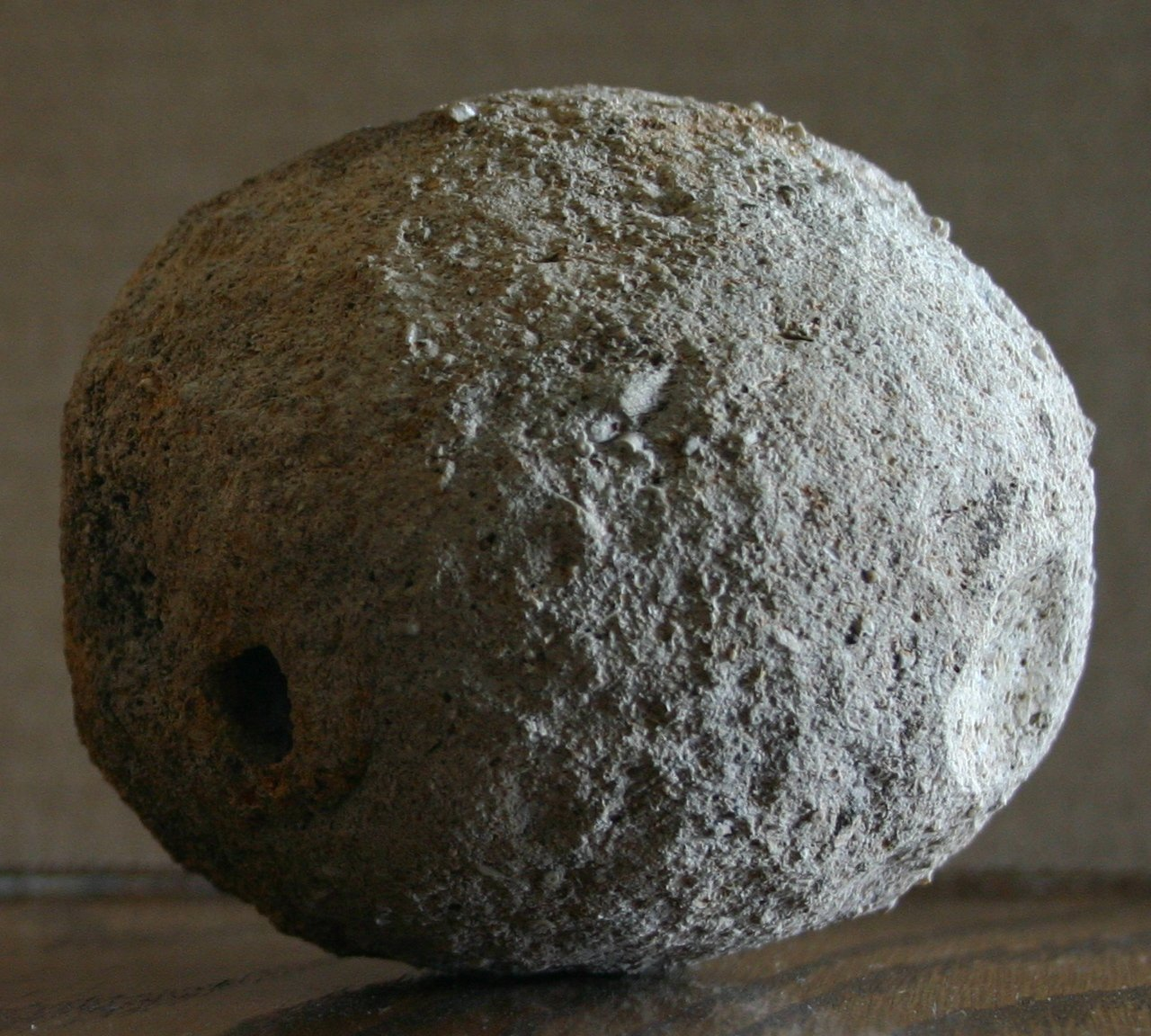
One of the "round rocks" found in Osceola, Missouri

Long thought to be a glacial remnant, these conglomerate rocks are found in the area of the Weaubleau structure. They are nearly perfectly round, and are referred to locally simply as "geodes", "round rocks", "Missouri rock balls", or "Weaubleau eggs".

It has been suggested that the round rocks are chert concretions or nodules. The round rocks may have formed when the impact threw shale clasts of the Northview Formation away from the center of the impact structure and subsequent silica-saturated waters precipitated silica around the shale clasts. The formation of the round rocks is poorly understood and requires further research.

== See also ==
- 38th parallel structures
- List of possible impact structures on Earth
- OzarksWatch Video Magazine: Discovering Missouri's Ancient Meteor Impacts
