= Geology of Saskatchewan =

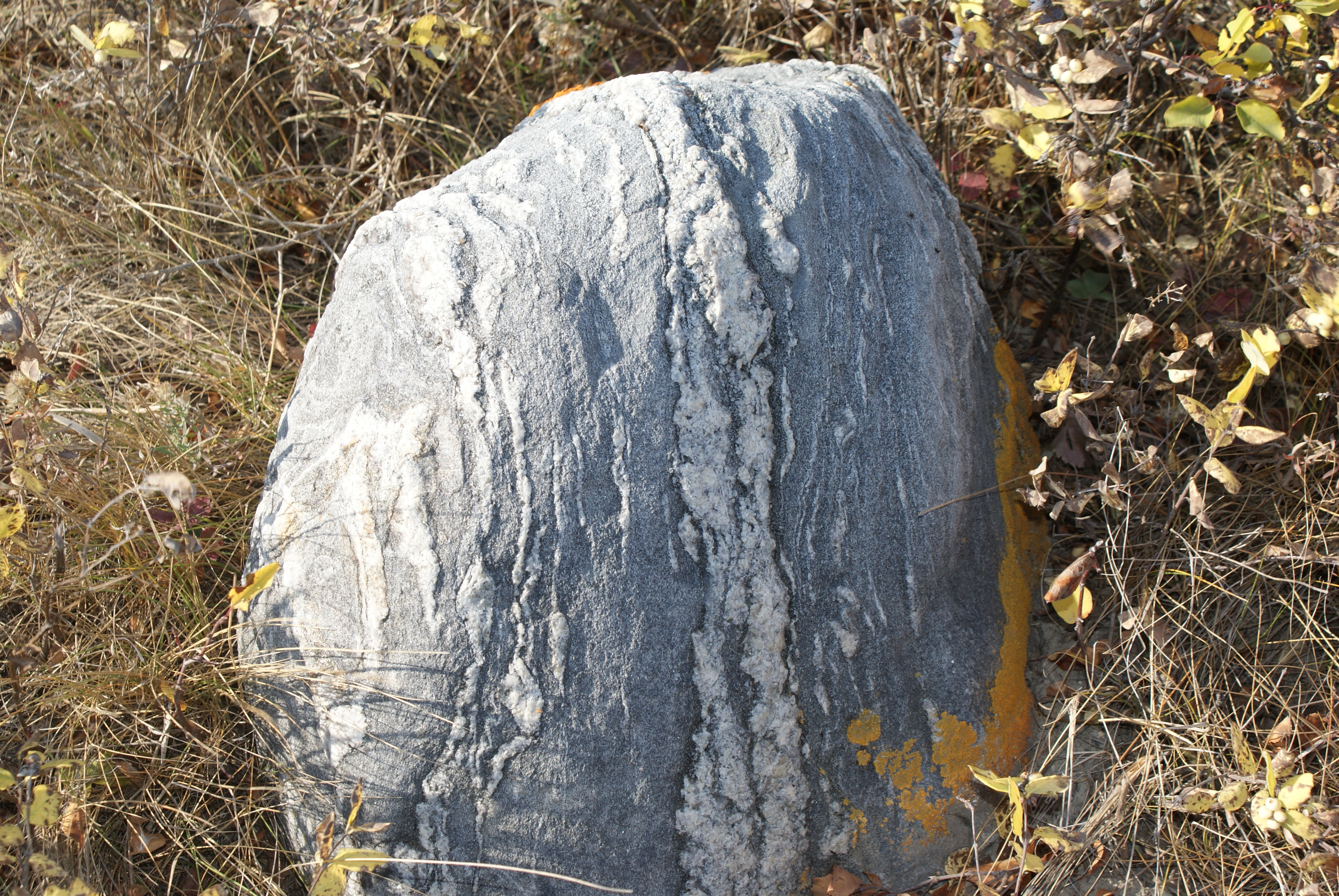
A metamorphic rock showing Gneissic layering. Alternate layers of minerals. Metamorphism where minerals are stretched, mashed and re-arranged in foliated textures. Feldspar and quartz are light layers with ferromagnesian minerals.

The geology of Saskatchewan can be divided into two main geological regions, the Precambrian Canadian Shield and the Phanerozoic Western Canadian Sedimentary Basin. Within the Precambrian shield exists the Athabasca sedimentary basin. Meteorite impacts have altered the natural geological formation processes. The prairies were most recently affected by glacial events in the Quaternary period.

== Canadian Shield ==
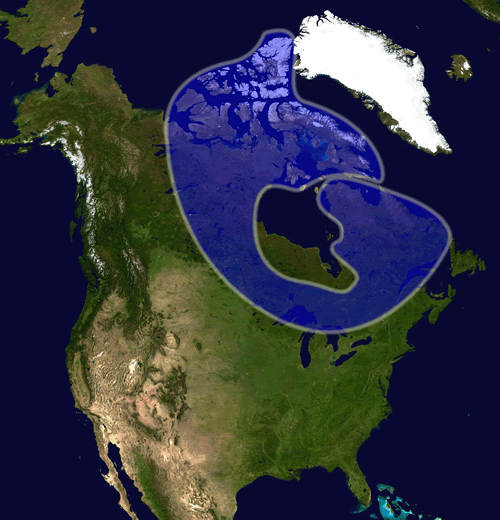
Canadian Shield

The Canadian Shield, Precambrian shield, makes up the bedrock geology highlighted by rocks and lakes and a boreal forest area. There are transitional areas between boreal and tundra flora. The lower boundary of the Canadian Shield cuts across the province diagonally from the latitude 57 degrees in the northwest to 54 degrees in the southeast. Three orogenies formed the Precambrian shield, the Kenoran (Laurentian-Algoman), Hudsonian (Penokean) and Grenville Orogeny. Between 2.2 and 2.5 billion years ago was the Kenoran Orogeny, which was overlain by the Hudsonian Orogeny 1,700 to 1,900 million years ago.^{[MapA]} The Earth was experiencing hotter and more volatile Archean tectonics, evidencing island arc volcanic activity and mountain building. The Trans-Hudson Orogen occurred when a number of Archean continental blocks came together, including the Superior Craton from the southeast and Hearne-Rae craton from the northwest. A microcontinent named the Sask Craton was underlain in this collision zone. The Canadian Grenville province occurred between 1080 and 980 Ma and did not affect the geology of the Canadian Shield in Saskatchewan. The Grenvillian Orogeny deformed much of eastern Canada, and includes the Grenville Front Tectonic Zone in Quebec and Labrador, the Appalachian structural front to the south between what we now name the Great Lakes and Newfoundland.

The Flin Flon greenstone belt, also referred to as the Flin Flon-Snow Lake greenstone belt, is a Precambrian greenstone belt located in the central area of Manitoba and east-central Saskatchewan. It lies in the central portion of the Trans-Hudson Orogeny and was formed by arc volcanism during the Paleoproterozoic Era.

=== Athabasca basin ===
The Athabasca Basin, a historical fluvial siliciclastic basin with sediments from the Hudsonian mountains with the occasional rare marine sequence. The Athabasca Basin was formed during the Statherian or Paleohelikian 1.7 to 1.6 billion years ago when coarse fluvial and marine clastic sediments were laid down containing gold, copper, lead, zinc, and uranium oxides. The highest-grade uranium deposits in the world are found at the unconformity between these clastic layers and the Precambrian bedrock. The Athabasca Sand Hills protected by Athabasca Sand Dunes Provincial Park are unique feature of the Canadian Shield. The hills are located in northern Saskatchewan and border Lake Athabasca, which straddles the Alberta and Saskatchewan border.

== Phanerozoic Western Canadian Sedimentary Basin ==
There were three depositional stages for the Western Canada Sedimentary Basin which were dependent on plate tectonics of the era. Present-day North America was identified to lay upon the Proterozoic super-continent, Rodinia.

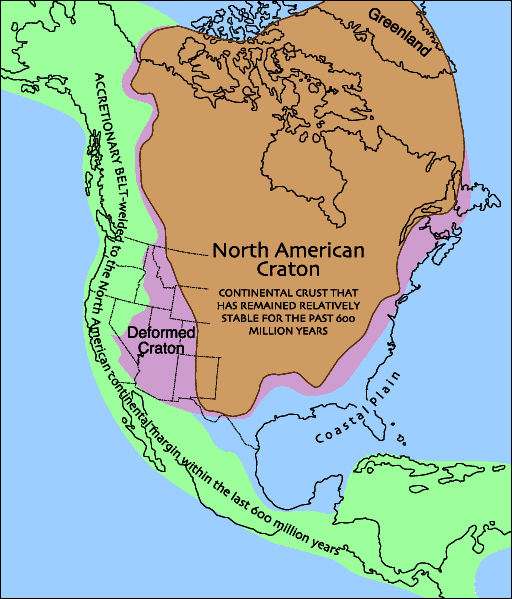
Laurentia, also called the North American craton.

This continent broke apart about 700 million years ago and formed other continents, one of which was Laurentia or the North American Craton. Laurentia drifted south of the equatorial zone. As this new smaller continent was smaller than Rodinia, it had some surface area under water level, including area designated as the Phanerozoic basin. Cambrian 544-505 Ma to Mississippian 362-320 Ma period laid down base clastics, then platform carbonates and evaporites. These deposits form the origins of potash evaporites for the potash industry. Laurentia began to rise at the close of the Cambrian Period. Huge flooding occurred during the Middle Ordovician period 505-441 Ma. Laurentia had shifted again, and the region of Saskatchewan was now north of the equator and some raising exposing the land again. Re-flooding in the Late Ordovician age with warm water increased calcium carbonate sedimentation, and marine life.

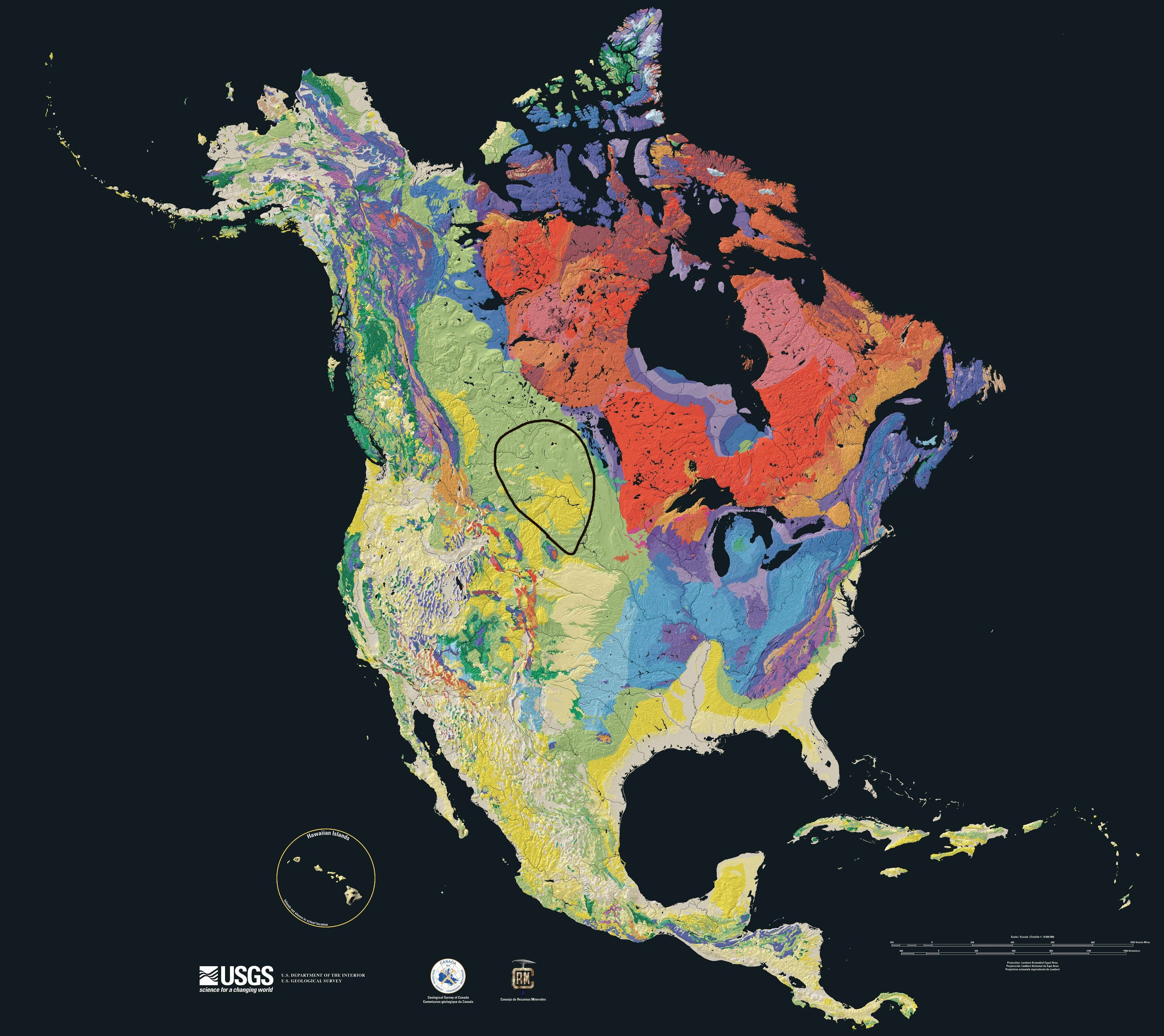
Williston basin outlined. Canadian shield is red. Phanerozoic basin is greenish yellow.

The Williston Basin was formed creating a lowered land area during this period filling with the Winnipeg Sea. The Williston basin was mainly south of Saskatchewan but extended north into the Saskatchewan plains area.

Laurasia was created near the end of the Silurian Period. Laurasia was formed from the joining of Laurentia with Gondwana and two smaller continents which had broken off Rodinia. The orogeny between Laurasia and Gondwana created the Appalachian Mountains, and an exodus of water from the Laurasian land surface. In the early Devonian Period 418-361 Ma, Laurasia separated from Gondwana, creating a depressions or land separations through the continent. One low-lying area occurred along the edge between the Cambrian shield and the Phanerozoic basin, the other trough lay along southwestern Saskatchewan extending east and west along the plains areas we know today. The Saskatchewan region was again south of the equator and under water, with reefs forming. A major barrier reef formed in the area now known as British Columbia, creating higher salinity levels east of the reef. Calcium carbonate, halite, gypsum, and potash were evaporite deposits. The Antler orogeny on the southwest coast of Laurasia caused upheavals.

Following this orogeny, during the Carboniferous Period in the Mississippian epoch 362-320 Ma the Williston Basin again subsided and the area of the Phanerozoic basin was again mainly under tropical marine water. Oil production of southeastern Saskatchewan emerges mainly from Mississippian rocks.

Animated map from Pangaea to present

During the Pennsylvanian epoch 320-286 Ma of the Carboniferous period, Laurasia joined with Gondwana to become Pangea. This supercontinent rose above sea level, in an equatorial zone producing desert-like conditions. The late Triassic 245-208 Ma or early Jurassic 208-144 Ma to Jura-Cretaceous 208-66 Ma where red clay beds and marine clastics were deposited. Pangea began to separate during the Jurassic period.

The Kimberlite Volcanoes of this period produce the Kimberlite diamonds which are mined today. Near Fort à La Corne (FALC) were Kimberlite volcanoes in Archean cratons.

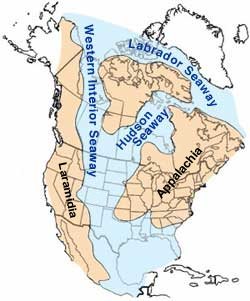
Cretaceous seaway

The Cretaceous 144-66 Ma to Miocene periods deposited clastic sediments from the Cordilleran orogeny. This period saw 40% of the region now called North America below sea level under the Rocky Mountain Seaway which comprised the Western Interior Seaway and the Hudson Seaway, and Labrador Seaway. The Cretaceous period rocks produce medium and heavy gravity oil in the Lloydminster region, and of the western province. The Laramide orogeny episode near the end of the Cretaceous and early Tertiary period caused larger gravels to be deposited from the newly formed Rocky Mountains when the Kula and Farallon Plates subducted below the North American Plate. In the Cypress Hills area and southern Saskatchewan, lignite deposits developed from the marshes of these Tertiary rivers. The sea waters have retreated from the areas known as Saskatchewan. The Ravenscrag, Cypress Hills, and Wood Mountain Formations were notable gravel deposits from the Tertiary period. The Williston Basin affects this region at the southern edge. Tectonic movements and global changes in the sea level have given rise to a source of oil, natural gas, and coal.

== Quaternary period ==
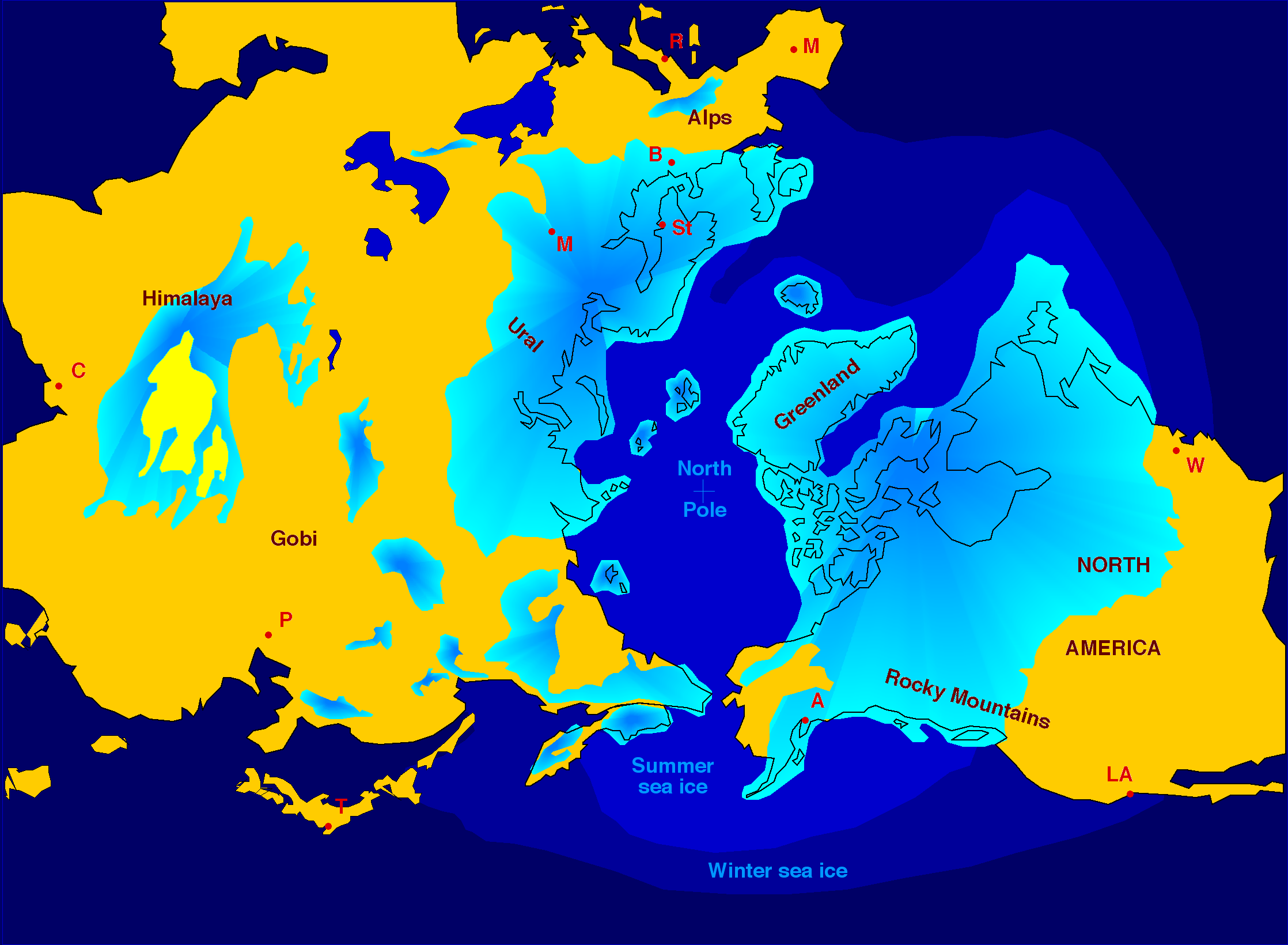
Northern hemisphere glaciation during the last ice ages. The accumulation of 3 to 4 kilometres (1.9 to 2.5 mi) thick ice sheets caused a sea level lowering of about 120 metres (390 ft)

During the Quaternary period, between 2 and 3 million years ago, the prairies were covered by a glacier, the Laurentide Ice Sheet. It was 3 kilometres (1.9 mi) thick, which advanced and receded several times across the prairies. There were multiple glaciations affecting the Saskatchewan area during the Pre-Illinoian, Illinoian, and Wisconsin stages of the last ice age. These glaciations occurred during the Quaternary period, which comprises the last two million years. Northern Saskatchewan and the shield area shows the effects of glacial erosion and scour; the Western Canada Sedimentary Basin is a location of glacial deposition and collection. In southern Saskatchewan there are late Pliocene, pre-Illinoian continental glaciation sand and gravel deposits left behind from water deposition (alluvial) and glacial edge deposits (colluvial). By the study of till, terrain, the limits of the Illinoian glaciation are evidenced around Willow Bunch Lake, Wood Mountain, Cypress Hills area.

Receding glacier

The melting glaciers left behind sand and, silt outwash plains. The Great Sand Hills of Saskatchewan are evidence of winds and sandstorms which have accumulated the sands left behind. Retreating glaciers left meltwater, which pooled in lakes.

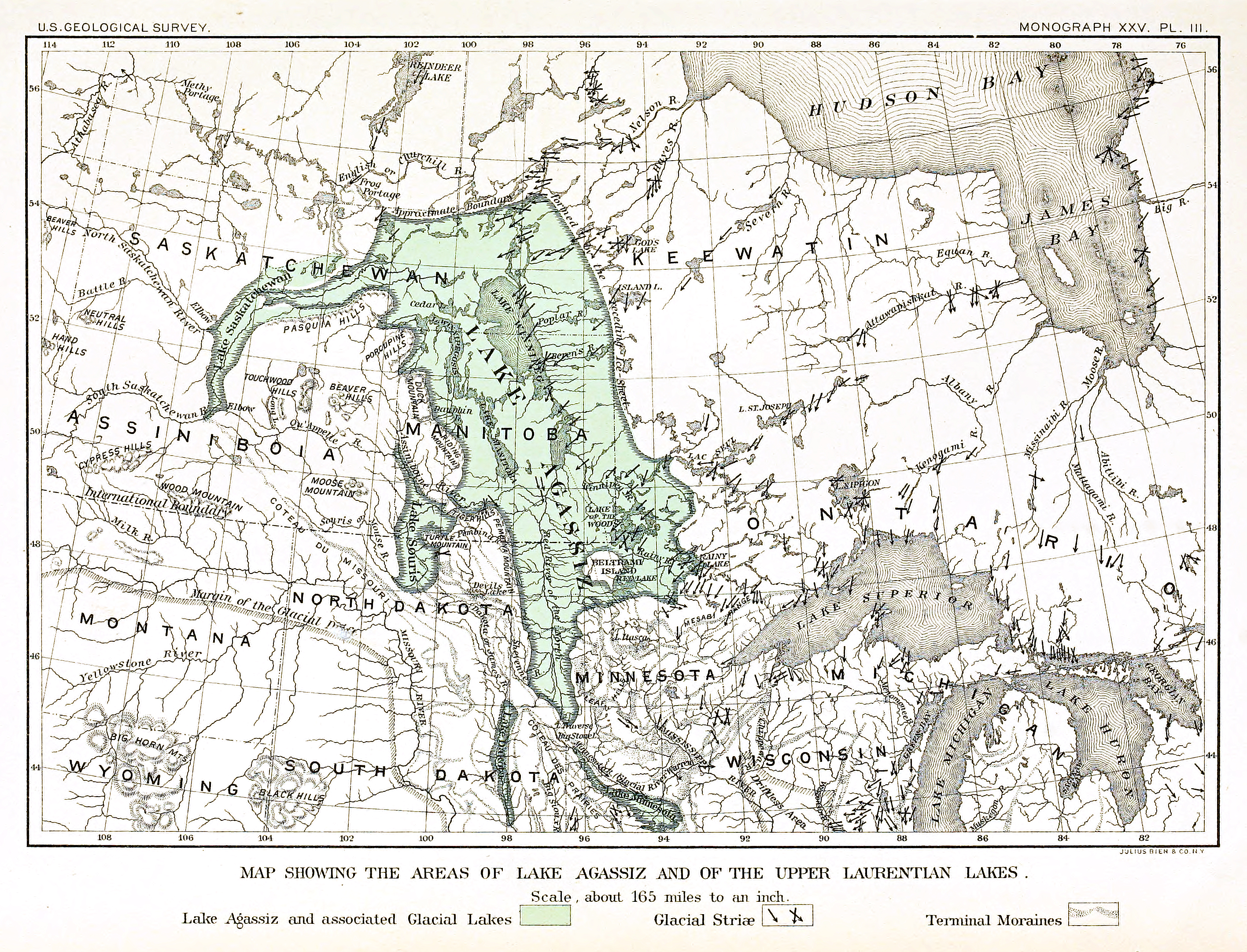
An early map of the extent of Lake Agassiz by 19th century geologist Warren Upham. This map is now believed to underestimate the extent of the region once overlain by Lake Agassiz.

Glacial Lake Regina covered south-central area, and Glacial Lake Agassiz covered much of Saskatchewan and neighbouring regions of the U.S. and Manitoba. The ice and water retreated, and the lake beds formed flat plains. The land exposed from under the ice sheets was rubble, and ridges of gravel.

=== Glaciotectonic hills ===
The Dirt Hills and Cactus Hills represent the most defined and biggest Møns Klint glaciotectonic hills of the world. There are other similar hills created by ice action in southern Saskatchewan as well. Glaciotectonic hills or ice-shoved hills show thrusting, folds, ridges and push moraines.^{[Map]} These hills consist of upper Cretaceous bedrock which rises to an elevation of 880 metres (2,890 ft) in the Dirt Hills. To the north is the Regina Lake Plain, which is 300 metres (980 ft) lower in elevation. The Missouri Coteau from whence the hills arise, is 120 metres (390 ft) lower than these hills. Between the Alberta and Saskatchewan Plains is the Missouri Coteau, dead ice moraine, a major escarpment, a long meandering ridge of hill country.^{[Map2]} The area is probably underlain with marine shale of the Bearpaw Formation. This area remained above the ice sheets, being pushed and folded by the glacier movement.

== Astroblemes ==
There are six notable meteorite or comet impact craters in Saskatchewan. Carswell, Deep Bay, and Gow Lake have affected the Canadian Shield area of the north. In the southern Phanerozoic crater are the Viewfield, Elbow, and Maple Creek structures. The Carswell structure is the largest astrobleme at 35 kilometres (22 mi) in diameter. It is estimated that the impact to the Athabasca basin occurred about 478 million years ago during the Ordovician period. The thrust of the impact affected the Athabasca Rock groups. The William River Subgroup and the Douglas and Carswell formations show inversions, thrusting and disruptions. The impact that occurred about 210 million years ago has created the Gow Lake Structure. This lake is 5 kilometres (3.1 mi) in diameter with Calder island centrally located. La Ronge is 160 kilometres (99 mi) south-southwest of the crater location. The other impact crater of the Cambrian shield is the Deep Bay Structure, which created a bay in the southerly part of Reindeer Lake. The crater is about 11 kilometres (6.8 mi) in diameter and about 220 metres (720 ft) at the deepest point. The circular impact ridge 100 metres (330 ft) above water level partially encompasses the crater area. There is some central uplift. The crater was formed about 50 to 150 million years ago. Weyburn is west and Stoughton is north of the Viewfield Impact Structure, a small impact crater 2 kilometres (1.2 mi) in diameter. The impact occurred in the early Jurassic period about 190 million years ago. Oil and gas reserves have been found in the area of the rim breccia Another impact crater in the Phanerezoic crater is the Maple Creek Structure. This impact affected Upper Cretaceous Bearpaw Formation sediments on the north edge of the Cypress Hills, and roughly occurred 75 million years ago. Maple Creek is located north northwest of this 6 kilometres (3.7 mi) diameter crater. The Elbow Impact Structure is 8 kilometres (5.0 mi) in diameter and the impact occurred between 370 and 415 million years ago during the Devonian Period. The crater is located in the Rural Municipality of Maple Bush No. 224 northeast of Riverhurst and west of Grainfield. The Elbow crater is located south of the elbow of the South Saskatchewan River, and south of Lake Diefenbaker across the waters from the town of Elbow.

== Notes ==
^{MapA} Map of Zin Bay region, Precambrian era — note Zin Bay is located in present day terms north of Athabasca Lake within Saskatchewan. Note also the large Tazin Lake comprising much of the area north of the present day treeline. The map shows the Martin Formation which shows rocks dating 1.63 billion years ago. The northeastern basement complex contains rocks which date 2.44 billion years ago. All of the map is Precambrian in age.
^{Map1} Glacial limits in North America of the glaciations.
^{Map} Aerial photo of Crestwynd which is east of Old Wives Lake and west of Cactus Hills. The aerial photo shows ridges from north est to southeast. Satellite imaging maps of southern Saskatchewan showing spring and winter images of the Cactus and Dirt Hills area of the Missouri Coteau.

^{Map2} Map of glaciotectonic hills of southern Saskatchewan and the Missouri Coteau.

== See also ==
- Bearpaw Formation
- Craton - Kenora orogeny
- Frenchman Formation
- Judith River Group
- Maastrichtian
- Morrison Formation
- Nevadan orogeny
- Sevier orogeny
- Volcanology of Canada
- Wyoming Craton
