= Steen River impact structure =

Impact structure in Alberta

- Location within Canada
- Location: Mackenzie County, Alberta, Canada; 59°30′N 117°38′W

Impact crater structure
- Confidence: Confirmed
- Diameter: 25 km (16 mi)
- Age: 91 ± 7 Ma; Late Cretaceous
- Exposed: No
- Drilled: Yes

Steen River is an impact structure in Alberta, Canada. It is 25 km (16 mi) in diameter and the age is estimated to be 91 ± 7 million years (Late Cretaceous). The structure is not exposed at the surface. The original crater was partially eroded prior to burial, and lies under 200 m (660 ft) of sediments.
