= Beaverhead impact structure =

Impact structure in the United States

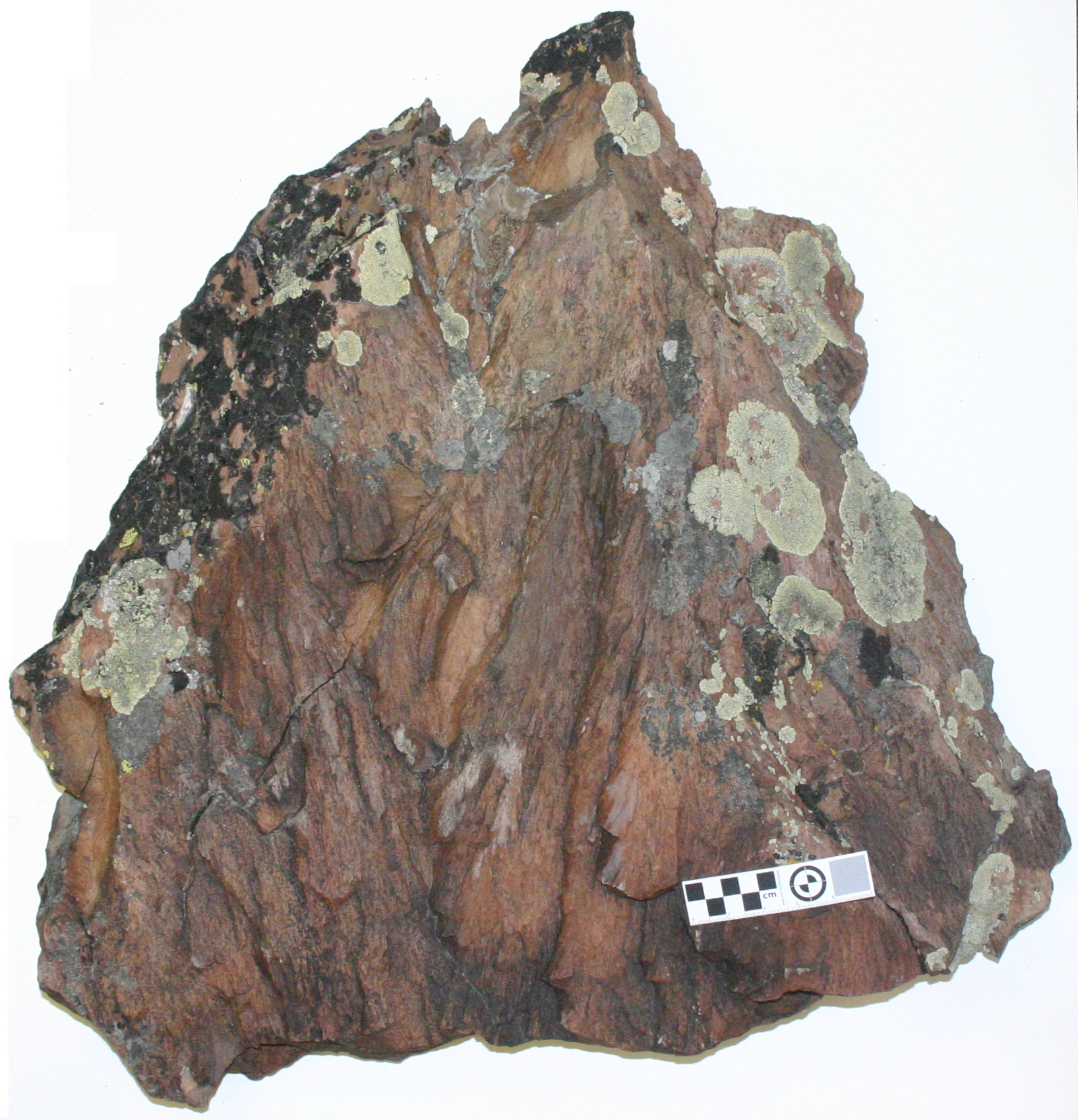
- A shatter cone produced by the Beaverhead impact

- Location within Idaho
- Location: Idaho, Montana, United States; 44°36′N 113°0′W

Impact crater structure
- Confidence: confirmed
- Diameter: 60 kilometres (37 mi)
- Age: 600 million years
- Exposed: Yes
- Drilled: No

The Beaverhead impact structure is the second-largest impact structure within the U.S. It lies within the states of Idaho and Montana. Estimated at 60 kilometers (37 mi) in diameter, it is among the largest impact structures on Earth.

With an estimated age of 600 million years (Neoproterozoic), the impact's original shatter cones along the impact structure's perimeter provide some of the structure's only remaining visible evidence.

It is named for the Beaverhead region of southwestern Montana in which it was first discovered.

== See also ==
- Chesapeake Bay impact crater
- List of impact craters in North America
