= Montagnais crater =

Meteorite crater in the North Atlantic

- Location within Canada
- Location: Nova Scotia, Canada; 42°53′N 64°13′W

Impact crater structure
- Confidence: Confirmed
- Diameter: 45 km (28 mi)
- Age: 50.50 ± 0.76 Ma; Eocene
- Exposed: No
- Drilled: Yes

Montagnais is a meteorite crater located on the continental shelf south of Nova Scotia, Canada.

It measures 45 kilometres (28 mi) in diameter, and its age is estimated to be 50.50 ± 0.76 million years (Eocene). The crater is under the sea and buried beneath marine sediments.
