= Spencer Creek (Dardenne Creek tributary) =

Stream in the American state of Missouri

Coordinates: 38.824773°N 90.587066°W

Spencer Creek is a stream in St. Charles County in the U.S. state of Missouri. It is a tributary of Dardenne Creek.

Spencer Creek has the name of George Spencer, a local judge.

== See also ==
- List of rivers of Missouri
