= Santa Fe impact structure =

Impact crater in New Mexico

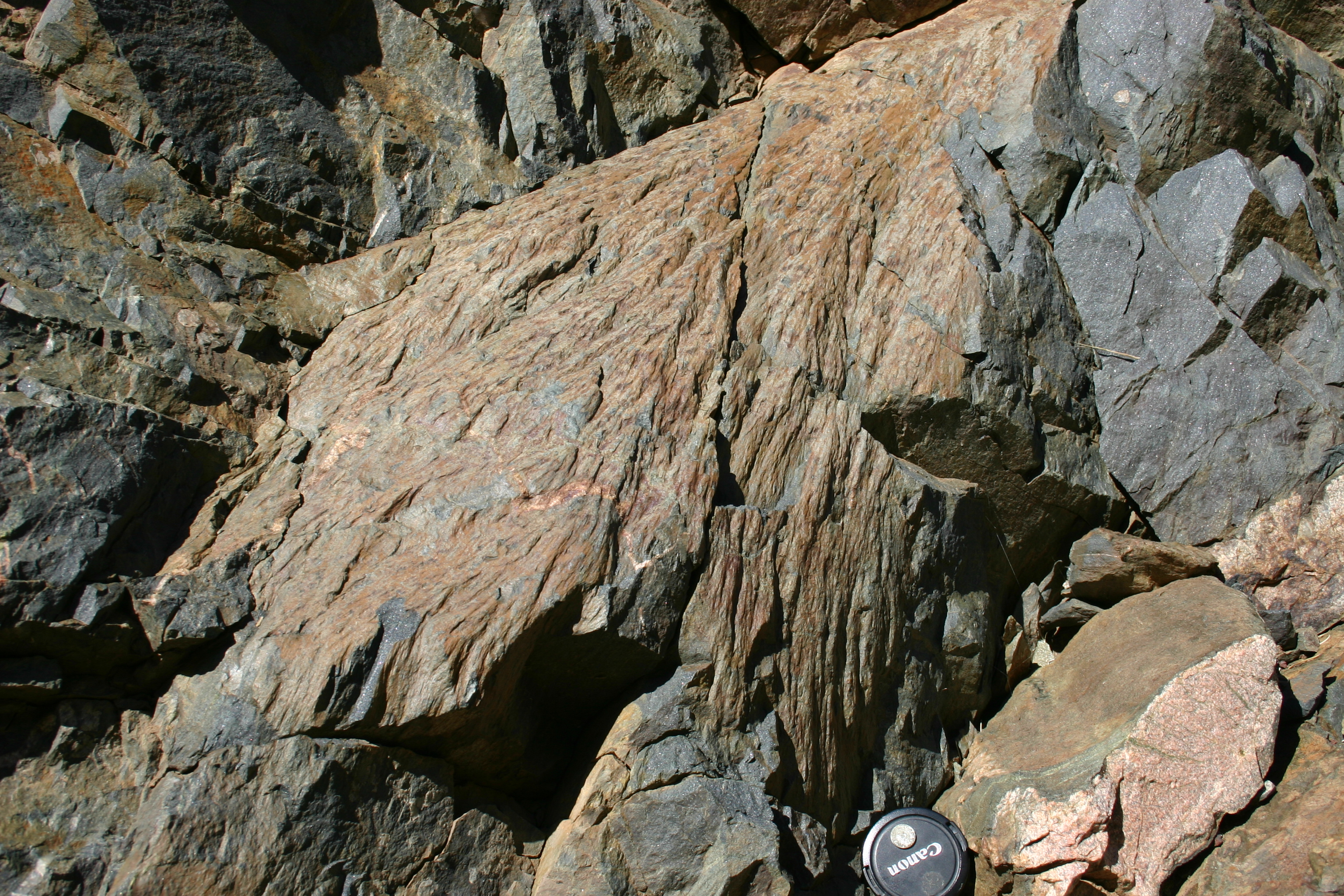
- Shatter cones at the side of Highway 475 in the Santa Fe impact structure

- Location within New Mexico
- Location: Sangre de Cristo Mountains, Santa Fe County, New Mexico, United States; 35°43′41″N 105°51′51″W

Impact crater structure
- Confidence: confirmed
- Diameter: 6 kilometres (3.7 mi)-13 kilometres (8.1 mi)
- Age: less than 1.2 billion years
- Exposed: no
- Drilled: no
- Access: SR475 northeast of Santa Fe

The Santa Fe impact structure is an eroded remnant of a bolide impact crater in the Sangre de Cristo Mountains northeast of Santa Fe, New Mexico. The discovery was made in 2005 by a geologist who noticed shatter cones in the rocks in a decades-old road cut on New Mexico State Road 475 between Santa Fe and Hyde Memorial State Park. Shatter cones are a definitive indicator that the rocks had been exposed to a shock of pressures only possible in a meteor impact or a nuclear explosion.

It is called an "impact structure" and not a crater because it is so deeply eroded. Current estimates place the age of the impact between 1.4 and 1.6 billion years. Only the crater's basement rocks remain on the surface in the mountains today. The estimated diameter of the original impact crater is 6 to 13 kilometers (4 to 8 mi). The shatter cones occur for about 1 mile (1.6 km) along the highway, which is interpreted to coincide with a central area within a crater of greater diameter.
