= Bank Branch (Missouri) =

Stream in Missouri, U.S.

Coordinates: 37°58′10″N 92°47′25″W

Bank Branch is a stream in Camden and Laclede counties in the U.S. state of Missouri. It is a tributary of the Niangua River within the Lake of the Ozarks. The stream passes through Ha Ha Tonka State Park just south of the lake.

Bank Branch most likely was named after the Banks family.

== See also ==
- List of rivers of Missouri
