= Nicholson crater =

Coordinates: 62°40′N 102°41′W

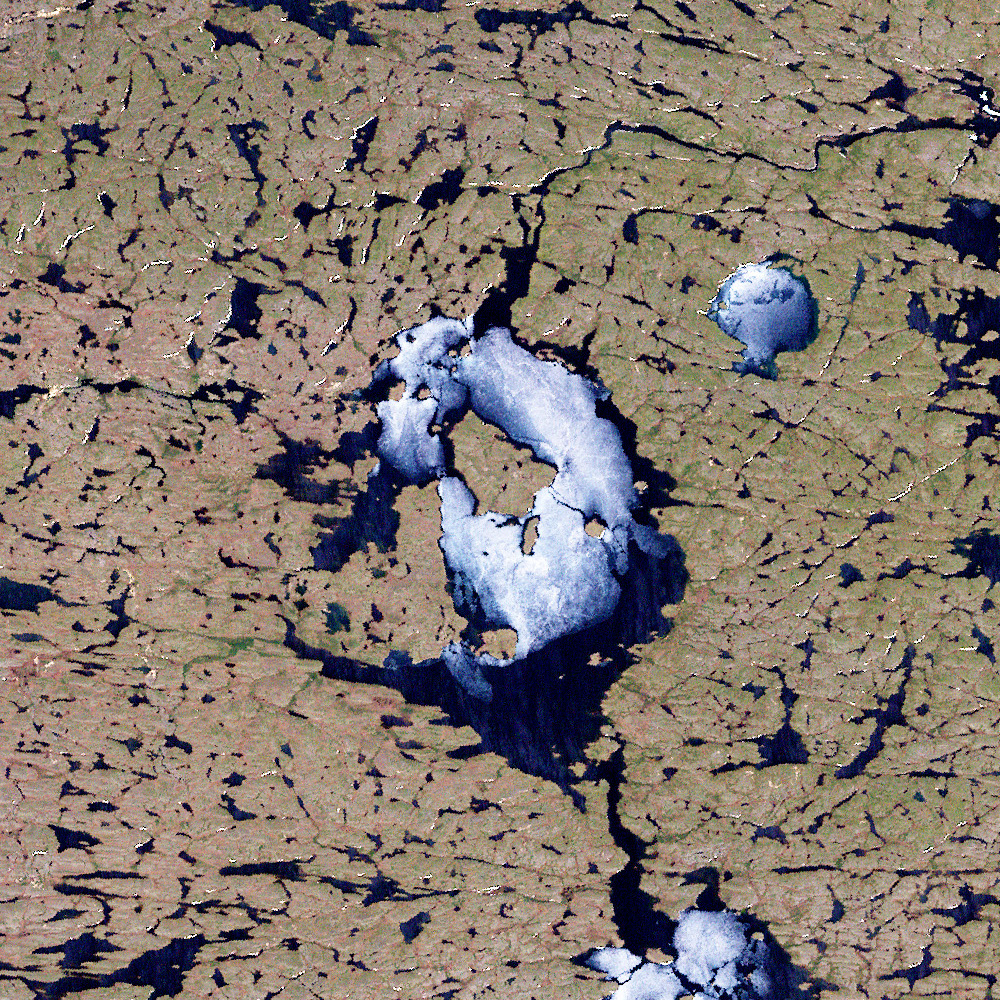
Nicholson crater lake in Canada

Nicholson is a meteorite crater in the Northwest Territories, Canada.

It is 12.5 kilometres (7.8 mi) in diameter and the age is estimated to be less than 400 million years (Devonian or earlier). The crater is not exposed at the surface.
