= Decaturville crater =

Impact crater in Missouri, United States

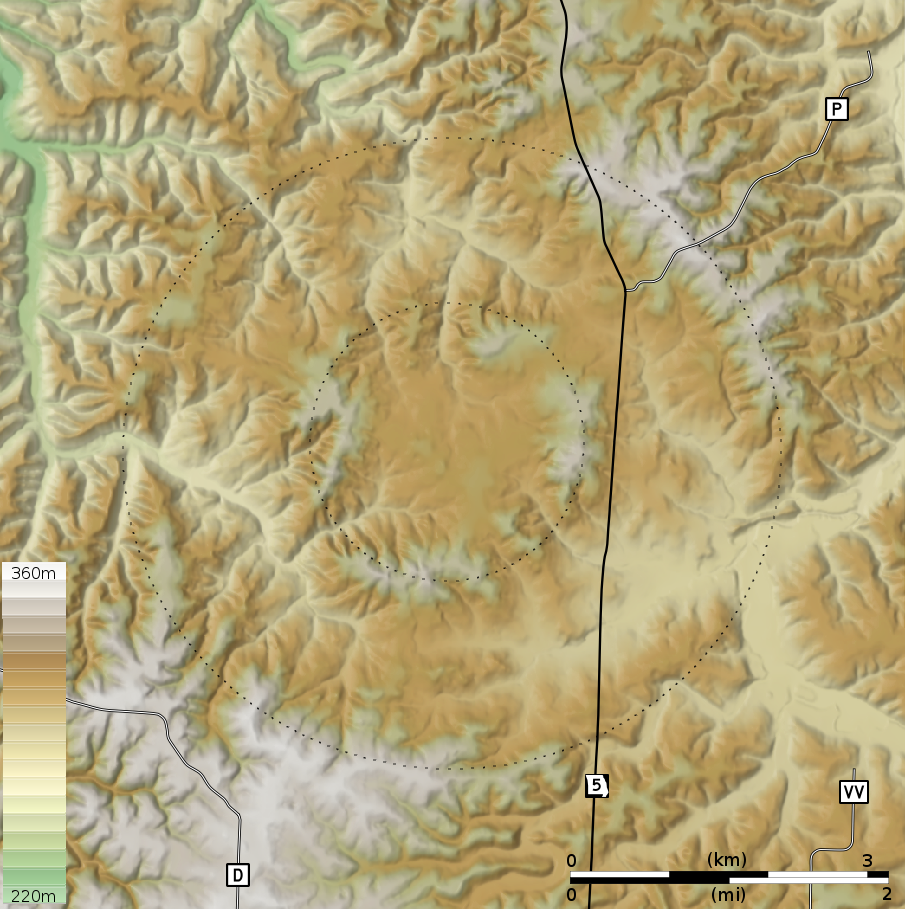
- The topography of the Decaturville crater is highly eroded.

- Location within the United States Location within Missouri
- Location: Missouri; 37°54′N 92°43′W

Impact crater structure
- Confidence: Confirmed
- Diameter: 6 kilometres (3.7 mi)
- Age: < 300 Ma
- Exposed: Yes
- Drilled: Yes

The Decaturville crater, also referred to as the Decaturville Dome, is an impact crater near the town of Decaturville, Missouri, United States.

== Description ==
The crater is one of the 38th parallel structures, a series of circular geophysical features stretching across the central United States which have been hypothesized to be the remnants of an ancient serial impact event.

The Decaturville crater is 6 kilometres (3.7 mi) in diameter and is estimated to be less than 300 million years old (dating to the Permian or younger). The crater is exposed at the surface. The effect that the impact had on the surrounding bedrock can be seen in a roadcut that runs along Highway 5 about 16 miles north of Lebanon.

The crater was first described and mapped in detail by T. W. Offield and H. A. Pohn under NASA funding in the 1970s. Their work was reported in a 1979 U.S. Geological Survey Professional Paper that provides the most detailed description to date.
