= Spencer Creek (Lake of the Ozarks tributary) =

Stream in the U.S. state of Missouri

Coordinates: 37.969757°N 92.780462°W

Spencer Creek is a stream in Camden County in the U.S. state of Missouri. It is a tributary of Lake of the Ozarks.

Spencer Creek bears the name of a local pioneer.

== See also ==
- List of rivers of Missouri
