= Carswell impact structure =

Impact structure in Saskatchewan, Canada

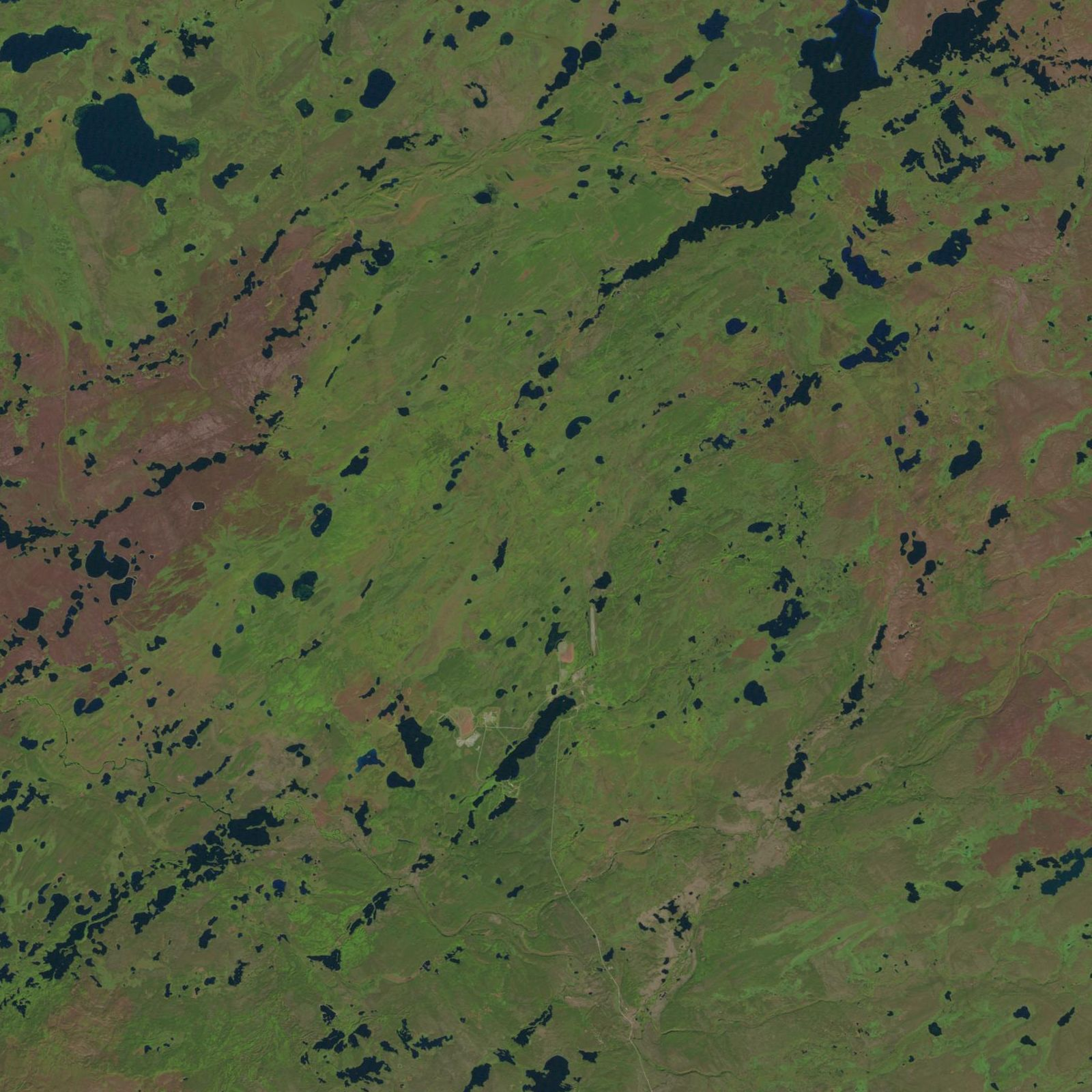
- In the northern part the rim is visible as a series of low hills, in the southern part it is indicated by the course of Douglas River. Carswell Lake (in the upper right) cuts into the structure.

- Location within Saskatchewan
- Location: Saskatchewan, Canada; 58°26′26″N 109°30′24″W

Impact crater structure
- Diameter: 39 kilometres (24 mi)
- Age: 115 ± 10 million years (Lower Cretaceous)
- Exposed: Yes
- Drilled: Yes
- Topo map: NTS 74K5 Cluff Lake, 74K6 Jolley Lake
- Access: Saskatchewan Highway 955

Carswell is an impact structure within the Athabasca Basin of the Canadian Shield in northern Saskatchewan, Canada. It is 39 kilometres (24 mi) in diameter and the age is estimated to be 115 ± 10 million years (Lower Cretaceous). The impact structure is exposed at the surface.

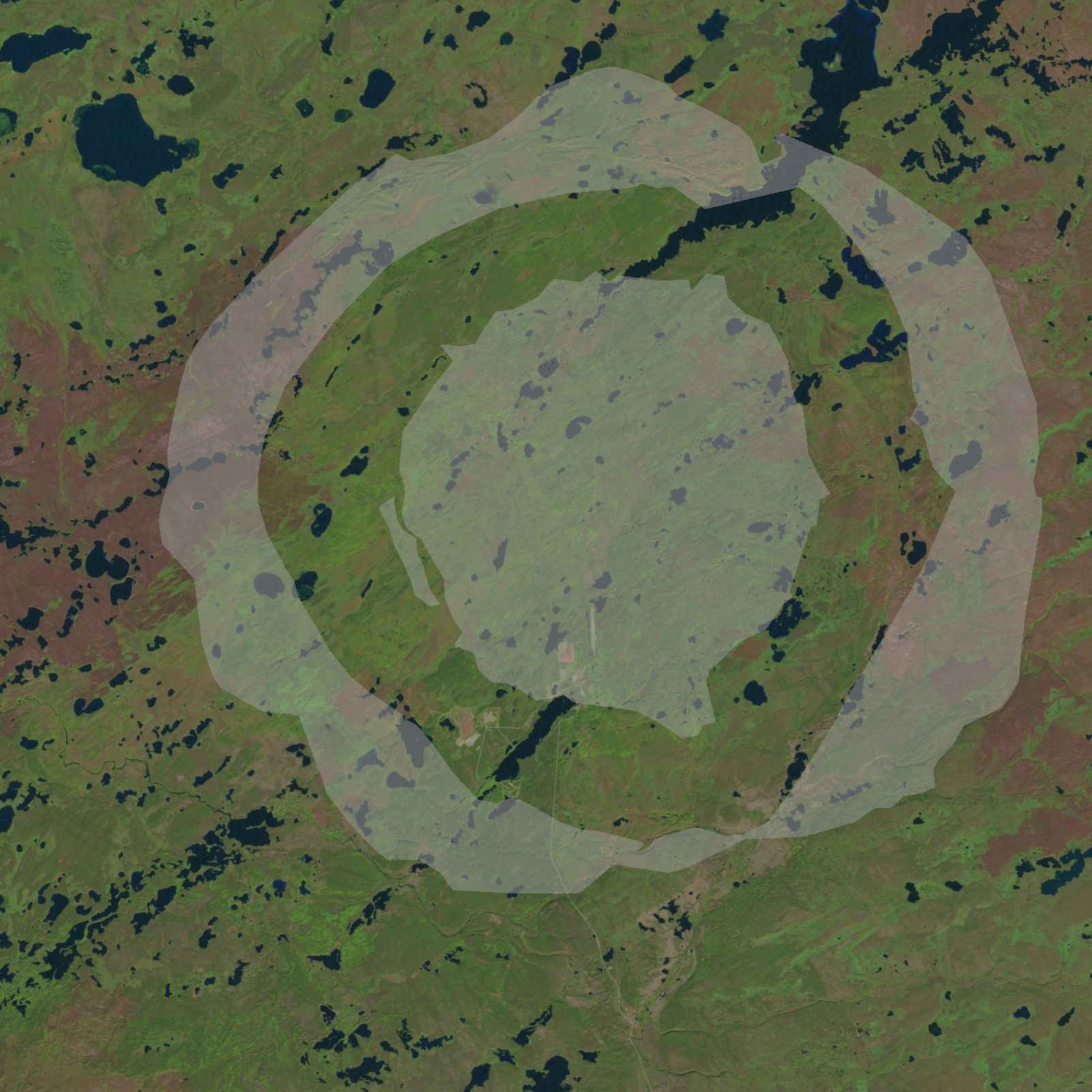
Landsat image with crater structure overlain. The central zone is the highly faulted central peak complex including the Peter River gneiss and the Earl River complex. The outer ring is a zone of faulted bedrock including the Carswell Formation and Douglas Formation. Unshaded areas are generally mapped as the William River Subgroup.

The central peak complex of faulted metamorphic rocks displays shatter cones, planar deformation features, pseudotachylyte veins, and impact melts and breccias. There is also evidence of planar deformation features in quartz grains far to the south of the outer ring of present-day hills, which suggests the ring of hills are not the rim of the original crater but a peak ring within a much larger structure. The Carswell Formation, composed of algal limestone, may have formed on seamounts elevated to near the surface as part of the peak ring.

== Access ==
The Carswell impact structure can be reached by Saskatchewan Highway 955. The 245 kilometres (152 mi) gravel road begins in the village of La Loche and ends at the old Cluff Lake mine site within the crater. The Cluff Lake uranium mine produced over 62 million pounds of yellowcake during its 22-year operating life. Since the mine is now closed and decommissioned, there are no travel services in the vicinity and no functional airstrip. Motorists driving to the structure need to carry sufficient fuel and supplies for the round trip back to La Loche.

== See also ==
- List of impact structures in North America
- Geology of Saskatchewan
