= List of impact structures in Asia and Russia =

World map in equirectangular projection of the impact structures on the Earth Impact Database as of November 2017 (in the SVG file, hover over a structure to show its details)

This list includes all 31 confirmed impact structures in Asia and Russia as listed in the Earth Impact Database. These features were caused by the collision of large meteorites or comets with the Earth. For eroded or buried craters, the stated diameter typically refers to an estimate of original rim diameter, and may not correspond to present surface features.

For additional geographic grouping, non-Siberian Russian impact structures include the region's federal district.

Asia

Siberia as North Asia

== Confirmed impact structures ==
Name	Location	Diameter (km)	Age (years)	Coordinates
Beyenchime-Salaatin	Russia (Siberia)	8	40 ± 20 million	71°0′N 121°40′E
Bigach	Kazakhstan	8	5 ± 3 million	48°34′N 82°1′E
Chiyli	Kazakhstan	5.5	46 ± 7 million	49°10′N 57°51′E
Chukcha	Russia (Siberia)	6	< 70 million	75°42′N 97°48′E
Dhala	India	11	1700-2100 million	25°18′N 78°8′E
El'gygytgyn	Russia (Siberia)	18	3.5 ± 0.5 million	67°30′N 172°5′E
Gusev	Russia (Southern)	3	49.0 ± 0.2 million	48°26′N 40°32′E
Jabal Waqf es Swwan	Jordan	5.5	37-56 million	31°3′N 36°48′E
Jänisjärvi	Russia (Northwestern)	14	700 ± 5 million	61°58′N 30°55′E
Jeokjung-Chogye Basin	South Korea	6	50,000	35°32′N 128°16′E
Jinlin Crater	China	0.9	< 11,700	23°18′N 111°48′E
Kaluga	Russia (Central)	15	380 ± 5 million	54°30′N 36°12′E
Kamensk	Russia (Southern)	25	49.0 ± 0.2 million	48°21′N 40°30′E
Kara	Russia (Northwestern)	65	70.3 ± 2.2 million	69°6′N 64°9′E
Karakul	Tajikistan	52	< 5 million	39°1′N 73°27′E
Karla	Russia (Volga)	10	5 ± 1 million	54°55′N 48°2′E
Kursk	Russia (Central)	6	250 ± 80 million	51°42′N 36°0′E
Logancha	Russia (Siberia)	20	40 ± 20 million	65°31′N 95°56′E
Lonar	India	1.83	52,000 ± 6,000	19°58′N 76°31′E
Macha	Russia (Siberia)	0.3	< 7000	60°6′N 117°35′E
Mishina Gora	Russia (Northwestern)	2.5	300 ± 50 million	58°43′N 28°3′E
Popigai	Russia (Siberia)	100	35.7 ± 0.2 million	71°39′N 111°11′E
Puchezh-Katunki	Russia (Volga)	80	167 ± 3 million	56°58′N 43°43′E
Ragozinka	Russia (Urals)	9	46 ± 3 million	58°44′N 61°48′E
Saqqar	Saudi Arabia	34	70-410 Ma	29°35′N 38°42′E
Shunak	Kazakhstan	2.8	45 ± 10 million	47°13′N 72°46′E
Sikhote-Alin	Russia (Siberia)	0.026	78	46°7′N 134°40′E
Sobolev	Russia (Siberia)	0.053	< 1000	46°18′N 137°52′E
Tabun-Khara-Obo	Mongolia	1.3	150 ± 20 million	44°8′N 109°39′E
Wabar	Saudi Arabia	0.116	162	21°30′N 50°28′E
Xiuyan crater	China	1.8	~50,000	40°21′N 123°27′E
Yilan crater	China	1.85	49,300 ± 3,200	46°23′6″N 129°18′45″E
Zhamanshin	Kazakhstan	14	900,000 ± 100,000	48°24′N 60°58′E

== Unconfirmed impact structures ==
The following craters are officially considered "unconfirmed" because they are not listed in the Earth Impact Database. Due to stringent requirements regarding evidence and peer-reviewed publication, newly discovered craters or those with difficulty collecting evidence generally are known for some time before becoming listed. However, entries on the unconfirmed list could still have an impact origin disproven.

Name	Location	Diameter	Age	Coordinates
Cheko	Russia (Siberia)	~0.5 km	~100 years	60.964°N 101.86°E
Patomskiy	Russia (Siberia)	~0.16 km	~300 years	59°17′4″N 116°35′22″E
Ramgarh	Rajasthan, India	~3.0 km	?	25°20′56″N 76°37′29″E
Shiva	Indian Ocean west of India	~600 km	~65 Ma	18°40′N 70°14′E
Suavjärvi	Russia (Northwestern)	16	2400 million (approx.)	63°7′N 33°23′E
Tokrauskaya	Kazakhstan	~220 km	~450 Ma	
Ishim	Kazakhstan	~350 km	~450 Ma	

== See also ==
- Impact craters
- Impact events
- Bolides and Meteorites
- Earth Impact Database – primary source
- Traces of Catastrophe book from Lunar and Planetary Institute - comprehensive reference on impact crater science
