= List of impact structures on Earth =

World map in equirectangular projection of the impact structures on the Earth Impact Database as of November 2017 (in the SVG file, hover over a structure to show its details)

This list of impact structures (including impact craters) on Earth contains the majority of the 194+ confirmed impact structures given in the Earth Impact Database as of 2024.

Alphabetical lists for different continents can be found under Impact structures by continent below.

Unconfirmed structures can be found at List of possible impact structures on Earth.

== Confirmed impact structures listed by size and age ==
These features were caused by the collision of meteors (consisting of large fragments of asteroids) or comets (consisting of ice, dust particles and rocky fragments) with the Earth. For eroded or buried craters, the stated diameter typically refers to the best available estimate of the original rim diameter, and may not correspond to present surface features. Time units are either in ka (thousands) or Ma (millions) of years.

=== 10 ka or less ===
This section includes only structures with a diameter of 100 m (330 ft) or more. The EID lists fewer than ten such craters, and the largest in the last 100,000 years (100 ka) is the 4.5 km (2.8 mi) Rio Cuarto crater in Argentina. However, there is some uncertainty regarding its origins and age, with some sources giving it as < 10 ka, while the EID gives a broader < 100 ka.

The Kaali impacts (c. 1500 BC) during the Nordic Bronze Age may have influenced Estonian and Finnish mythology, the Campo del Cielo (c. 2500 BC) could be in the legends of some Native Argentine tribes, while Henbury (c. 2700 BC) has figured in Australian Aboriginal oral traditions.

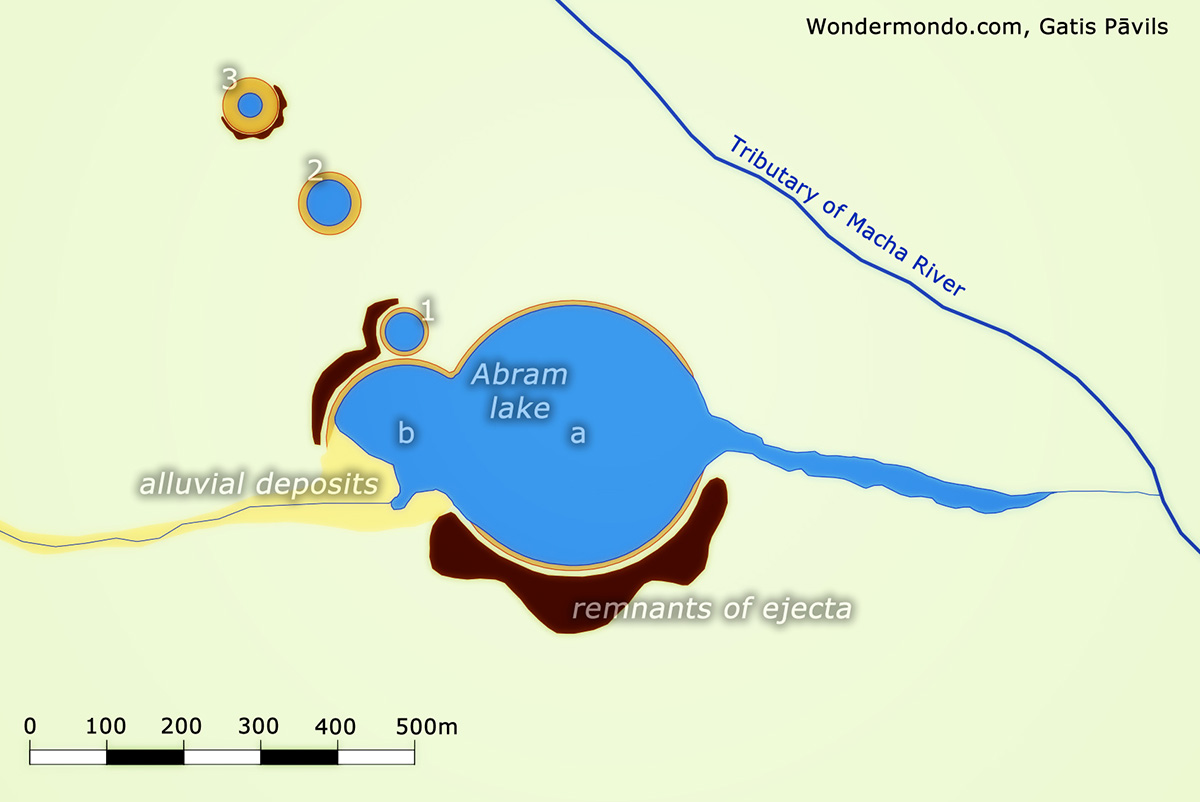
Macha crater field map

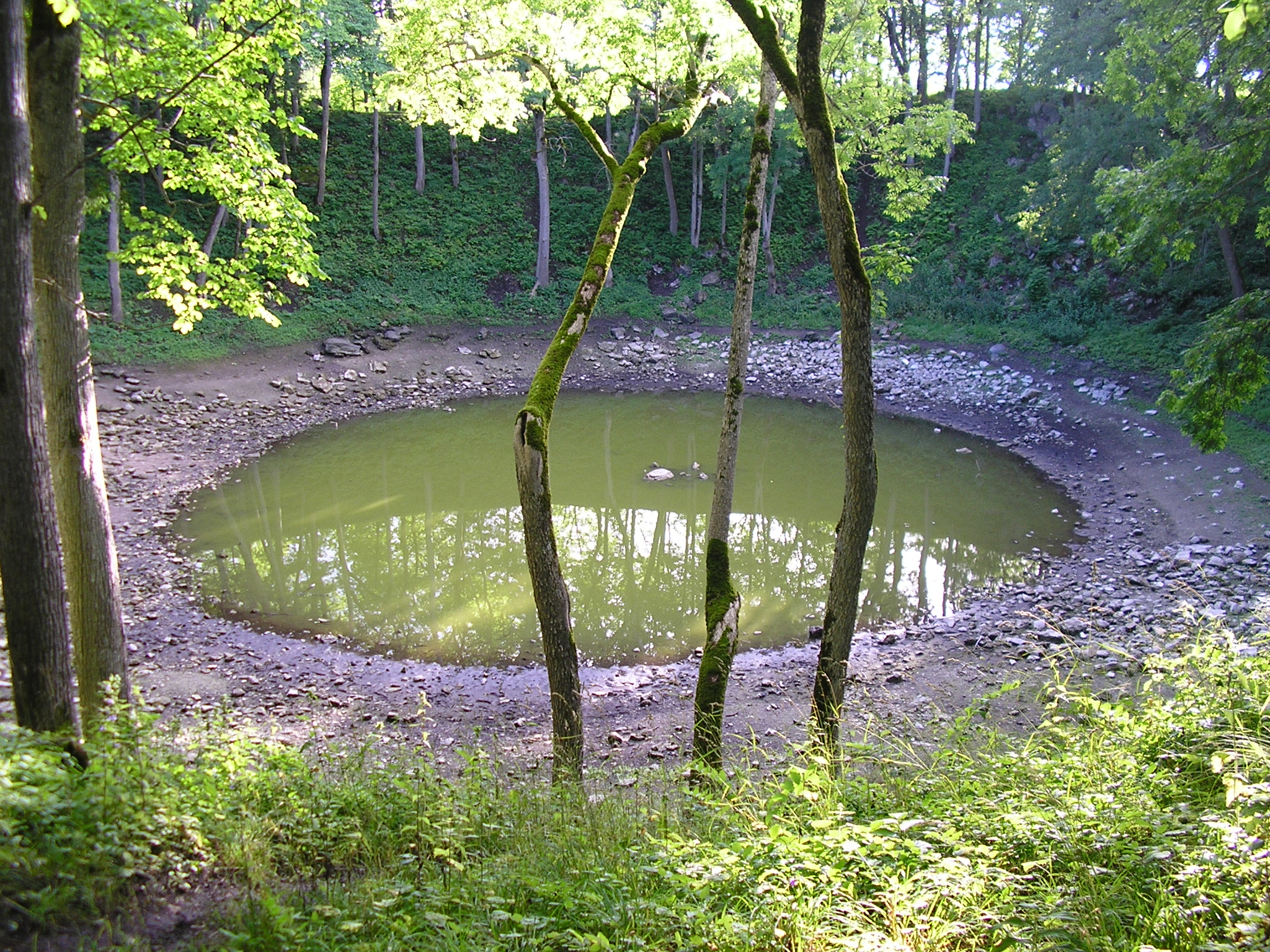
One of the Kaali craters

Name	Location	Country	Diameter (km)	Age (ka)	Date	Coordinates
Jinlin	Guangdong Province	China	0.9	< 10		23°18′N 111°49′E
Wabar	Rub' al Khali desert	Saudi Arabia	0.1	0.2	~1800 AD	21°30′N 50°28′E
Dalgaranga	Western Australia	Australia	0.024	less than 3?		
Whitecourt	Alberta	Canada	0.04	1.1	900 AD	54°00′N 115°36′W
Kaali	Saaremaa	Estonia	0.1	3.5	1500 BC	58°24′N 22°40′E
Campo del Cielo	Chaco	Argentina	0.1	4.5	2500 BC	27°38′S 61°42′W
Henbury	Northern Territory	Australia	0.2	4.7	2700 BC	24°34′S 133°8′E
Morasko	Poznań	Poland	0.1	5.0	3000 BC	52°29′N 16°54′E
Boxhole	Northern Territory	Australia	0.2	5.4	3400 BC	22°37′S 135°12′E
Macha	Sakha Republic	Russia	0.3	7.3	5300 BC	60°6′N 117°35′E
Luna	Gujarat	India	1.5–1.8	less than 6.9	< 5000 BC	

The EID gives a size of about 50 m (160 ft) for Campo del Cielo, but other sources quote 100 m (330 ft).

=== 10 ka to 1 Ma ===
This section includes only structures with a diameter of less than one km (0.62 mi).

Name	Location	Country	Diameter (km)	Age (ka)	Coordinates
Wolfe Creek	Western Australia	Australia	0.9	< 120	19°10′S 127°48′E
Hickman	Western Australia	Australia	0.26	10–100	
Kalkkop	Eastern Cape	South Africa	0.64	~250	
Jeokjung-Chogye Basin	Gyeongsangnam	South Korea	8	30–63	35°33′N 128°16′E
Monturaqui	Atacama Desert	Chile	0.455	640 ± 140	23°56′S 68°16′W
Pantasma	Jinotega	Nicaragua	14	804	
Amguid	Tamanrasset	Algeria	0.45	10–100	
Aorounga Central	Borkou	Chad	16	Possibly 500	

The largest in the last one million years is the 14-kilometre (8.7 mi) Zhamanshin crater in Kazakhstan; this has been described as being capable of producing a nuclear-like winter.

The source of the enormous Australasian strewnfield (c. 780 ka) is a currently undiscovered crater probably located in Southeast Asia.

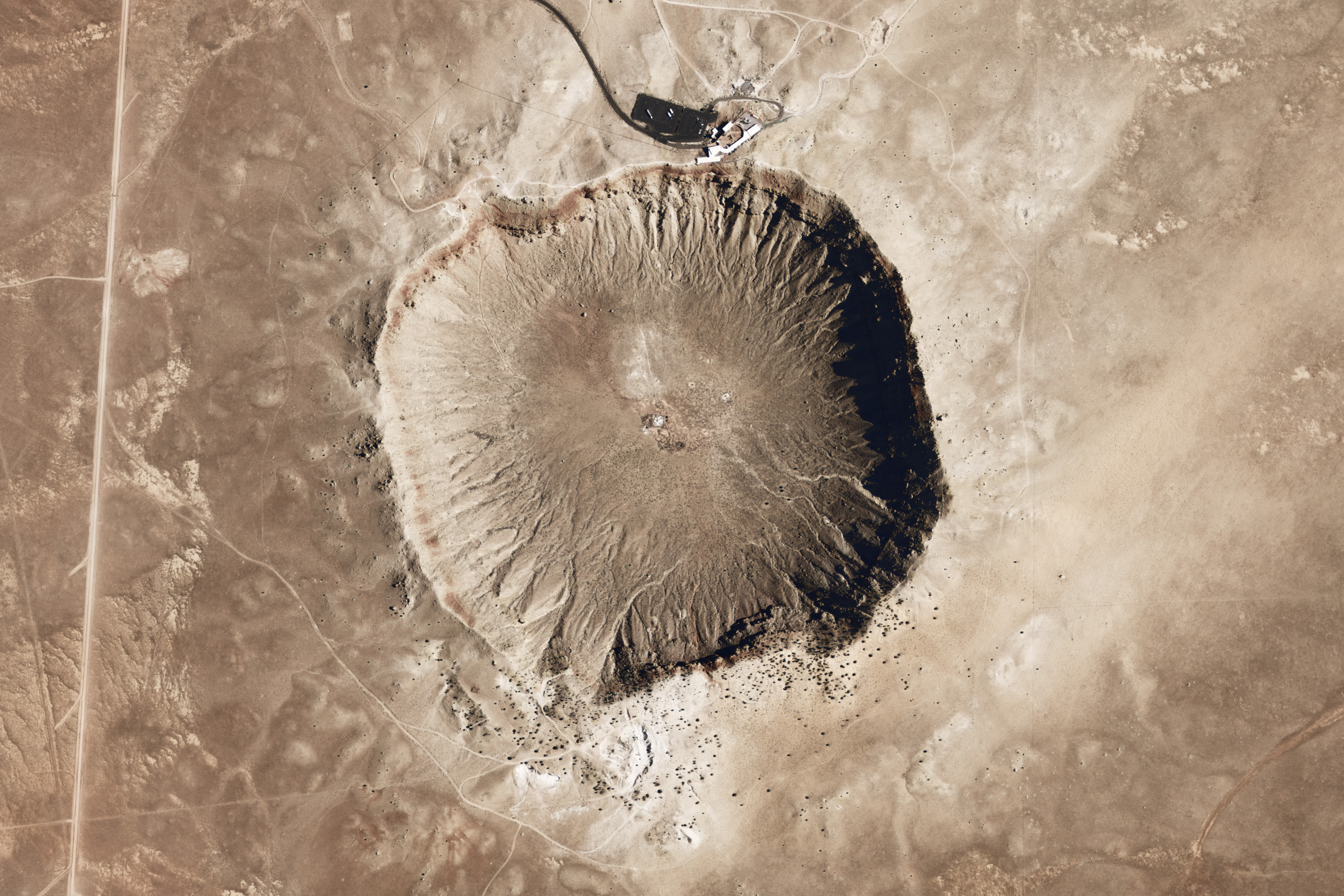
Meteor Crater, 1.2 km (0.75 mi)

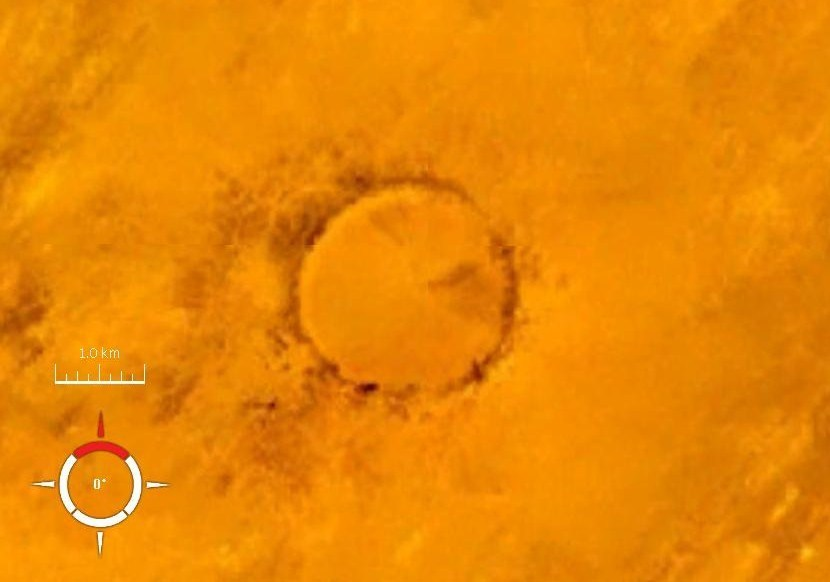
Tenoumer crater, 1.9 km (1.2 mi)

Name	Location	Country	Diameter (km)	Age (ka)	Coordinates
Yilan	Heilongjiang	China	1.85	49	46°23′4″N 129°19′39″E
Meteor/Barringer	Arizona	United States	1.2	49	35°1′39″N 111°1′22″W
Xiuyan	Xiuyan	China	1.8	50	40°21′42″N 123°27′47″E
Lonar	Maharashtra	India	1.8	576 ± 47	19°58′37″N 76°30′32″E
Agoudal	Atlas Mountains	Morocco	3.0	105	31°59′N 5°30′W
Tswaing	Pretoria Saltpan	South Africa	1.1	220	25°24′32″S 28°4′58″E
Zhamanshin	Kazakhstan	Kazakhstan	14.0	900 ± 100	48°24′0″N 60°58′0″E

=== 1 Ma to 10 Ma ===
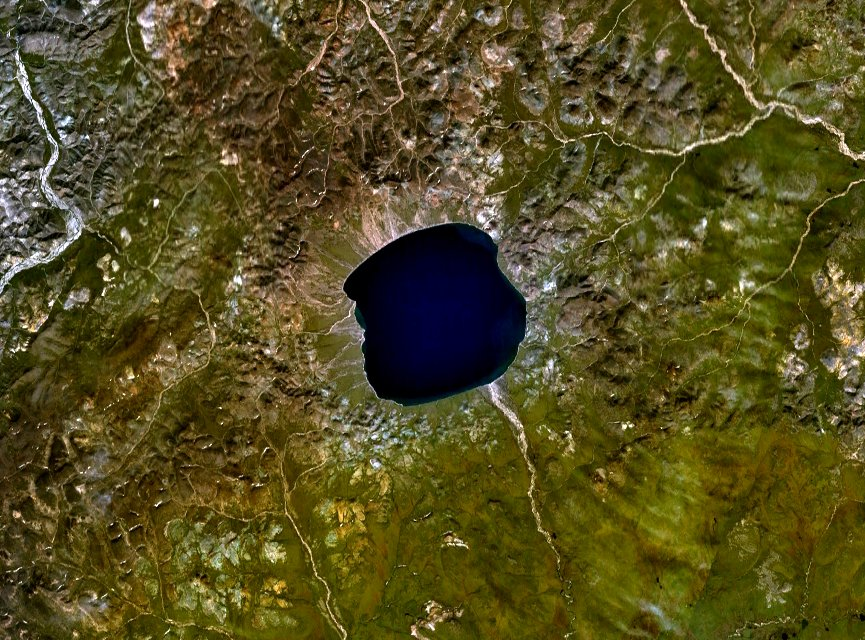
Elgygytgyn, 18 km (11 mi)

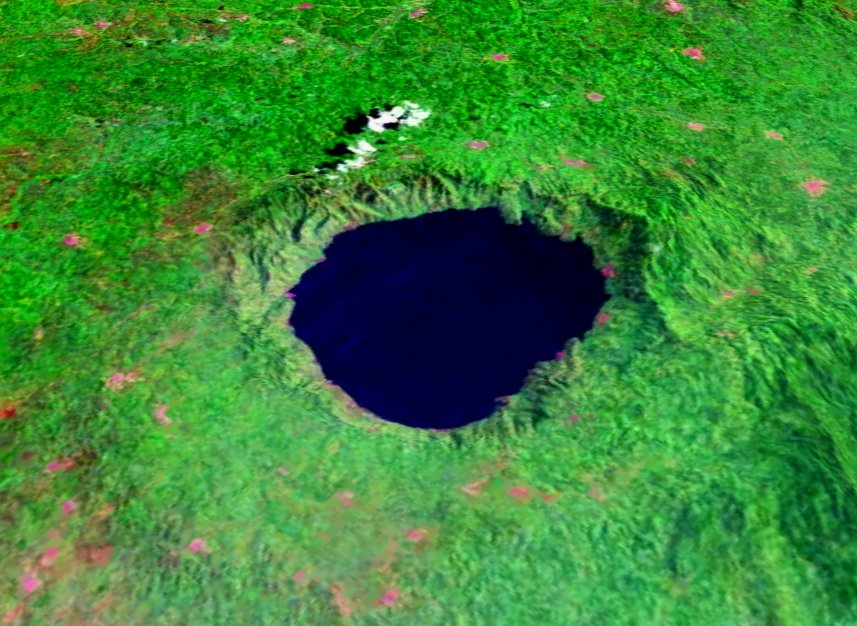
Bosumtwi, 10 km (6.2 mi)

The large but apparently craterless Eltanin impact (2.5 Ma) into the Pacific Ocean has been suggested as contributing to the glaciations and cooling during the Pliocene.

Name	Location	Country	Diameter (km)	Age (Million years)	Coordinates
Tenoumer	Sahara Desert	Mauritania	1.9	1.6 ± 0.1	22°55′2″N 10°24′28″W
Bosumtwi	Ashanti	Ghana	10	1.1	6°30′N 1°25′W
New Quebec/Pingualuit	Quebec	Canada	3.4	1.4 ± 0.1	61°16′39″N 73°39′36″W
El'gygytgyn	Chukotka Autonomous Okrug	Russia	18	3.5	67°30′N 172°00′E
Bigach	Kazakhstan	Kazakhstan	8	5	48°34′N 82°1′E
Karla	Tatarstan	Russia	10	5	54°55′N 48°2′E
Alhama de Almería	Almería	Spain	22	8	36°58′N 2°32′W
Roter Kamm	Karas	Namibia	2.4	3.8 ± 0.3	27°45′55″S 16°17′21″E
Talemzane	Djelfa	Algeria	1.6	< 3	33°18′55″N 4°02′04″E
Tsenkher	Gobi-Altai	Mongolia	3.7	4.9 ± 0.9	47°26′31″N 101°46′15″E
Aouelloul	Adrar	Mauritania	0.39	3.1 ± 0.3	

=== 10 Ma or more ===
Most recorded impact craters are over 10 million years old, or have widely uncertain ages. The Chicxulub impact has been widely considered the most likely cause for the Cretaceous–Paleogene mass extinction, and the Manicouagan impact has been less definitively linked to the Adamanian-Revueltian turnover and a possible marine extinction event. Some scholars have linked other impacts like the Popigai impact in Russia and the Chesapeake Bay impact to later extinction events, though the causal relationship has been questioned.

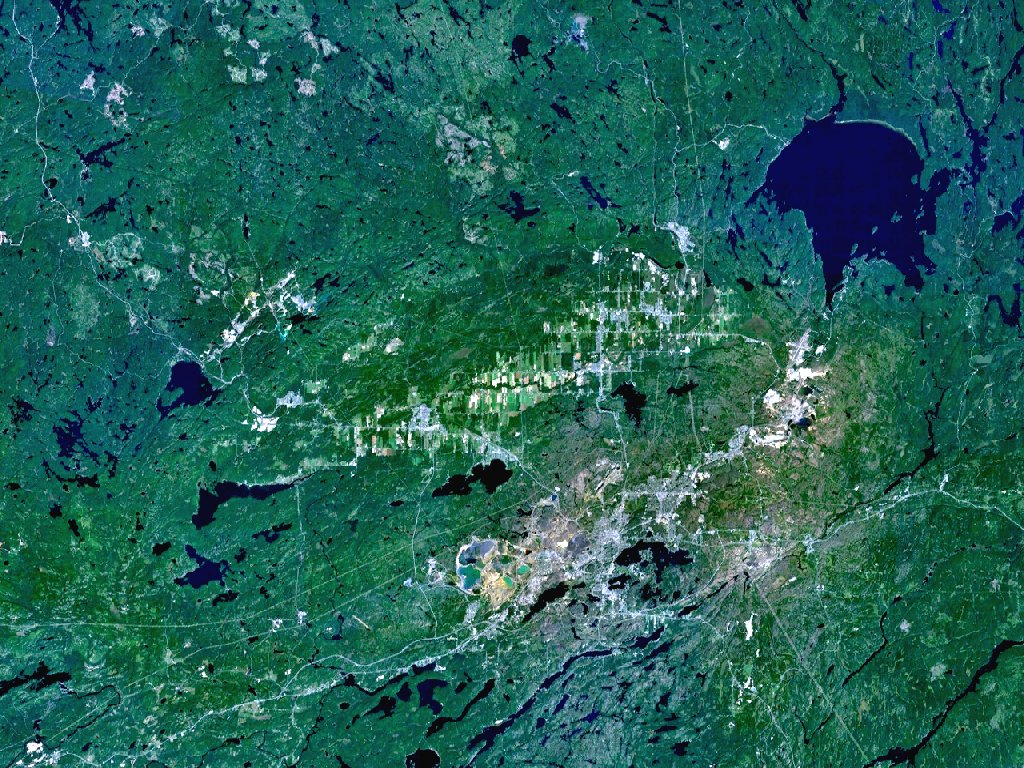
Sudbury Basin, 130 km (81 mi)

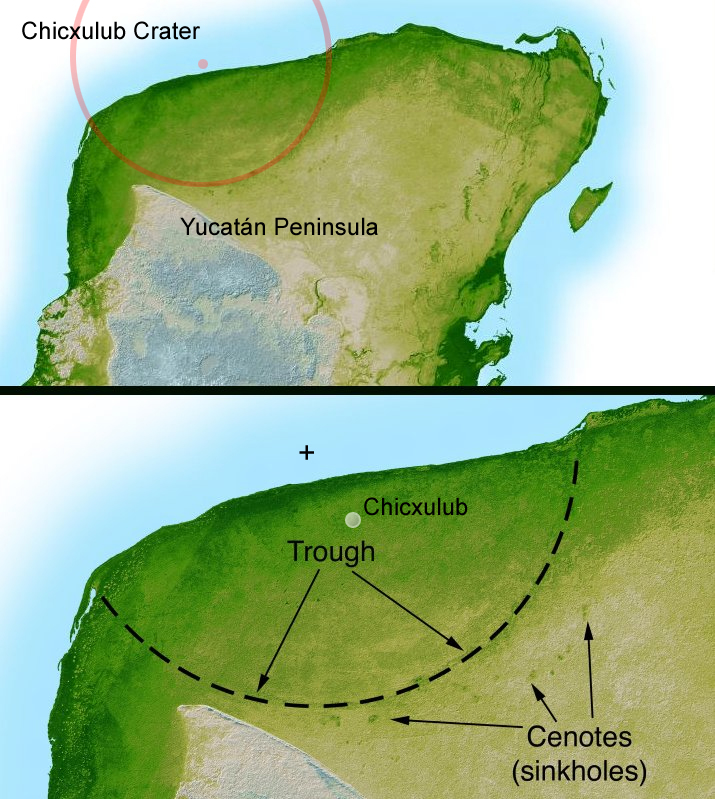
Chicxulub crater, 150 km (93 mi)

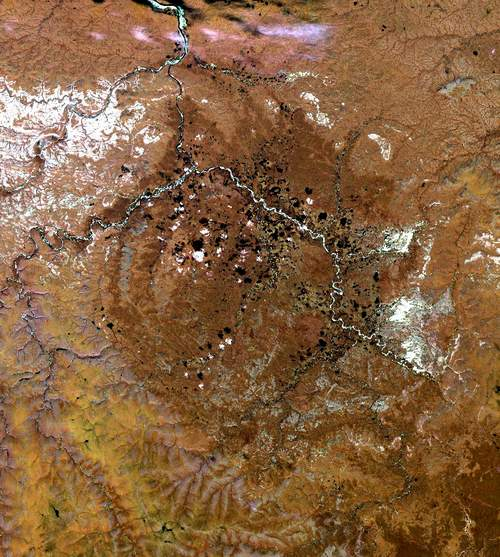
Popigai impact structure, 100 km (62 mi)

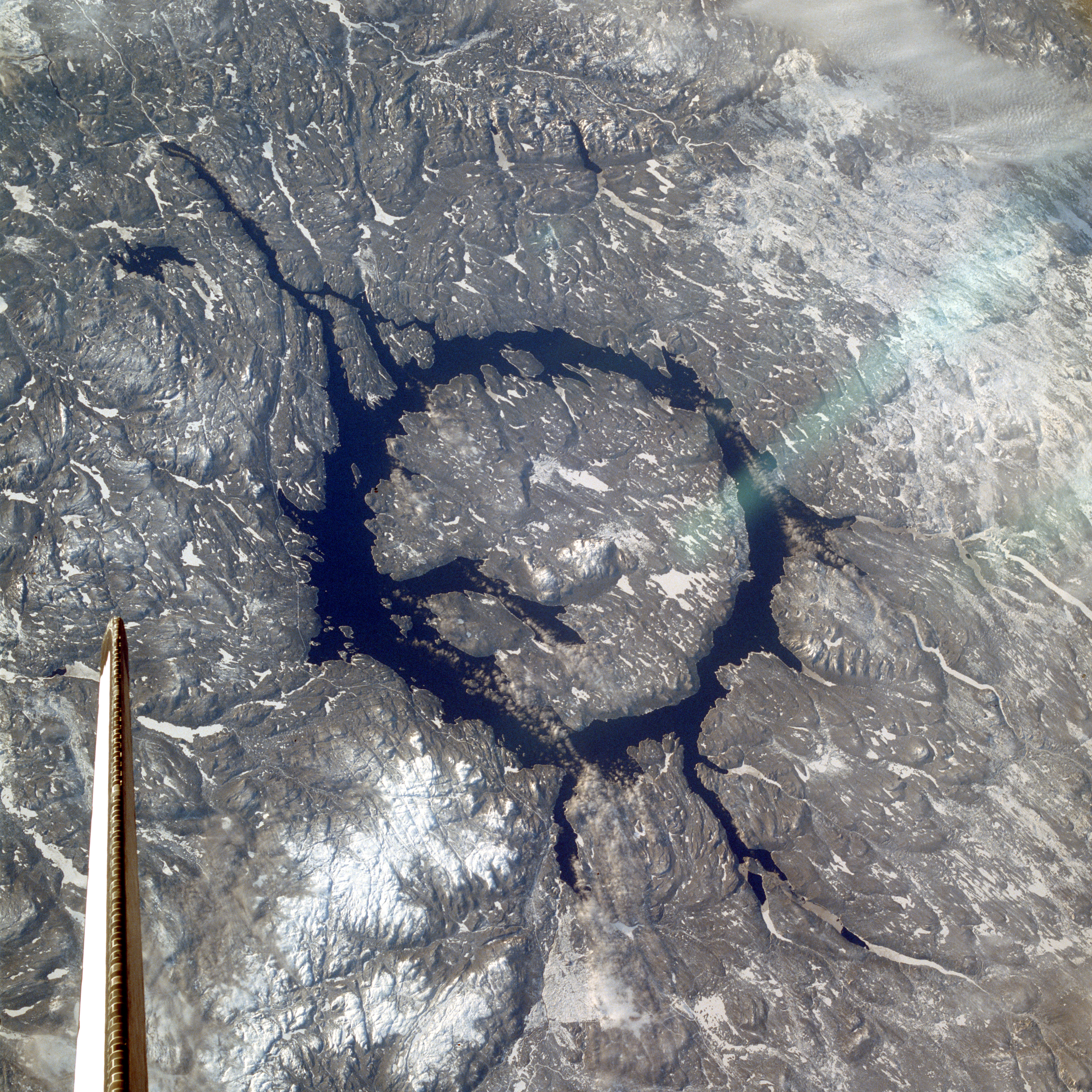
Manicouagan impact structure, 100 km (62 mi)

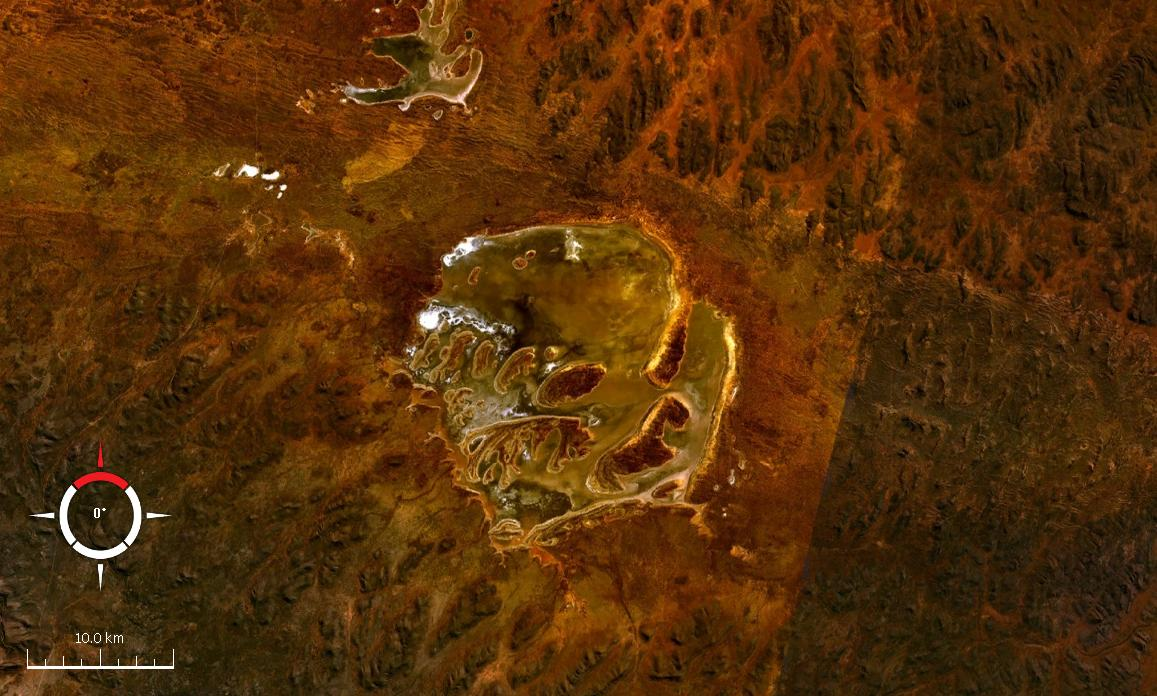
Acraman crater, 85 to 90 km (53 to 56 mi)

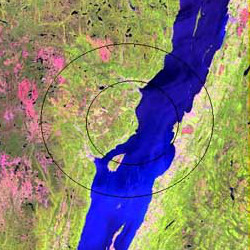
Charlevoix impact structure, 54 km (34 mi)

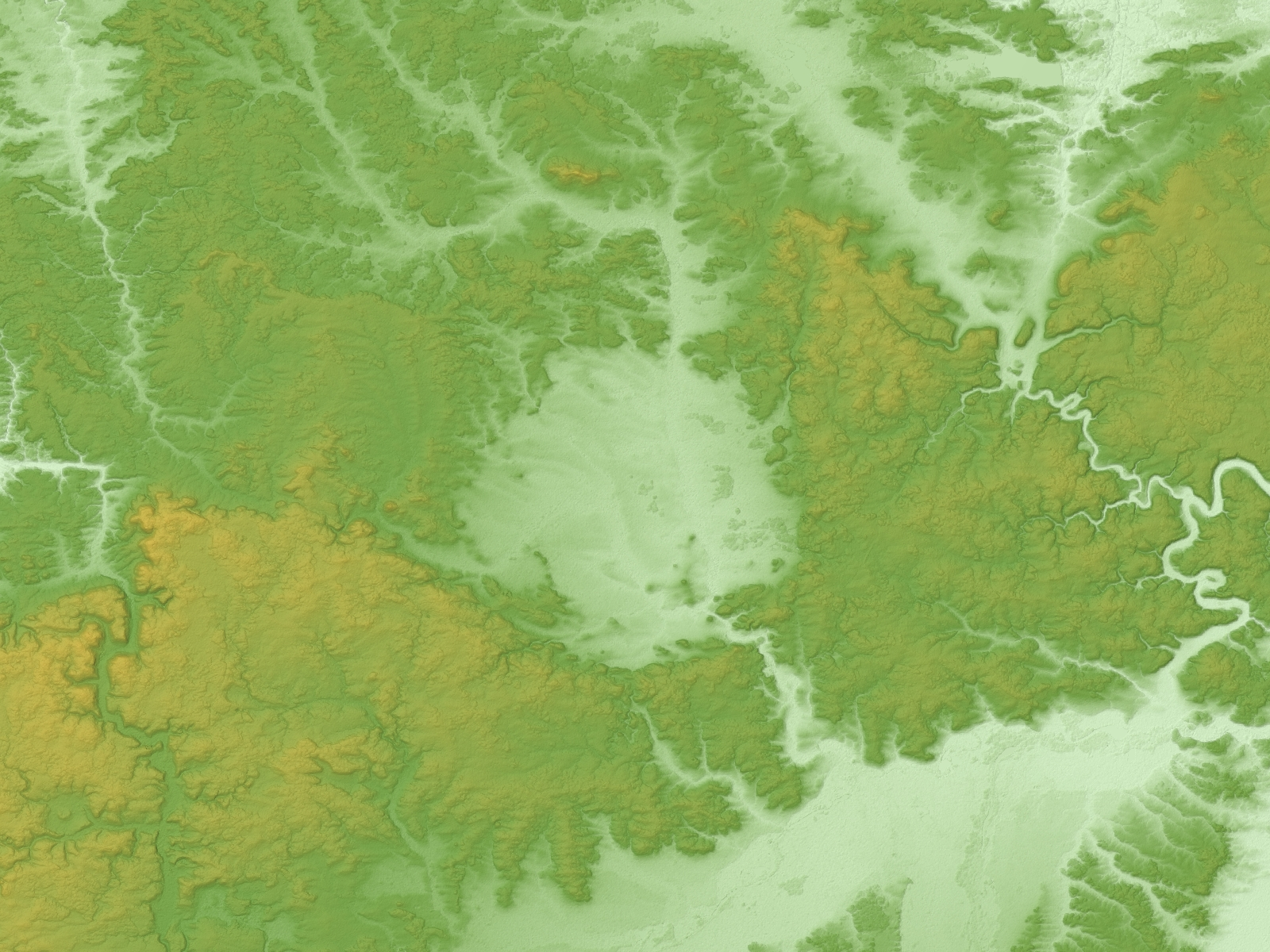
Nördlinger Ries, 24 km (15 mi)

Name	Location	Country	Diameter (km)	Age (million years)	Coordinates
Vredefort	Free State	South Africa	160	2023 ± 4	27°0′S 27°30′E
Chicxulub	Yucatán	Mexico	150	66.051 ± 0.031	21°20′N 89°30′W
Sudbury	Ontario	Canada	130	1849	46°36′N 81°11′W
Popigai	Siberia	Russia	100	35.7 ± 0.2	71°39′N 111°11′E
Manicouagan	Quebec	Canada	100	215.56 ± 0.05	51°23′N 68°42′W
Acraman	South Australia	Australia	90	580	32°1′S 135°27′E
Morokweng	Kalahari Desert	South Africa	70	146.06 ± 0.16	26°28′S 23°32′E
Kara	Nenetsia	Russia	65	75.34 ± 0.66	69°6′N 64°9′E
Beaverhead	Idaho and Montana	United States	60	600	44°15′N 114°0′W
Tookoonooka	Queensland	Australia	66	121.8–123.8	27°7′S 142°50′E
Charlevoix	Quebec	Canada	54	342	47°32′N 70°18′W
Siljan Ring	Dalarna	Sweden	65–75	380.9 ± 4.6	61°2′N 14°52′E
Karakul	Pamir Mountains	Tajikistan	52	less than 60	39°1′N 73°27′E
Montagnais	Nova Scotia	Canada	45	50.5	42°53′N 64°13′W
Araguainha	Central Brazil	Brazil	40	244.4	16°47′S 52°59′W
Chesapeake Bay	Virginia	United States	40	34.86 ± 0.23	37°17′N 76°1′W
Mjølnir	Barents Sea	Norway	40	142	73°48′N 29°40′E
Puchezh-Katunki	Nizhny Novgorod Oblast	Russia	40	195.9 ± 1.0	56°58′N 43°43′E
Saint Martin	Manitoba	Canada	40	227.8 ± 1.1	51°47′N 98°32′W
Woodleigh	Western Australia	Australia	40	364	26°3′S 114°40′E
Carswell	Saskatchewan	Canada	39	115	58°27′N 109°30′W
Clearwater West	Quebec	Canada	36	290	56°13′N 74°30′W
Manson	Iowa	United States	35	74	42°35′N 94°33′W
Hiawatha	Greenland	Denmark	31	57.99 ± 0.54	78°50′N 67°18′W
Slate Islands	Ontario	Canada	30	450	48°40′N 87°0′W
Yarrabubba	Western Australia	Australia	30	2229	27°10′S 118°50′E
Keurusselkä	Western Finland	Finland	30	1400–1500	62°8′N 24°36′E
Shoemaker	Western Australia	Australia	30	1630?	25°52′S 120°53′E
Mistastin	Newfoundland and Labrador	Canada	28	36.4	55°53′N 63°18′W
Clearwater East	Quebec	Canada	26	465	56°4′N 74°6′W
Kamensk	Southern Federal District	Russia	25	49	48°21′N 40°30′E
Steen River	Alberta	Canada	25	91	59°30′N 117°38′W
Strangways	Northern Territory	Australia	25	646	15°12′S 133°35′E
Tunnunik	Northwest Territories	Canada	25	430–450	72°28′N 113°58′W
Boltysh	Kirovohrad Oblast	Ukraine	24	65.17	48°54′N 32°15′E
Nördlinger Ries	Bavaria, Baden-Württemberg	Germany	24	14.808 ± 0.038	48°53′N 10°34′E
Presqu'île	Quebec	Canada	24	less than 500	49°43′N 74°48′W
Haughton	Nunavut	Canada	23	39	75°23′N 89°40′W
Lappajärvi	Western Finland	Finland	23	77.85 ± 0.78	63°12′N 23°42′E
Rochechouart	France	France	23	206.92 ± 0.32	45°49′N 0°47′E
Cerro do Jarau	Rio Grande do Sul	Brazil	13.5	less than 135	30°11′S 56°31′W
Cleanskin	Northern Territory	Australia	15	520–1400	18°10′S 137°56′E
Amelia Creek	Northern Territory	Australia	20	600–1640	20°55′S 134°50′E
Avak	Alaska	United States	10	90-94	
Ames	Oklahoma	United States	16	458–478	36°14′N 98°11′W
Beyenchime-Salaatin	Sakha	Russia	8	Likely less than 66	
BP	Cyrenaica	Libya	3.2	less than 120	25°19′N 24°18′E
Brent	Ontario	Canada	3.4	453.2 ± 6.0	46°4′N 78°28′W
Calvin	Michigan	United States	8.5	444–458	41°49′N 85°56′W
Chiyli	Aktobe	Kazakhstan	5.5	41–56	49°10′N 57°50′E
Chukcha	Taymyr	Russia	6	less than 70	75°38′N 98°35′E
Cloud Creek	Wyoming	United States	7	166–227	43°4′N 106°45′W
Colonia	São Paulo	Brazil	3.6	5–36	23°52′S 46°42′W
Connolly Basin	Western Australia	Australia	9	23–36	23°32′S 124°45′E
Couture	Quebec	Canada	8	429 ± 25	60°7′N 75°18′W
Crooked Creek	Missouri	United States	7	323–485	
Decaturville	Missouri	United States	6	less than 323	
Decorah	Iowa	United States	5.6	464–467	
Deep Bay	Saskatchewan	Canada	13	95–102	
Dellen	Gavleborgs	Sweden	19	140.82 ± 0.51	
Des Plaines	Illinois	United States	8	less than 299	
Dhala	Madhya Pradesh	India	11	1700–2500	
Dobele	Dobele	Latvia	4.5	252–359	
Douglas	Wyoming	United States	16	~280	
Eagle Butte	Alberta	Canada	8	less than 65	
Elbow	Saskatchewan	Canada	3.8	201–393	
Flaxman	South Australia	Australia	10	34–541	
Flynn Creek	Tennessee	United States	3.8	~382	
Foelsche	Northern Territory	Australia	6	520–1496	
Gardnos	Buskerud	Norway	5	546 ± 5	
Glasford	Illinois	United States	4	453–457	
Glikson	Western Australia	Australia	19	less than 513	
Glover Bluff	Wisconsin	United States	8	less than 485	
Goat Paddock	Western Australia	Australia	5	48–56	
Gosses Bluff	Northern Territory	Australia	32	165–383	23°49′S 132°18′E
Gow	Saskatchewan	Canada	4	196.8 ± 9.9	
Goyder	Northern Territory	Australia	7	150–1325	
Granby	Ostergotland	Sweden	3	478–468	
Gweni-Fada	Ennedi	Chad	22	less than 383	
Holleford	Ontario	Canada	2.35	450–650	
Hummeln	Småland	Sweden	1.2	~465	
Ile Rouleau	Quebec	Canada	4	less than 300	
Ilkurlka	Western Australia	Australia	12	"Middle Cambrian"	
Ilyinets	Vinnytsia	Ukraine	4.5	445 ± 10	
Iso-Naakkima	Mikkeli	Finland	3	900–1200	
Jake Seller Draw	Wyoming	United States	4.3	280	
Jänisjärvi	Karelia	Russia	14	687 ± 5	
Jabel Waqf as Suwwan	Ma'an	Jordan	5.5	2.6–30	
Kaluga	Kaluga	Russia	15	383–394	
Kamenetsk	Mykolaiv	Ukraine	1.2	11.63–2100	
Kardla	Hiiu	Estonia	4	~455	
Karikkoselkä	Central Finland	Finland	2.1–2.4	230–260	
Kelly West	Northern Territory	Australia	6.6	500–1640	
Kentland	Indiana	United States	7	less than 97	
Kgagodi	Central District	Botswana	3.4	less than 180	
Kursk	Kursk	Russia	5.5	163–359	
La Moinerie	Quebec	Canada	8	453 ± 5	
Lake Raeside	Western Australia	Australia	11	34–250	
Lawn Hill	Queensland	Australia	16.8	476 ± 8	
Liverpool	Northern Territory	Australia	1.6	541–1870	
Lockne	Jämtland	Sweden	13.5	~455	
Logancha	Siberia	Russia	20	40	65°31′N 95°56′E
Logoisk	Minsk	Belarus	17	30 ± 0.5	
Luizi	Katanga	Dem. Rep. of the Congo	15	less than 573	
Lumparn	Southwest Finland	Finland	10	less than 458	
Malingen	Jämtland	Sweden	0.7	~455	
Maple Creek	Saskatchewan	Canada	5.75	less than 72	
Marquez	Texas	United States	12.7	58.3 ± 3.1	
Matt Wilson	Northern Territory	Australia	7.5	less than 1344	
Middlesboro	Kentucky	United States	5.5	less than 299	
Mien	Kronoberg	Sweden	7	120 ± 1	
Mishina Gora	Pskov	Russia	2.5	less than 360	
Mizarai	Alytus	Lithuania	5	480–520	
Mount Toondina	South Australia	Australia	4	less than 125	
Neugrund	Harju	Estonia	20	530–540	
Newporte	North Dakota	United States	3.2	480–500	
Nicholson	Northwest Territories	Canada	12.5	387 ± 5	
Nova Colinas	Maranhao	Brazil	7	Unknown	
Oasis	Kufra	Libya	18	less than 120	
Obolon'	Poltava Oblast	Ukraine	20	169	49°35′N 32°55′E
Ora Banda	Western Australia	Australia	5	100	
Ouarkziz	Tindouf	Algeria	3	65–345	
Paasselkä	Mikkeli	Finland	10	231.0 ± 2.2	
Pilot	Northwest Territories	Canada	~6	450 ± 2	
Presqu'île	Quebec	Canada	15	less than 2729	
Ragozinka	Sverdlovsk	Russia	9	56–59	
Ramgarh	Rajasthan	India	10	165–750	
Red Wing	North Dakota	United States	9	167–250	
Riachão	Maranhao	Brazil	4	less than 299	
Ritland	Rogaland	Norway	2.7	500–541	
Rock Elm	Wisconsin	United States	6.5	458–485	
Rotmistrovka	Cherkasy	Ukraine	2.7	94–145	
Sääksjärvi	Western Finland	Finland	5	602 ± 17	
Saarijärvi	Oulu	Finland	2	less than 600	
Santa Fe	New Mexico	United States	13	350–1200	
Santa Marta	Piaui	Brazil	10	less than 100	
Saqqar	Jawf	Saudi Arabia	34	70–410	
Serpent Mound	Ohio	United States	8	less than 359	
Serra da Cangalha	Tocantins	Brazil	13.7	less than 250	
Shunak	Karaganda	Kazakhstan	2.8	7–17	
Sierra Madera	Texas	United States	20	less than 113	
Söderfjärden	Ostrobothnia	Finland	6.5	640	
Spider	Western Australia	Australia	13	580–900	
Steinheim	Baden-Württemberg	Germany	3.8	~14.8	
Suavjärvi	Karelia	Russia	16	2200–2700	
Summasjärvi	Western Finland	Finland	2.6	less than 1880	
Suvasvesi North	Northern Savonia	Finland	3.5	~85	
Suvasvesi South	Northern Savonia	Finland	3.8	710–1880	
Tabun-Khara-Obo	Dornogovi	Mongolia	1.3	130–170	
Talundilly	Queensland	Australia	84	~125	
Ternovka	Dnipropetrovsk	Ukraine	15	280 ± 10	
Tin Bider	Tamanrasset	Algeria	6	less than 66	
Tvaren	Södermanland	Sweden	3.1	456–458	
Upheaval Dome	Utah	United States	5.2	less than 183	
Vargeao Dome	Santa Catarina	Brazil	12.4	123 ± 1.4	
Vepriai	Vilnius	Lithuania	7.5	155–165	
Viewfield	Saskatchewan	Canada	2.4	170–210	
Vista Alegre	Paraná	Brazil	9.5	111–134	
Wanapitei	Ontario	Canada	7.5	37.7 ± 1.2	
Wells Creek	Tennessee	United States	13.7	100–323	
West Hawk	Manitoba	Canada	3.6	351 ± 20	
Wetumpka	Alabama	United States	6.25	~83.5	
Yallalie	Western Australia	Australia	12	83.6–89.8	
Zapadnaya	Zhytomyr	Ukraine	3.2	165 ± 5	
Zeleny Gai	Kirovograd	Ukraine	3.5	60–100	
Miralga	Western Australia	Australia	40–45	~3024	21°02′54″S 119°23′35″E
Uhackatik	Quebec	Canada	~25	~390	51°12′N 64°42′W

== Inferred impact events ==
Some impact events are only known from events like layers of spherules or tektites generated by the impact recorded in contemporary rocks, and their impact structures may no longer exist.

Name	Location	Country	Diameter (km)	Age (million years)	Coordinates
Eltanin impact	Southern Ocean	Bellingshausen Sea southwest of Chile (layer of unmelted and melted meteoritic debris found in deep sea cores)	none	2.5	57°47′S 90°47′W
Australasian strewnfield	Unknown (likely Southeast Asia)	Unknown	Unknown, possibly c. 15	0.788	N/A
Nuussuaq (Disko) spherule bed	Unknown	Unknown (spherule bed found in Nuussuaq Peninsula, Western Greenland)	Unknown	c. 61–62	N/A
Qidong spherule bed	Unknown	Unknown (spherule bed found near Qidong, Hunan, China)	Unknown	c. 374	N/A
Senzeilles (Hony) microtektite bed	Unknown	Unknown (microtektite bed found in Belgium)	Unknown	c. 376	N/A
Osmussaar breccia	eastern Gulf of Finland region	Unknown (breccia layer found in Estonia)	Unknown	c. 466	N/A
Vakkejokk Breccia	Northern Scandinavia	Likely northern Sweden (proximal ejecta layer found in the North-Swedish Caledonides)	c. 4–5	c. 520	N/A
Kitkiöjärvi impact melt	Northern Scandinavia	Likely either northern Sweden or northern Finland (impact melt rock found in glacial deposits in gravel pit)	Unknown	658.9 ± 6.9	N/A
Unnamed	Northern Greenland	Denmark (impact melt rock found in glaciofluvial deposits in Inglefield Land, Greenland)	Unknown	1039 ± 16	N/A
Stac Fada Member	Scotland	Scotland (proximal ejecta layer found in Scotland)	Likely around 13–14	990 ± 20	N/A
Paraburdoo-Reivilo spherule bed	Unknown	Unknown (spherule beds found in South Africa and Australia)	Unknown	c. 2570	N/A
Monteville-Carawine-Jeerinah spherule bed	Unknown	Unknown (spherule beds found in South Africa and Australia)	Unknown	c. 2630	N/A
S1-Warrawoona spherule bed	Unknown	Unknown (spherule beds found in South Africa and Australia)	Likely in the range of 400–1000	c. 3472	N/A
S2 spherule bed	Unknown	Unknown (spherule beds found in South Africa)	Estimated to be around 500	c. 3260	N/A
S3 spherule bed	Unknown	Unknown (spherule beds found in South Africa)	Likely in the range of 400-1000	c. 3243	N/A
S4 spherule bed	Unknown	Unknown (spherule beds found in South Africa)	Likely in the range of 400-1000	c. 3240	N/A
S5 spherule bed	Unknown	Unknown (spherule beds found in South Africa)	Likely in the range of 400-1000	c. 3225	N/A
S6 spherule bed	Unknown	Unknown (spherule beds found in South Africa)	Likely in the range of 400-1000	c. 3256	N/A
S7 spherule bed	Unknown	Unknown (spherule beds found in South Africa)	Likely in the range of 400-1000	c. 3416	N/A
S8 spherule bed	Unknown	Unknown (spherule beds found in South Africa)	Likely in the range of 400-1000	c. 3298	N/A

== Statistics of impact structures by continent ==
As of 2022, the Earth Impact Database (EID) contains 190 confirmed impact structures. The table below is arranged by the continent's percentage of the Earth's land area, and where Asian and Russian structures are grouped together per EID convention.

The global distribution of known impact structures apparently shows a surprising asymmetry, with the small but well-funded European continent having a large percentage of confirmed impact structures. As meteorites impacting Earth should impact evenly across the surface, it is suggested this situation is an artifact, highlighting the importance of intensifying research in less studied areas like Antarctica, South America and elsewhere.

Continent	Continent's % of Earth's land area	Continent's % of the 190 known impact structures	Number of impact structures
Asia and Russia	30%	16%	31
Africa	20%	11%	20
North America	16%	32%	60
South America	12%	6%	11
Antarctica	9%	0%	1
Europe	7%	22%	41
Australia	6%	14%	27
Total	100%	100%	190

== See also ==
- Bolide – Extremely bright meteor
- Earth Impact Database – Database of impact structures on Earth
- Extinction event – Rapid decrease in Earth's biodiversity
- Impact event – Collision of two astronomical objects
- Impact Field Studies Group
- List of craters in the Solar System
- List of largest craters in the Solar System
- List of possible impact structures on Earth
- Traces of Catastrophe – Comprehensive technical reference on the science of impact craters
- Giant-impact hypothesis – Hypothesis of the formation of the Moon
- Deniliquin multiple-ring feature – Buried feature in south-east Australia, suggested to be an impact structure (520-kilometre (320 mi))-diameter strcture would be the largest one on Earth)
