= 9564 Jeffwynn =

Asteroid

Discovery
- Discovered by: C. S. Shoemaker; E. M. Shoemaker
- Discovery site: Palomar Obs.
- Discovery date: 26 September 1987

Designations
- Named after: Jeffrey Wynn (American geophysicist)
- Alternative designations: 1987 SG_{3} · 1951 NQ
- Minor planet category: Mars-crosser

Orbital characteristics
- Epoch 4 September 2017 (JD 2458000.5)
- Uncertainty parameter 0
- Observation arc: 65.68 yr (23,988 days)
- Aphelion: 3.0828 AU
- Perihelion: 1.5962 AU
- Semi-major axis: 2.3395 AU
- Eccentricity: 0.3177
- Orbital period (sidereal): 3.58 yr (1,307 days)
- Mean anomaly: 159.61°
- Mean motion: 0° 16^{m} 31.44^{s} / day
- Inclination: 22.307°
- Longitude of ascending node: 187.10°
- Argument of perihelion: 121.61°

Physical characteristics
- Dimensions: 4.71 km (calculated)
- Synodic rotation period: 3.035±0.001 h (Note: Warner (2012): lightcurve plot of (9564) Jeffwynn with a rotation period 3.0350±0.001 hours and a brightness amplitude of 0.16 mag. Summary figures at Collaborative Asteroid Lightcurve Link (CALL))
- Geometric albedo: 0.20 (assumed)
- Spectral type: S
- Absolute magnitude (H): 13.00 · 14.0 · 14.52±0.76

9564 Jeffwynn, provisional designation 1987 SG_{3}, is an eccentric asteroid and Mars-crosser from the inner regions of the asteroid belt, approximately 4.7 kilometers in diameter.

The asteroid was discovered on 26 September 1987, by American astronomer couple Carolyn and Eugene Shoemaker at Palomar Observatory in California, United States. It was named for American geophysicist Jeffrey C. Wynn.

== Orbit and classification ==
Jeffwynn is a stony asteroid that orbits the Sun at a distance of 1.6–3.1 AU once every 3 years and 7 months (1,307 days). Its orbit has an eccentricity of 0.32 and an inclination of 22° with respect to the ecliptic.

The body's observation arc begins 36 years prior to its official discovery observation, with its precovery identification as 1951 NQ at Palomar in July 1951.

== Physical characteristics ==
Jeffwynn has been characterized as a common, stony S-type asteroid by photometry from the Sloan Digital Sky Survey.

=== Lightcurves ===
In September 2012, a rotational lightcurve of Jeffwynn was obtained from photometric observations by American astronomer Brian Warner at his Palmer Divide Observatory (716) in Colorado. Lightcurve analysis gave a well-defined rotation period of 3.035 hours with a brightness variation of 0.16 magnitude (U=3).

=== Diameter and albedo ===
The Collaborative Asteroid Lightcurve Link calculates a diameter of 4.7 kilometers with an absolute magnitude of 14.0 and an assumed albedo for stony asteroids of 0.20.

== Naming ==
This minor planet was named in honor of American Jeffrey C. Wynn, research geophysicist with the United States Geological Survey, described as a "humorous, curious, inventive, adventurous geophysicist", who examined the Saudi Arabian Wabar craters on several expeditions in 1994 and 1995, together with Eugene Shoemaker, after whom the minor planet 2074 Shoemaker is named. Wynn's research included mapping the seafloor, analyzing terrestrial minerals, and studying aquifers and archaeological sites. He also observed with the comet-discovering Shoemaker-Levy team. The official naming citation was published by the Minor Planet Center on 23 November 1999 (M.P.C. 36948).
