= Russian meteor =

Russian meteor and related terms may refer to:

- Chelyabinsk meteor, 2013 superbolide event over Chelyabinsk Oblast, Russia
- Tunguska event, explosion in Siberia in 1908, suspected to have been a large meteor airburst
- List of impact craters in Asia and Russia
- Meteor (satellite), a Russian spacecraft

== See also ==
- Category:Meteorites found in Russia
