= List of impact structures in Antarctica =

This List of impact structures in Antarctica includes only unconfirmed and theoretical impact sites in Antarctica and the surrounding waters of the Southern Ocean. There are not yet any confirmed impact sites in Antarctica according to the Earth Impact Database.

== Unconfirmed impact structures ==
The following craters are officially considered "unconfirmed" because they are not listed in the Earth Impact Database. Due to stringent requirements regarding evidence and peer-reviewed publication, newly discovered craters or those with difficulty collecting evidence generally are known for some time before becoming listed. However, entries on the unconfirmed list could still have an impact origin disproven.

Antarctica

Name	Location	Diameter	Age	Coordinates	Source
Bowers	Antarctica	100 km	unknown	71.2°S 176°E	IFSG
Ross	Antarctica	550 km	Oligocene	77.5°S 178.5°E	IFSG
Wilkes Land	Wilkes Land, Antarctica	485 km	<500 million?	70°S 120°E	see article

== See also ==
- Impact craters
- Impact events
- Bolides and Meteorites
- Earth Impact Database – primary source
- Traces of Catastrophe book from Lunar and Planetary Institute - comprehensive reference on impact crater science
