= Jeffrey C. Wynn =

American geologist, geophysicist

Jeff Wynn
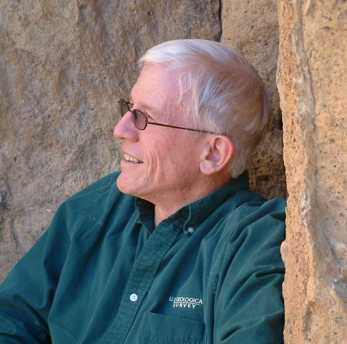
- Born: Bakersfield, California
- Education: University of Arizona, University of California, Berkeley
- Scientific career
- Fields: Earth sciences: geophysics, geology, hydrology, volcanology; oceanography, archeology
- Workplaces: US Geological Survey

Jeffrey C. Wynn is a research geophysicist with the United States Geological Survey (USGS). He is currently based in the Cascades Volcano Observatory in Vancouver, WA, one of the five USGS volcano observatories in the United States .

== Professional career ==
Wynn has served as vice president for R&D of Zonge International, and in several rotational management positions in the USGS. These include Chief Scientist for Volcano Hazards, Chief of the Office of Geochemistry & Geophysics, Chief of the Venezuelan Guayana & Amazonas Exploration Mission ("Jefe del Grupo Asesor"), where he was first author of the first complete geologic map of southern Venezuela, and also published a full assessment of discovered and undiscovered mineral resources for the roadless southern half of Venezuela. Wynn also served for four years as the Deputy Chief for Science and Chief of the USGS Saudi Arabian Mission before assuming responsibility for volcano research and monitoring as Chief Scientist for Volcano Hazards in the USGS.

Wynn has studied and published on the historical era Wabar craters asteroid impact event in the Empty Quarter of Saudi Arabia. He has also developed a new technology for mapping sub-seafloor minerals, buried wrecks, buried oil and gas infrastructure, and migrating hydrocarbon plumes in the open ocean using a physical property called induced polarization ("IP"). He has also done extensive geophysical mapping in SE Alaska.

Wynn co-developed an airborne electromagnetic technology to rapidly map groundwater deep beneath arid basins in 3D. Using this technology, he successfully mapped the groundwater of the San Pedro Basin in southern Arizona and northern (Sonora), Mexico in three dimensions.

== Publications ==
He has published over 300 articles, books, patents, and maps in fields as diverse as geology, oceanography, hydrology, geophysics, archeology, and astrophysics.

Wynn is a past president of the Environmental & Engineering Geophysical Society (2002–2003).. He has also served as Special Editor of Geophysics and is currently an Associate Editor of Exploration Geophysics.

== Self Defense ==
Wynn holds a 7th degree black belt (Shihan or Master Teacher) in Japanese origin Jujutsu and 6th degree black belt in Taiho-Jutsu.

As a community service he has taught over 3,000 women for free, along with his senior black belts, self-defense clinics in northern Virginia and southwestern Washington State . He has provided self-defense training to agents of the Washington State Department of Revenue . He also teaches quarterly self-defense classes at Clark College, and Washington State University - Vancouver.

== Awards ==
In 1999 the Mars-crossing asteroid 9564 Jeffwynn was named in his honor. It was discovered by astronomers Carolyn and Eugene Shoemaker at Palomar Observatory in 1987.

He has been awarded three patents on marine IP, most recently in June 2013 for mapping hydrocarbons in the open ocean, with one more pending. A commercial version of the towed-streamer technology was successfully tested in the Bismarck Sea in February 2005 and off the east coast of South Africa in a successful large-scale commercial sub-seafloor mineral resource mapping deployment during May - June 2007. In 2018 a consortium was formed (Induced Polarization Associates) to commercialize the "Wynn" patents.
