= Macha crater =

Terrestrial crater field

Macha Crater
- Location within Asia
- Location: Russia; 60°05′09″N 117°39′07″E

Impact crater structure
- Confidence: Hypothetical
- Diameter: 60 to 300 m (200 to 980 ft)
- Age: 7.3 Ka

The Sakha Republic

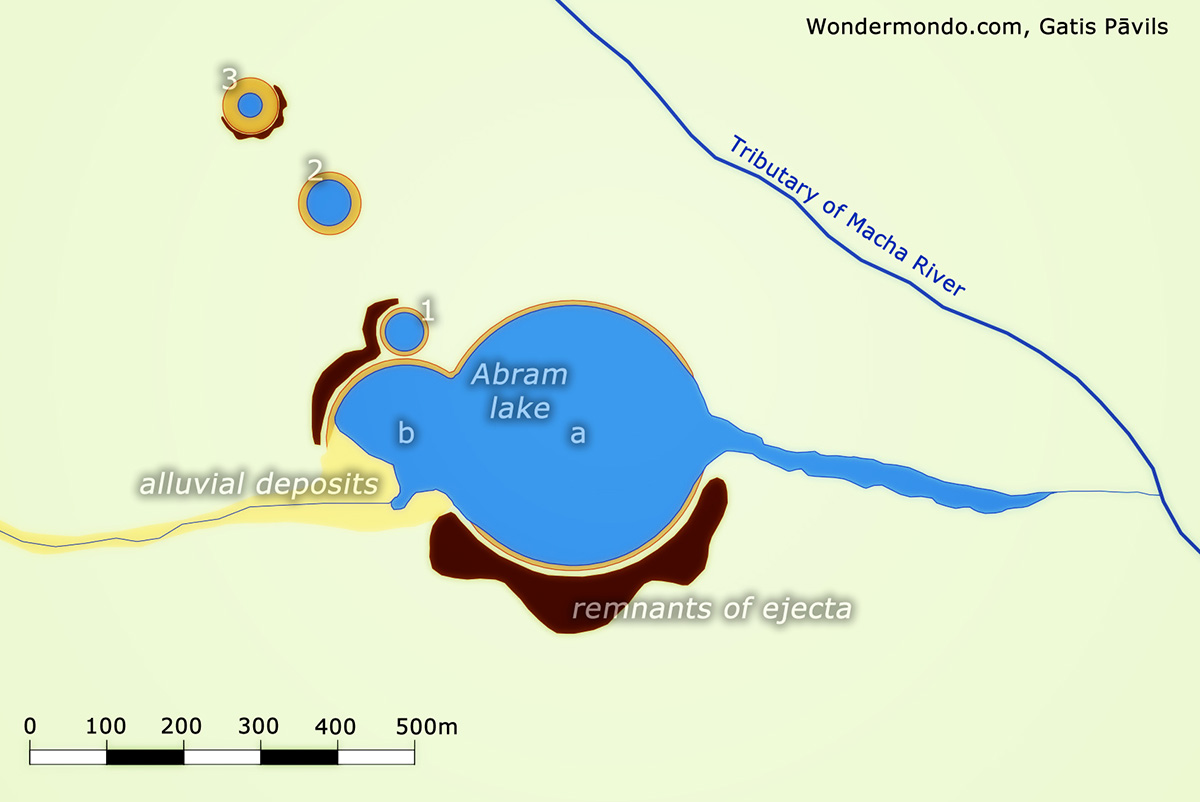
Macha crater field map

Macha (Russian: Мача) is a field of five meteorite craters located 685 kilometers (425 miles) west-southwest of Yakutsk in the Sakha Republic in Siberia, Russia, ranging from 60 to 300 m (200 to 980 ft) in diameter.

The two largest craters form the pear-shaped Abram Lake while the remaining three are located to the north. They have been very well preserved. The largest crater in the Macha crater field is the second-largest Holocene-era crater yet discovered, after Jinlin Crater in China.

The craters are the result of the fall of possible iron meteorites at approximately 5300 BCE (Holocene), which would give them an age of about 7,300 years.

== See also ==
- List of impact craters on Earth
