= Popigai impact structure =

Impact crater in Siberia, Russia

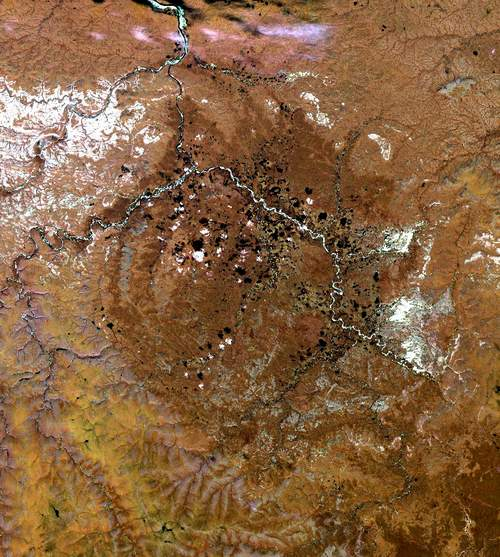
- Landsat image of Popigai crater

- Location within Russia
- Location: Krasnoyarsk Krai, Russia; 71°39′N 111°11′E

Impact crater structure
- Confidence: Confirmed
- Diameter: 90 km (56 mi)
- Age: 35.7 ± 0.2 Ma; Late Eocene
- Exposed: Yes
- Drilled: Yes
- Bolide type: H chondrite

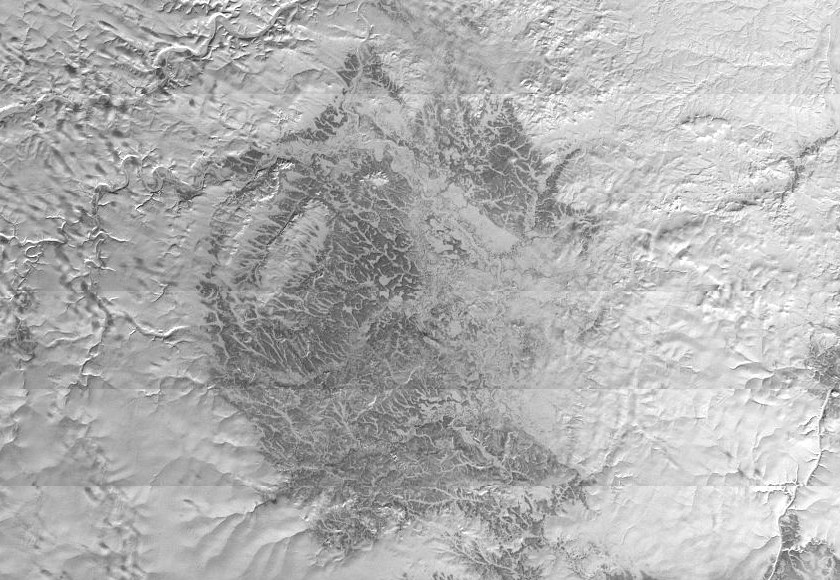
Popigai crater in April 1967

The Popigai impact structure is the eroded remnant of an impact crater in northern Siberia, Russia. It is tied with the Acraman impact structure as the fourth largest verified impact structure on Earth. A large bolide impact created the 100-kilometre-diameter (62 mi) crater approximately 35 million years ago during the late Eocene epoch (Priabonian stage). It might be linked to the Eocene–Oligocene extinction event.

The structure is 300 km (190 mi) east from the outpost of Khatanga and 880 km (550 mi) northeast of the city of Norilsk, NNE of the Anabar Plateau. It is designated by UNESCO as a Geopark, a site of special geological heritage. There is a small possibility that the Popigai impact crater may have formed simultaneously with the approximately 35-million-year-old Chesapeake Bay and Toms Canyon impact craters.

For decades, the Popigai impact structure has fascinated paleontologists and geologists, but the entire area was completely off limits because of the diamonds found there. However, a major investigatory expedition was undertaken in 1997, which greatly advanced understanding of the structure. The impactor is suggested to have been a H chondrite asteroid based on ejecta layers from Italy, with the impactor thought to have been several kilometres in diameter.

The shock pressures from the impact instantaneously transformed graphite in the ground into diamonds within a 13.6 km (8.5 mi) radius of the impact point. These diamonds are usually 0.5 to 2 mm (0.020 to 0.079 in) in diameter, though a few exceptional specimens are 10 mm (0.39 in) in size. The diamonds inherited the tabular shape of the original graphite grains and also the original crystals' delicate striations.

== Diamond deposits ==
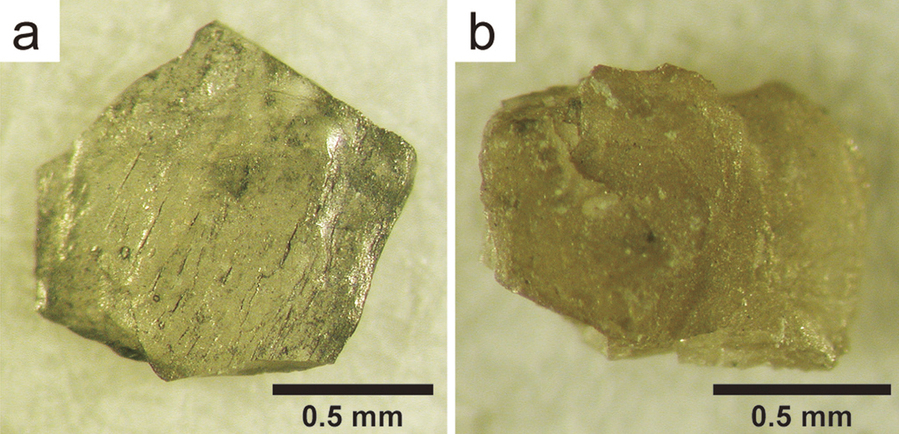
Popigai diamonds are about 1 mm in size and consist of nanodiamond agglomerates.

Most modern industrial diamonds are produced synthetically. The diamond deposits at Popigai have not been mined because of the remote location and lack of infrastructure, and are unlikely to be competitive with synthetic diamonds. Many of the diamonds at Popigai contain crystalline lonsdaleite, an allotrope of carbon that has a hexagonal lattice. Pure, laboratory-created lonsdaleite is up to 58% harder than ordinary diamonds. These types of diamonds are known as "impact diamonds" because they are thought to be produced when a meteorite strikes a graphite deposit at high velocity. They may have industrial uses but are unsuitable as gems.

Additionally, carbon polymorphs, a combination of diamond and lonsdaleite even harder than pure lonsdaleite, have been discovered in the crater.

== See also ==
- List of impact craters on Earth
- List of possible impact structures on Earth
- Logancha crater – Meteorite crater in Siberia, Russia
