= Cleanskin crater =

Impact structure

Coordinates: 18°10′00″S 137°56′30″E

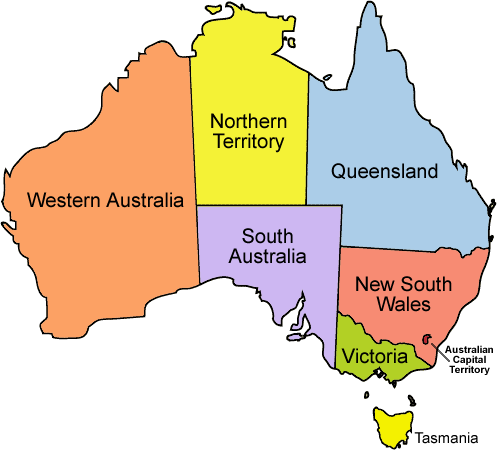
This crater is located on the border between the Northern Territory and Queensland.

The Cleanskin crater is an eroded impact structure located in Australia situated on the border between the Northern territory and Queensland. It has a diameter of 15 kilometers and polygonal shaped which is caused by preexisting regional faults. The central uplift has a relatively shallow height of 6 kilometers.

It formed during the late Mesoproterozoic to Neoproterozoic eras. The crater became eroded by the Cambrian period and buried under Cretaceous strata.
