= Jabel Waqf as Suwwan crater =

Coordinates: 31°2′50″N 36°48′18″E

- Location within Jordan
- Location: Ma'an Governorate, Jordan

Impact crater structure
- Diameter: 5.5 kilometres (3.4 mi)
- Age: 37–56 Ma

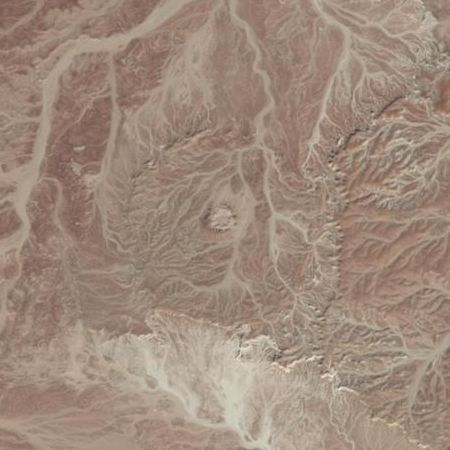
Jebel Waqf as Suwwan

The Jabal Waqf es Suwwan crater is an impact crater in Ma'an Governorate, Jordan, near the Saudi border.

The crater has a diameter of 5.5 kilometres (3.4 mi). It is estimated at 37–56 million years old. It is exposed at the surface.

The crater was proposed in 2006 by geologists Elias Salameh and Hani N. Khoury from the University of Jordan, along with German professor Werner Schneider. The bolide is estimated by Prof. Salameh to have been 100m in diameter, and to have had an impact velocity of 40–50 km/s.

== See Also ==
- Wabar Craters
- List of impact craters on Earth
