= Puchezh-Katunki crater =

Meteor crater located in Russia

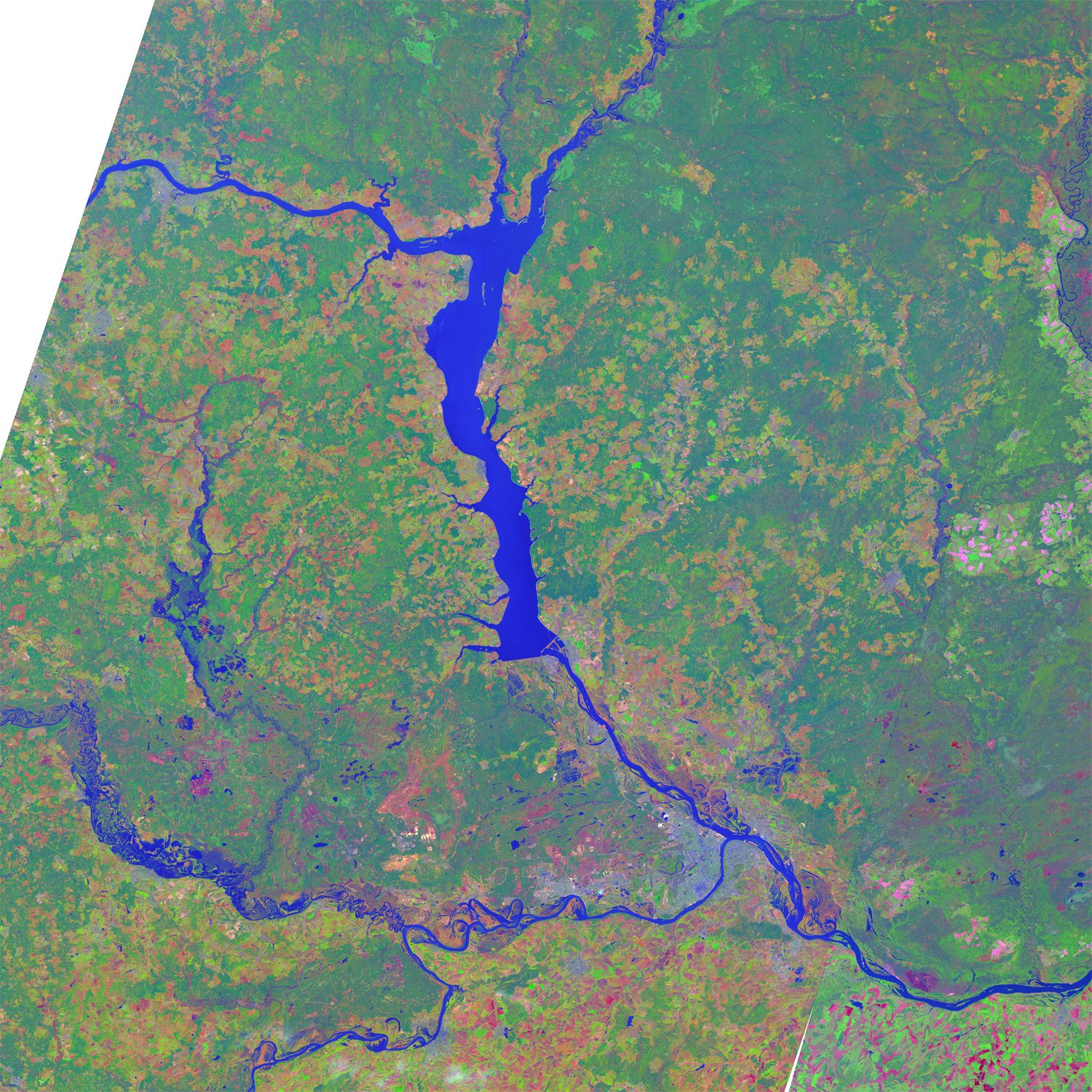
- Landsat image of Puchezh-Katunki crater

- Location within Russia Location within Nizhny Novgorod Oblast
- Location: Nizhny Novgorod Oblast, Russia; 56°58′N 43°43′E

Impact crater structure
- Confidence: Confirmed
- Diameter: 40 km (25 mi) (rim-to-rim); 80 km (50 mi) (including ring terrace)
- Age: 195.9 ± 1.0 Ma; Sinemurian, Early Jurassic
- Exposed: No
- Drilled: Yes

Puchezh-Katunki is a meteor crater located in the Nizhny Novgorod Oblast of the Volga Federal District, Russia. It is 80 km (50 mi) in diameter. Argon–argon dating has constrained the age of formation to be 195.9 ± 1.0 million years old, placing it within the Sinemurian stage of the Early Jurassic. The crater is not exposed to the surface, but appears as variation in the vegetation. The Earth Impact Database lists a rim-to-rim diameter of 40 kilometres (25 mi).

== Description ==
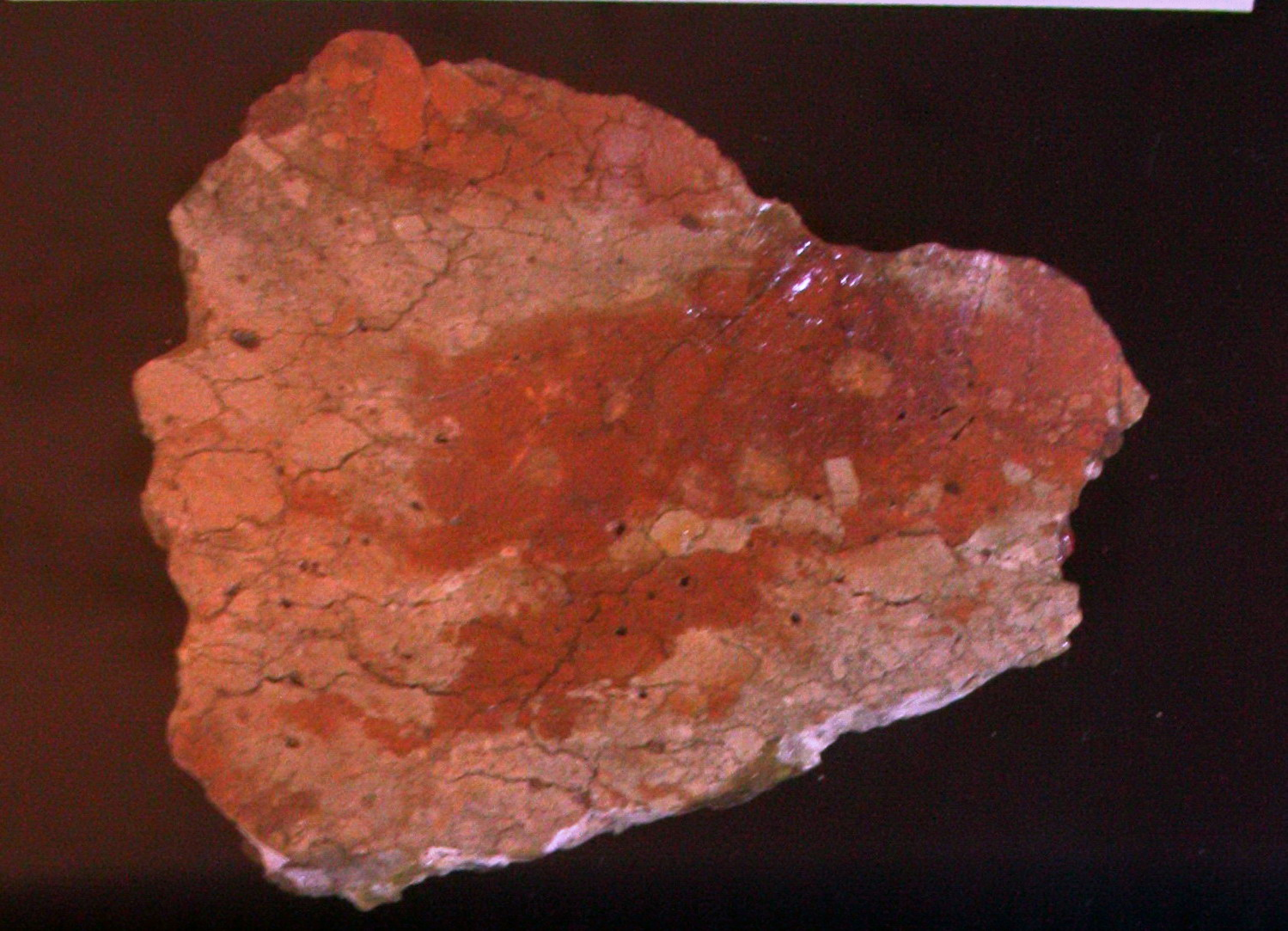
Shock stationed clay mineral (Speel) Puchezh-Katunsky meteorite crater in the Moscow museum of astronautics.

The central dome, ring depression, and ring terrace of the 80 km (50 mi) wide impact structure are nearly completely buried under Neogene and Quaternary sediments, with the only exposed impactites found on the banks of the Volga River.

== See also ==
- Obolon' crater
