= Sobolev crater =

Meteorite crater in eastern Russia

Coordinates: 46°18′N 137°52′E

- Sobolevskiy, Sobolevskii
- Location: Far Eastern Federal District, Russia

Impact crater structure
- Confidence: Confirmed
- Diameter: 53 metres (174 ft)
- Age: < 0.001 Ma
- Exposed: Yes
- Drilled: Yes

Sobolev (or Sobolevskiy, Sobolevskii) Crater is a meteorite crater in the Far Eastern Federal District of Russia.

It is 53 metres (174 ft) in diameter and is estimated to be less than 1000 years old. The crater is exposed at the surface. Most related publications are in Russian, and have not been translated to English as of 2014, but an English language report of fieldwork at the site can be found in Khryanina, 1981.
