= Gusev crater (Russia) =

Impact crater in Rostov Oblast, Russia

Coordinates: 48°26′N 40°32′E

- Location: Kamensk-Shakhtinsky, Rostov Oblast, Russia

Impact crater structure
- Confidence: Confirmed
- Diameter: 3 kilometres (1.9 mi)
- Age: 49.0 ± 0.2 Ma
- Exposed: No
- Drilled: Yes

Gusev is an impact crater in Russia. It is located near Kamensk-Shakhtinsky in Rostov Oblast.

The crater is 3 kilometres (1.9 mi) in diameter and its age is estimated to be 49.0 ± 0.2 million years old placing it in the Eocene. The crater is not exposed at the surface. It may have formed at the same time as the larger and nearby Kamensk crater.
