= Chukcha crater =

Impact crater on Taimyr Peninsula, Russia

Coordinates: 75°42′N 97°45′E

- Location: Taimyr Peninsula, Siberian Federal District, Russia

Impact crater structure
- Confidence: Confirmed
- Diameter: 6 kilometres (3.7 mi)
- Age: < 70 Ma
- Exposed: Yes
- Drilled: Yes

Chukcha is an impact crater in Taimyr Peninsula, Russia.

It is 6 kilometres (3.7 mi) in diameter and the age is estimated to be less than 70 million years old (Cretaceous or younger). The crater is exposed to the surface.
