= Jinlin Crater =

Terrestrial crater field

- Location within Asia
- Location: Guangdong, China; 23°18′17″N 111°48′49″E

Impact crater structure
- Diameter: 900 m (3,000 ft)
- Age: Holocene

Jinlin Crater is a recent impact crater in Deqing County, Guangdong Province, southern China, about 90 metres (300 ft) deep and with a diameter varying between about 820–900 metres (2,690–2,950 ft) across. The crater is tilted, the impact having occurred on a hillside slope, so it is slightly elliptical; its upper rim is about 200 metres (660 ft) higher than its lower. The meteorite that created the Jinlin Crater is estimated to have been 30 metres (98 ft) in diameter.

The impact is tentatively dated to have occurred during the current Holocene geological epoch, or less than 11,700 years ago. If this dating is correct, the Jinlin Crater is by far the largest known Holocene impact crater. A 2025 study analyzed evidence of shock metamorphism in the crater to confirm that it was created by an impact event. The age estimate reported in the initial study was based solely on an analysis of the weathering of the crater rocks. Such weathering analysis is subject to relatively large error, making this age estimate imprecise. Further analysis, such as radiometric argon-argon dating, could help date the impact more precisely.

Jinlin Crater was discovered (recognized as an impact crater) in 2025. That it has been preserved for thousands of years is somewhat unexpected, as the region it's in has a climate featuring heavy rain and high humidity, which generally cause rapid erosion of such features.

== See also ==
- List of impact craters on Earth
