= Kara crater =

Meteorite crater in northern Russia

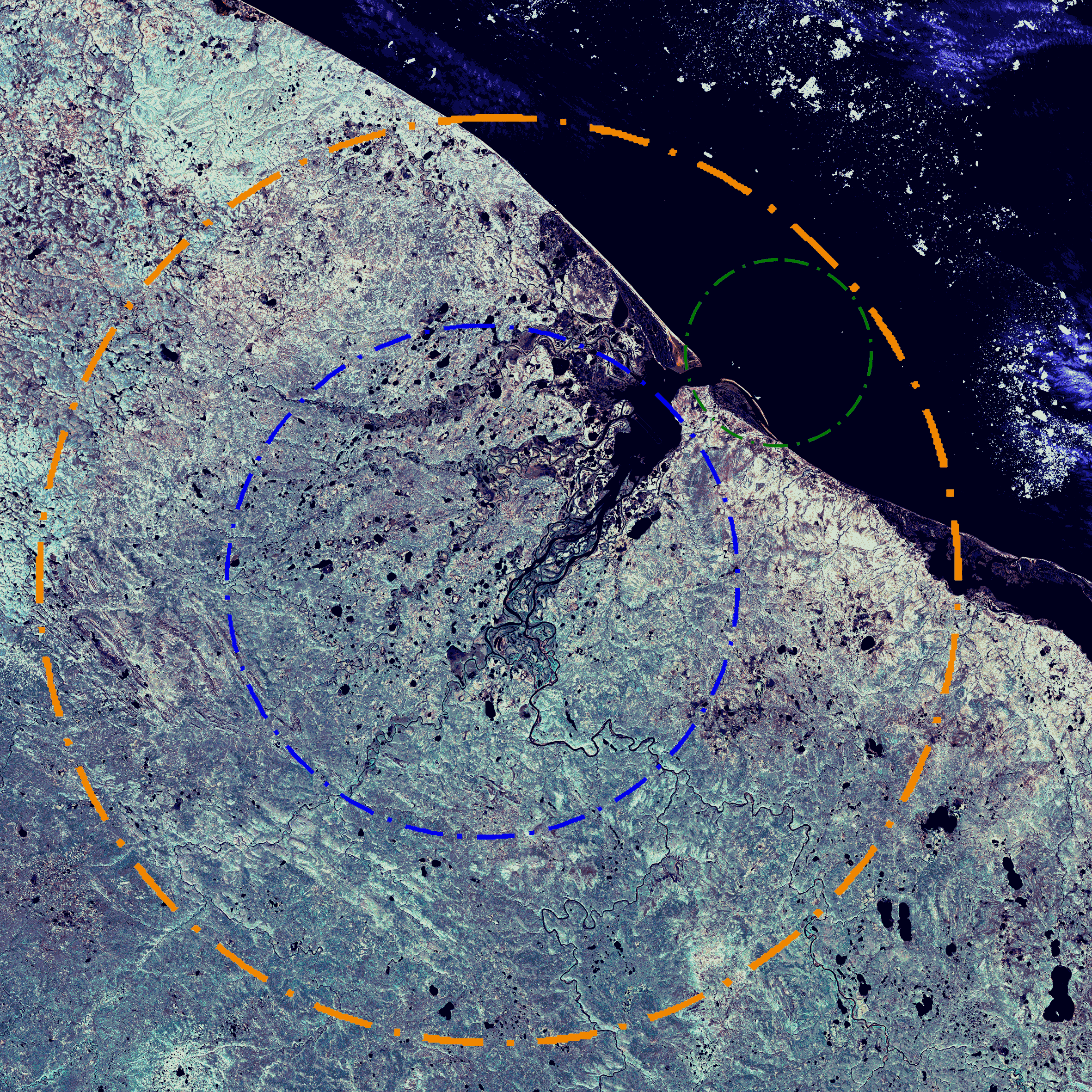
- Kara crater

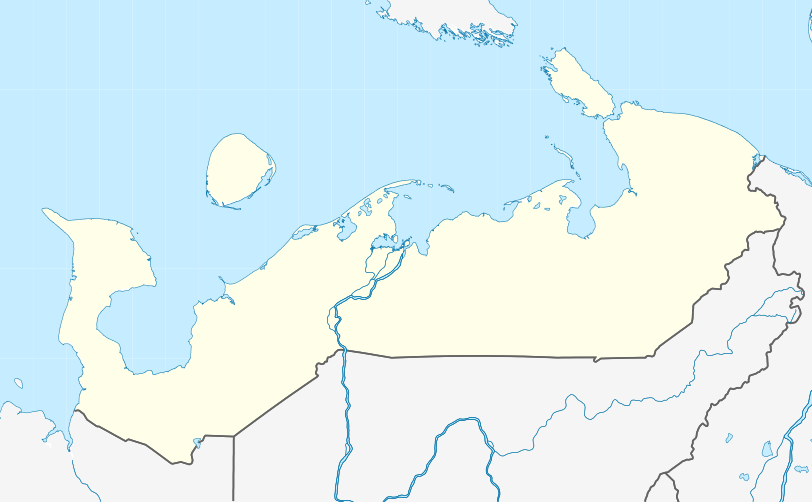
- Location within Nenets Autonomous Okrug Location within European Russia
- Location: Timan-Pechora Basin, Nenetsia, Russia; 69°6′0″N 64°9′0″E

Impact crater structure
- Confidence: Confirmed
- Diameter: 65 km (40 mi)
- Age: 70.3 ± 2.2; Late Cretaceous
- Exposed: No
- Drilled: Yes
- Bolide type: Chondrite

Kara is a meteorite crater in the Yugorsky Peninsula, Nenetsia, Russia.

Heavily eroded, it is presently 65 kilometres (40 mi) in diameter, though it is thought to be originally 120 kilometres (75 mi) before erosion. Its age is estimated to be 70.3 ± 2.2 million years old (Late Cretaceous). Impactite outcrops located on the Baydarata Gulf (Baydaratskaya) shore north-east of the crater imply that the original size of the crater could have been the 4th largest on Earth. The crater is not exposed at the surface.

The Kara crater lies in the southeastern end of the Yugorsky Peninsula, while the Ust-Kara site lies offshore, 15 kilometres (9.3 mi) east of the small Kara or Karskaya Guba inlet. It was formerly believed that these two sites were two separate craters and that they formed a twin impact structure from the Late Cretaceous. However, it seems that the Ust-Kara site does not exist as a separate site. Apparently, the suevite outcrops of the Ust-Kara impact structure are only a part of the Kara impact structure.
