= Kamensk crater =

Eocene impact crater in western Russia

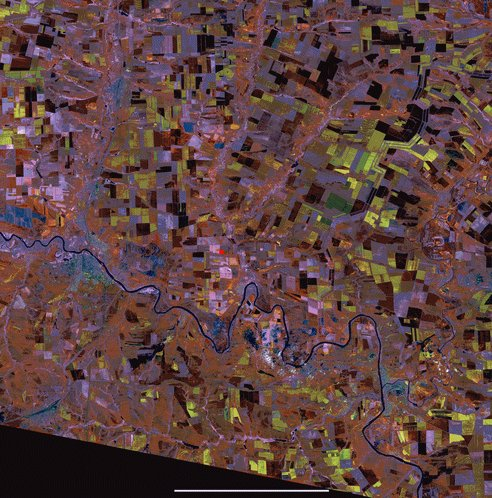
- Landsat image of Kamensk crater

- Location within Russia
- Location: Kamensk-Shakhtinsky, Rostov, Russia; 48°21′N 40°30′E

Impact crater structure
- Confidence: Confirmed
- Diameter: 25 km (16 mi)
- Age: 49.0 ± 0.2 Ma; Eocene
- Exposed: No
- Drilled: Yes

Kamensk crater is an impact crater located 10 to 15 kilometres (6.2 to 9.3 mi) to the north of Kamensk-Shakhtinsky town in Rostov Oblast, Russia. It is 25 km (16 mi) in diameter and the age is estimated to be 49.0 ± 0.2 million years old (Eocene). The crater is not exposed at the surface. It may have formed at the same time as the smaller and nearby Gusev crater.

== Description ==
Six laser total-fusion analyses of the Kamensk impact glass have a weighted-mean age of 49.2 ± 0.1 Ma relative to sanidine from the Taylor Creek Rhyolite of New Mexico, that has an age of 27.92 Ma relative to a K–Ar age of 162.9 ± 0 Ma for a primary fluence-monitor standard SB-3 biotite or of 513.9 Ma for an international hornblende standard MMhb-1. This isotopic age of the Kamensk glass recalculated using a reference age for MMhb-1 of 520.4 Ma is 49.9 ± 0.1 Ma.
