= Tabun-Khara-Obo crater =

Impact crater in south-east Mongolia

- Location within Mongolia
- Location: Dornogovi Province, Mongolia; 44°8′N 109°39′E

Impact crater structure
- Confidence: Confirmed
- Diameter: 1.3 km (0.81 mi)
- Rise: 20 to 30 m (66 to 98 ft)
- Age: 150 ± 20 Ma; Middle Jurassic to Early Cretaceous
- Exposed: Yes
- Drilled: Yes

Tabun-Khara-Obo is an impact crater in the Dornogovi Aimag (province) the south-east of Mongolia. The crater, which is exposed at the surface, is 1.3 km (0.81 mi) in diameter. The crater's rim rises some 20 to 30 metres (66 to 98 ft) above the crater bottom, but the bottom of crater is covered with up to 171 metres (561 ft) thick layer of lake deposits - a testimony that this crater in earlier times was filled with a lake.

It has an estimated age of 150 ± 20 million years (Middle Jurassic to Early Cretaceous). The site was first identified as a probable impact crater in the 1960s, although confirmation of the hypothesis only occurred decades later. Drilling at the site in 2008 revealed rock features consistent with high-speed impacts such as those caused by meteorites.

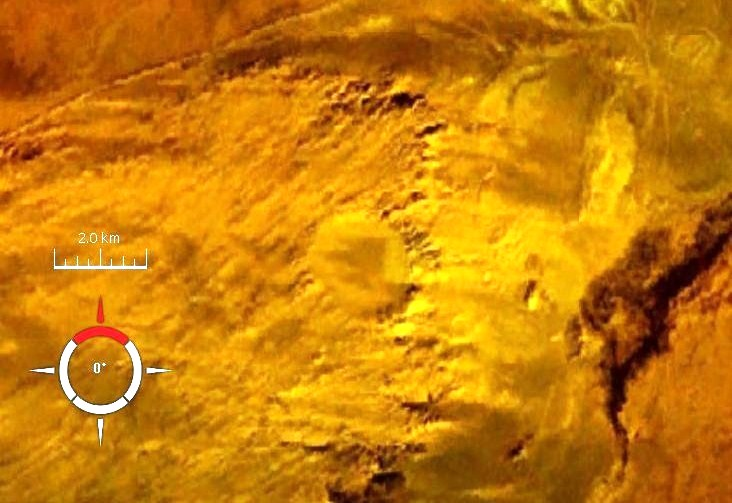
Landsat image of the Tabun-Khara-Obo crater; screen capture from NASA World Wind.

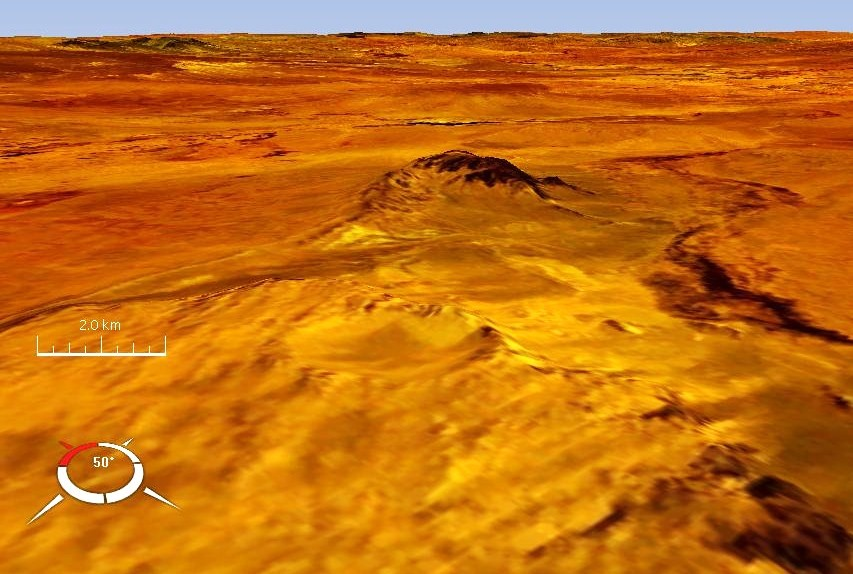
Oblique Landsat image of Tabun-Khara-Obo crater draped over digital elevation model (x5 vertical exaggeration); screen capture from NASA World Wind.

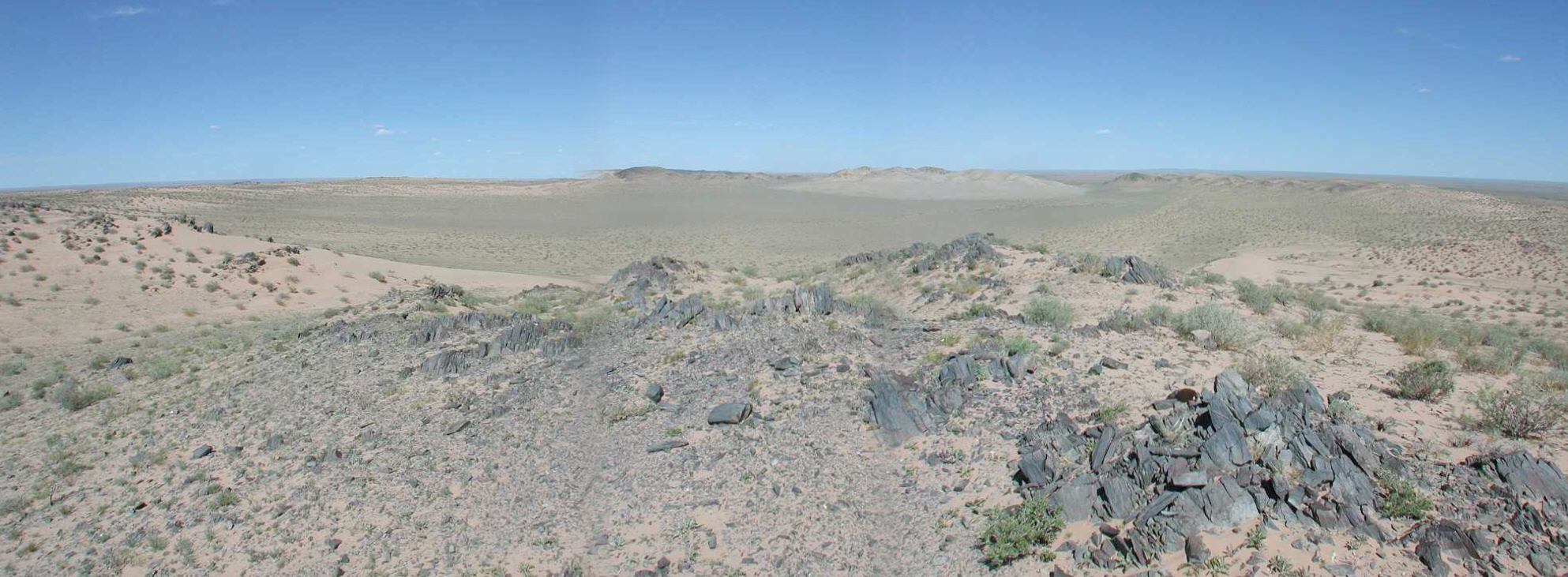
View to north across the Tabun-Khara-Obo crater.

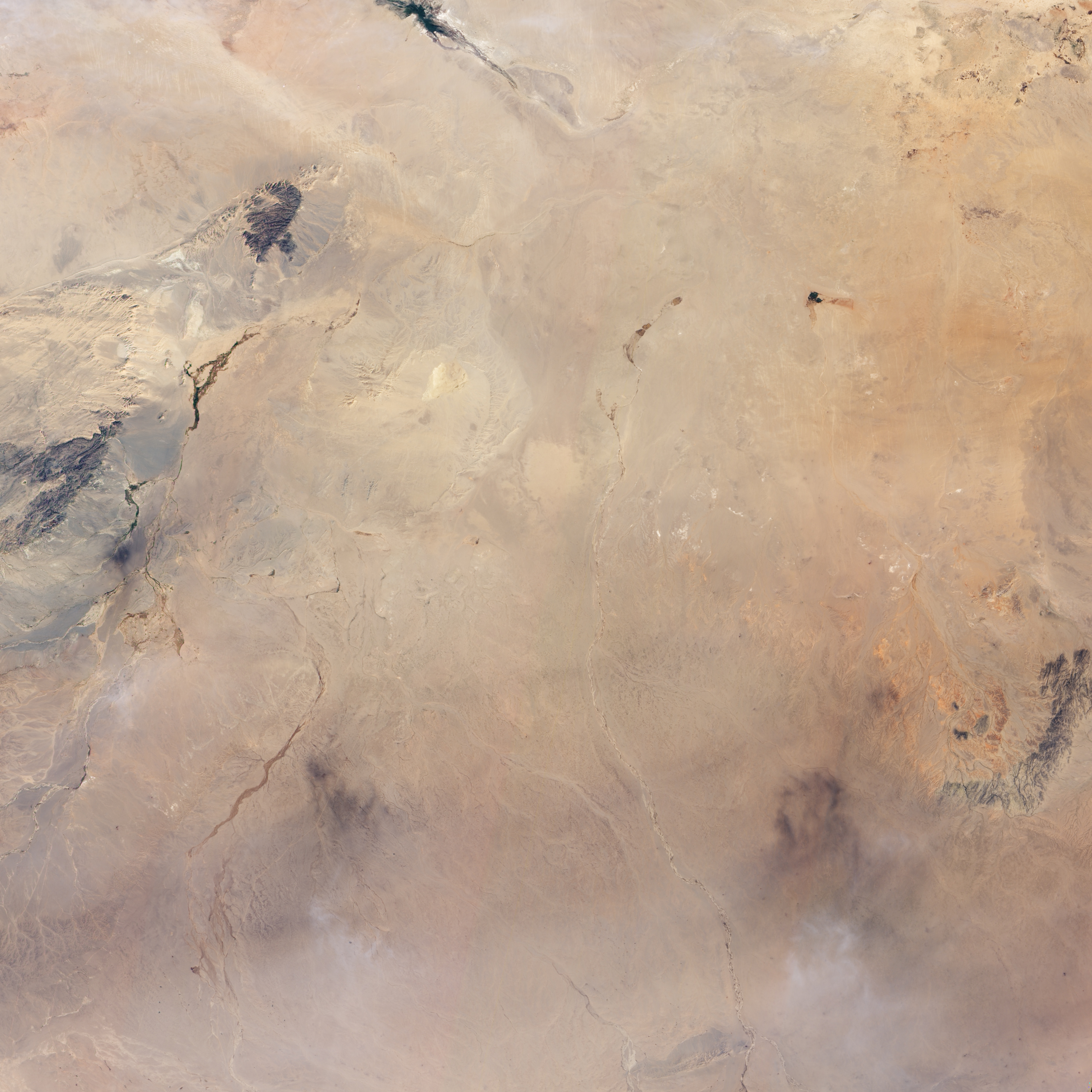
Satellite image of the crater and surrounding area.
