= Wabar craters =

Impact craters in Saudi Arabia

- Location within Saudi Arabia
- Location: Saudi Arabia; 21°30′09″N 50°28′27″E

Impact crater structure
- Confidence: Confirmed
- Diameter: 64 to 116 m (210 to 381 ft)
- Age: under 250 yrs
- Bolide type: Iron meteorite

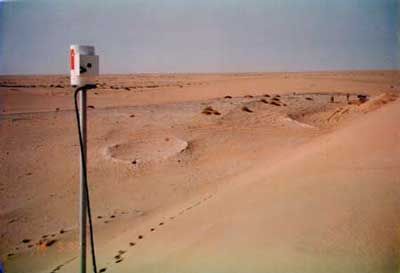
Smaller of the Wabar craters visible on the surface. The crater on the left is about 11 m in diameter.

The Wabar craters are impact craters located in Saudi Arabia first brought to the attention of Western scholars by British Arabist, explorer, writer and Colonial Office intelligence officer St John Philby, who discovered them while searching for the legendary city of Ubar in Arabia's Rub' al Khali ("Empty Quarter") in 1932.

== The expeditions ==
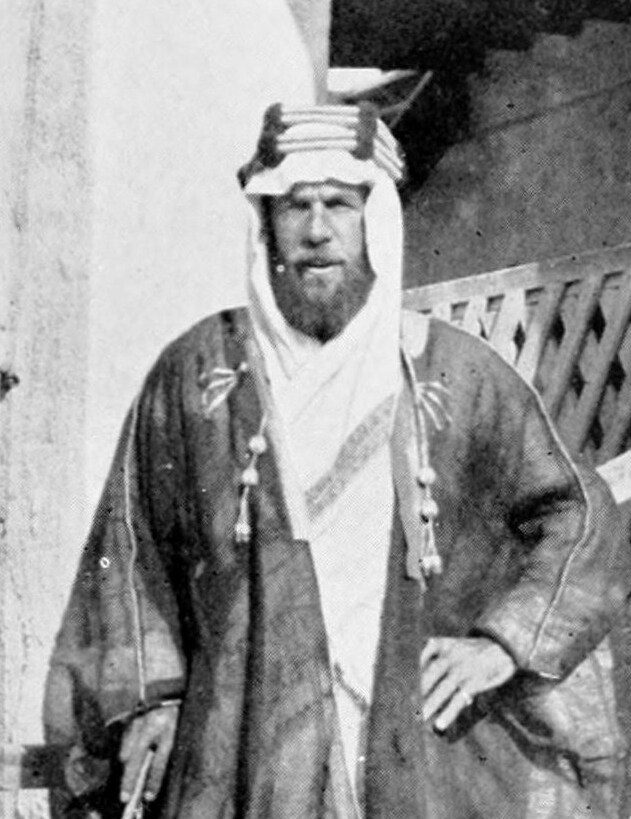
St John Philby in Riyadh

=== 1932 Philby ===
The vast desert wasteland of southern Saudi Arabia known as the Empty Quarter, or Rub' al Khali in Arabic, is one of the most desolate places on Earth. In 1932, Harry St John "Jack" Philby was hunting for a city named Ubar, that the Quran describes as having been destroyed by God for defying the Prophet Hud. Philby transliterated the name of the city as Wabar.

Philby had heard of Bedouin legends of an area called Al Hadida ("place of iron" in Arabic) with ruins of ancient habitations, and also an area where a piece of iron the size of a camel had been found, and so organized an expedition to visit the site. After a month's journey through wastes so harsh that even some of the camels died, on 2 February 1932 Philby arrived at a patch of ground about one-half square kilometre (0.19 mi^{2}) in size, littered with chunks of white sandstone, black glass, and chunks of iron meteorite. Philby identified two large circular depressions partially filled with sand, and three other features that he identified as possible "submerged craters". He also mapped the area where the large iron block was reputed to have been found. Philby thought that the area was a volcano, and it was only after bringing back samples to the UK that the site was identified as that of a meteorite impact by Leonard James Spencer of the British Museum.

A volcano in the midst of the Rub' al Khali! And below me, as I stood on that hill-top transfixed, lay the twin craters, whose black walls stood up gauntly above the encroaching sand like the battlements and bastions of some great castle. These craters were respectively about 100 and 50 yards in diameter, sunken in the middle but half choked with sand, while inside and outside their walls lay what I took to be lava in great circles where it seemed to have flowed out from the fiery furnace. Further examination revealed the fact that there were three similar craters close by, though these were surmounted by hills of sand and recognizable only by reason of the fringe of blackened slag round their edges.

Amongst the samples of iron, cindery material, and silica glass that Philby brought back from the site was a 25-pound (11 kg) chunk of iron. Analysis showed it to be about 90% iron and 5% nickel, with the rest consisting of various elements, including copper, cobalt, and an unusually high concentration of iridium, at 6 ppm. This siderophile element implied that the Wabar site was a meteorite impact area.

=== 1937 Aramco ===
In 1937, Aramco geologists T. F. Harriss and Walton Hoag, Jr., also investigated the site, but, like Philby, were unable to locate the large block of iron.

=== 1966 National Geographic and Aramco ===
In 1966, reports came that the sands had shifted and the large iron block was again visible. National Geographic journalist Thomas J. Abercrombie visited the site and found the large meteorite: "rumor has become a reality; the biggest iron meteorite ever found in Arabia lay at our feet ... shaped roughly like a saucer, it measured about four feet in diameter and two feet thick at center. A little quick geometry puts its weight at almost two and a half tons."

Later in October 1966, a group headed by Aramco employee James Mandaville visited the site with heavy lifting equipment. They found two large uncovered meteorites. The largest, weighing 2,045 kilograms (4,508 lb), had a pitted, but roughly level, top surface about one metre (3 ft 3 in) in diameter with one end formed into a cone shape when the meteorite penetrated the atmosphere like a bullet; it was embedded in sand, which had drifted over the top. It was photographed in situ, then overturned by a bulldozer and lifted on board a trailer where it and another, smaller meteorite were taken to Dhahran.

=== 1982 Aramco ===
Mandaville visited the site twice after his 1966 visit. On his last visit, in 1982, he noted that the desert winds and resultant movement of the dune system were covering the site: "instead of two thirds of the crater rim (visible as before [in 1966, 16 years earlier]), less than a quarter of it showed."

=== 1994–1995 Zahid Tractors ===
In 1994 and 1995, a total of three expeditions were undertaken, sponsored by the Zahid Tractor Corporation. A United States Geological Survey scientist, Jeffrey C. Wynn, joined all three expeditions, and astronomer and geologist Gene Shoemaker joined at least one. These expeditions were made with modern off-road vehicles, but even with modern technology, the trips were difficult ones. Not only were conditions harsh, but the Wabar site was tricky to find, as it sits in the midst of an enormous dune field that has no fixed landmarks.

== The site ==
The Wabar site covers about 500 by 1,000 metres (1,600 by 3,300 ft), and the most recent mapping shows three prominent, roughly circular craters. Five were reported by Philby in 1932, the largest of which measured 116 metres (381 ft) and 64 metres (210 ft) wide. Another was described by the second Zahid expedition and is 11 metres (36 ft) wide: this may be one of the other three originally described by Philby. They are all underlain by a hemispherical rim of "insta-Rock," so called because it was created from local sand by the impact shock wave, and all three are nearly full of sand.

The surface of the area partly consisted of "Insta-Rock" or "impactite", a bleached-white, coarsely-laminar sandstone lookalike, and was littered with black glass slag and pellets. The impactite featured a form of shocked quartz known as "coesite", and is thus clearly the product of an impact event. The impact did not penetrate to bedrock, but was confined to local sand, making it particularly valuable as a research site.

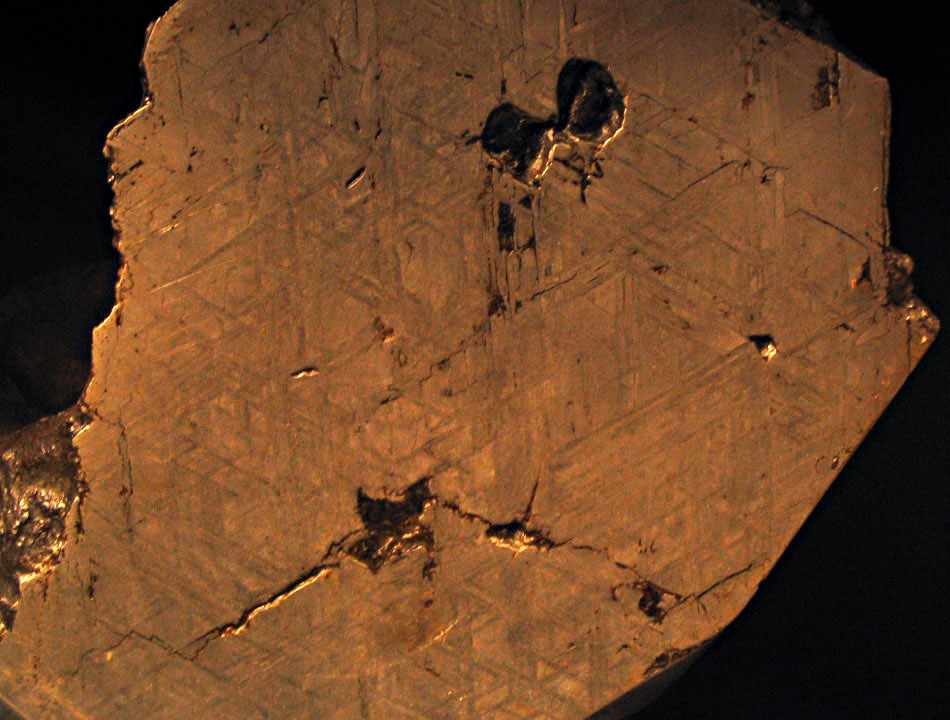
A Wabar meteorite: etched section showing the Widmanstätten pattern.

The presence of iron fragments at the site also pointed to a meteorite impact, as there are no iron deposits in the region. The iron was in the form of buried fist-sized cracked balls and smooth, sand-blasted fragments found on the surface. The largest fragment was recovered in a 1966 visit to Wabar and weighs 2.2 tonnes. It is known as the "Camel's Hump" and was on display at the King Saud University in Riyadh until it was moved to the new National Museum of Saudi Arabia in Riyadh, where it is displayed in the entrance foyer.

The sand was turned into black glass near the craters, and pellets of the glass are scattered all over the area, decreasing in size with distance from the craters due to wind-sorting. The glass is about 90% local sand and 10% meteoric iron and nickel.

The layout of the impact area suggests that the body fell at a shallow angle, and was moving at typical (although slightly slow) meteorite entry speeds of 11–17 km/s. Its total mass was more than 3,500 tonnes (which would give it a diameter of 16 meters at a density of 1.5 g/cm^{3}). The shallow angle presented the body with more air resistance than it would have encountered at a steeper angle, and it broke up in the air into at least four pieces before impact. The biggest piece struck with an explosion roughly equivalent to the atom bomb that leveled Hiroshima.

== Dating the impact event ==
Fission-track analysis of glass fragments by Storzer (1965) suggested the Wabar impact took place 6,400 ±2,500 years ago, but delicate glass filigree, and the fact that the craters have been filled in considerably since Philby's 1932 visit, suggests that their origin is much more recent. Thermoluminescence dating by Prescott et al. (2004) suggests the impact site is less than 250 years old. This is consistent with Arab reports of a fireball passing over Riyadh, variously reported as occurring in 1863 or 1891 and heading southeast, reported in Philby's book Empty Quarter (1933). Fragments scattered from the path of this fireball at the Umm al-Hadidah site 25 kilometres (16 mi) northwest of Wabar, which contained fragments of a Type IIIA octahedrite identical to Wabar fragments, support this northwestern direction of arrival. Moreover, mapping done in 1995 show that there is an asymmetric distribution of "Insta-Rock", the coarsely-laminar sandstone created by the impact shock-wave, in the down-range (southeast) direction of the three main craters mapped.

== See also ==
- Jabal Waqf es Suwwan crater
- Atlantis of the Sands
- List of impact craters on Earth
