= Mishina Gora crater =

Crater in Pskov Oblast, Russia

- Location within Russia Location within Pskov Oblast
- Location: Pskov Oblast, Northwestern Federal District, Russia; 58°43′N 28°3′E

Impact crater structure
- Confidence: Confirmed
- Diameter: 2.5 km (1.6 mi)
- Age: 300 ± 50 Ma; Carboniferous or Permian
- Exposed: Yes
- Drilled: Yes

Mishina Gora is an impact crater in European Russia, 180 kilometres southwest of St. Petersburg. It is located in Pskov Oblast of the Northwestern Federal District.

It is 2.5 kilometres (1.6 mi) in diameter and has been dated at 300 ± 50 Ma, dating to the beginning of the Permian Period. The crater is exposed at the surface, but is not easily distinguishable from overhead imagery.
