= Ragozinka crater =

Meteorite crater

Coordinates: 58°44′N 61°48′E

- Location: Urals, Russia

Impact crater structure
- Confidence: Confirmed
- Diameter: 9 kilometres (5.6 mi)
- Age: 46 ± 3 Ma
- Exposed: No
- Drilled: Yes

Ragozinka is a meteorite crater in the Urals in Russia.

It is 9 kilometres (5.6 mi) in diameter and the age is estimated to be 46 ± 3 million years old (Eocene). The crater is not exposed at the surface.
