= Kursk crater =

Impact crater in Kursk Oblast, Russia

- Location within Russia Location within Kursk Oblast
- Location: Kursk Oblast, Central Federal District, Russia; 51°42′N 36°0′E

Impact crater structure
- Confidence: Confirmed
- Diameter: 6 km (3.7 mi)
- Age: 250 ± 80 Ma; Carboniferous to Early Jurassic
- Exposed: No
- Drilled: Yes

Kursk is an impact crater located in Kursk Oblast of the Central Federal District, Russia.

It is 6 km (3.7 mi) in diameter and the age is estimated to be 250 ± 80 million years old (Carboniferous to Early Jurassic). The crater is not exposed to the surface.
