= Chiyli crater =

Impact crater in Kazakhstan

Coordinates: 49°10′30″N 57°50′6″E

Chiyli Crater
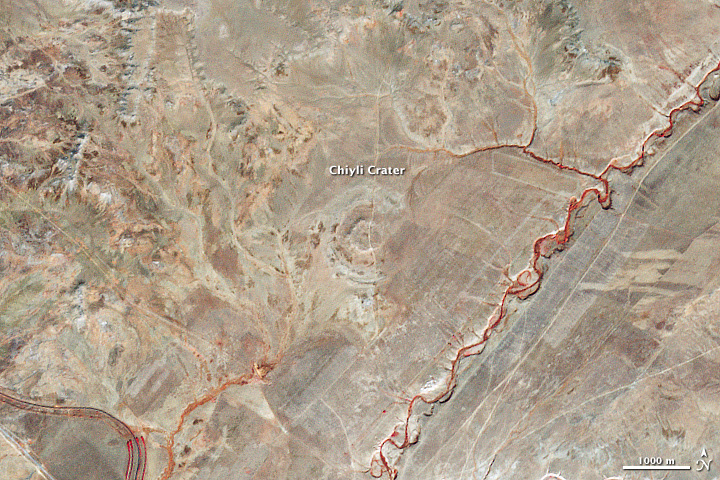
- Location: Aktobe, Kazakhstan

Impact crater structure
- Confidence: Confirmed
- Diameter: 5.5 kilometres (3.4 mi)
- Age: c. 46 million years
- Exposed: Yes
- Drilled: Yes

Chiyli Crater is an impact crater in Aktobe, Kazakhstan. It is 5.5 kilometres (3.4 mi) in diameter and the age is estimated to be 46 ± 7 million years. The crater is exposed at the surface.
