= Suavjärvi =

Lake and claimed impact structure in Karelia, northwest Russia

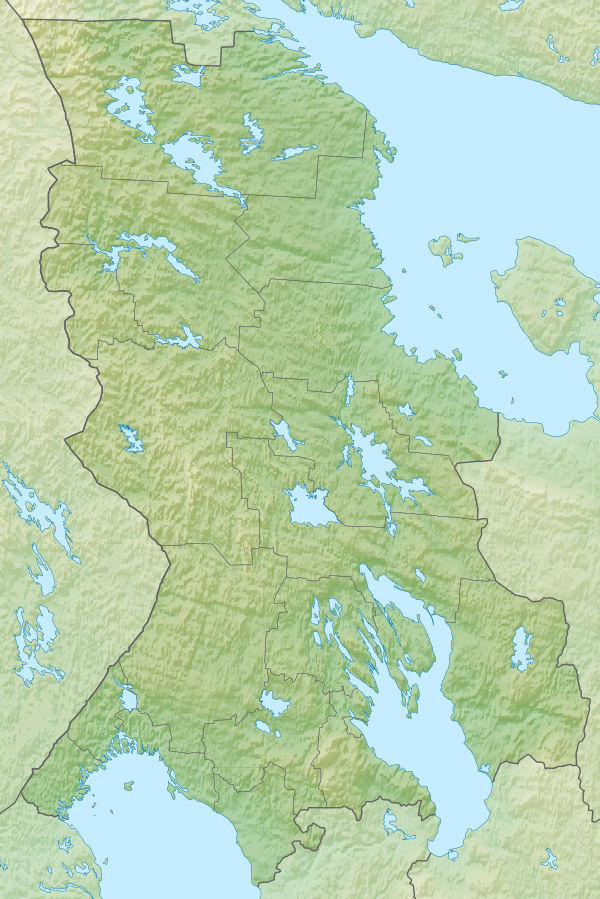
- Location within Karelia
- Location: Republic of Karelia
- Coordinates: 63°7′N 33°23′E
- Type: Glacial lake
- Basin countries: Russia
- Max. width: 3 km (1.9 mi)

Suavjärvi (in Karelian, Russian: Суавъярви) is a lake in the Republic of Karelia, Russia about 50 km north of the town of Medvezhyegorsk. The lake is approximately 3 kilometers (1.9 mi) wide.

Mashchak and Naumov argue that Suavjärvi lies at the center of a deeply eroded and highly metamorphosed impact structure, the Suavjärvi structure, which has a diameter of 16 kilometers (9.9 mi). According to Mashchak and Naumov, this impact structure is characterized by gravity and magnetic lows and in its northeastern and southwestern parts, impact-generated polymict megabreccias. The megabreccias are composed of blocks of both basement granitoids and supracrustal greenstone. Shock metamorphic features in are reported to be rare and to consist of planar features, deformation bands, and mosaic structure in quartz and deformation feature in feldspars and biotite. Younger regional metamorphism has significantly altered the rocks composing the structure and may have either obliterated or altered any shock metamorphic effects.

The inferred age of the Suavjarvi structure lies within an age interval between 2.7 and 2.2 billion years. Its older age limit of 2.7 billion years is set by the regional age of Late Lopian granitoids that occur as fragments within the megabreccias. The overlap of impact polymictic breccias by basal conglomerates of the Jatulian Group and presence of weathered breccia within its conglomerates indicates that the Suavjarvi structure predates it. The lower age limit of the Jatulian Group is tentatively regarded to be between 2.3 and 2.2 billion years.

However, Huber and others conducted field and laboratory investigations of the Suavjärvi structure. They found that the bedrock outcrops inside the structure, mapped as "polymict impact breccia" and classified as "megabreccia", consists of massive granite and schist that are indistinguishable in the field from Archean outcrops outside the structure. They also found an absence of evidence of shock metamorphism in samples from within the hypothesized impact structure and that the rocks associated with it do not substantially differ from the normal regional geology. This lake is more likely a glacial lake. The Suavjärvi structure's classification as an impact structure remains controversial and unsettled.
