= Beyenchime-Salaatin crater =

Impact crater in the Sakha Republic, Russia

Coordinates: 71°0′N 121°40′E

- Location: Russian Far East, Russia

Impact crater structure
- Confidence: Confirmed
- Diameter: 6 kilometres (3.7 mi)
- Age: 40 ± 20 Ma
- Exposed: Yes
- Drilled: No

Beyenchime-Salaatin is an impact crater (astrobleme) in the Russian Far East.

It is 8 kilometres (5.0 mi) in diameter and is estimated to be 40 ± 20 million years old (Eocene). The crater is exposed at the surface and is located in the Beyenchime river basin, south of the course of its left tributary, the Beyenchime Salaata (Бэйэнчимэ-Салаата).
