= Kaluga crater =

Impact crater in Russia

Coordinates: 54°30′N 36°12′E

- Location: Kaluga Oblast, Central Federal District, Russia

Impact crater structure
- Diameter: 15 kilometres (9.3 mi)
- Depth: 800 metres (2,600 ft)
- Age: 380 ± 5 Ma
- Exposed: No

Kaluga is an impact crater located in Kaluga Oblast of the Central Federal District, Russia.

It is 15 kilometres (9.3 mi) in diameter and the age is estimated to be 380 ± 5 million years old (Upper Devonian). The crater is buried under 800 metres (2,600 ft) of sediments; it is not exposed at the surface.
