= Yilan crater =

Impact crater in Heilongjiang, China

Yilan Crater
- Location within China
- Location: Heilongjiang, China; 46°23′03″N 129°18′50″E

Impact crater structure
- Diameter: 1.85 km (1.15 mi)
- Depth: 150 m (490 ft)
- Age: Late Pleistocene

Yilan crater is an impact crater in China, situated to the northwest of the town of Yilan in Heilongjiang province. Its southern rim has eroded, but its northern rim is visible on the surface as a crescent-shaped ridge. It has a diameter of 1.85 km (1.15 mi) at its maximum extent, with the rim rising 150 m (490 ft) above the crater's basin. Radiocarbon dating shows its age to be only 46,100 to 52,500 years.
