= Shunak crater =

Coordinates: 47°12′30″N 72°45′35″E

- Kazakh: Шұнақ метеорит кратері
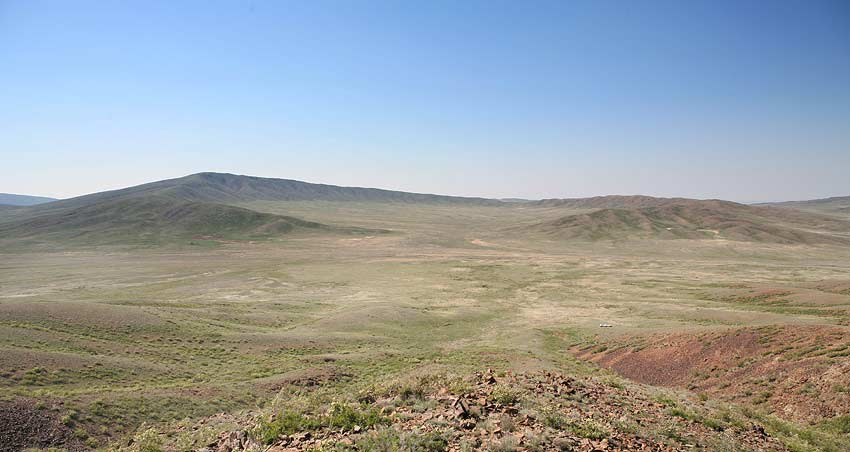
- Crater Shunak
- Location: Qaraghandy Province, Kazakhstan

Impact crater structure
- Diameter: 2.8 km (1.7 mi)
- Age: 35-55 Ma
- Exposed: Yes
- Drilled: Yes

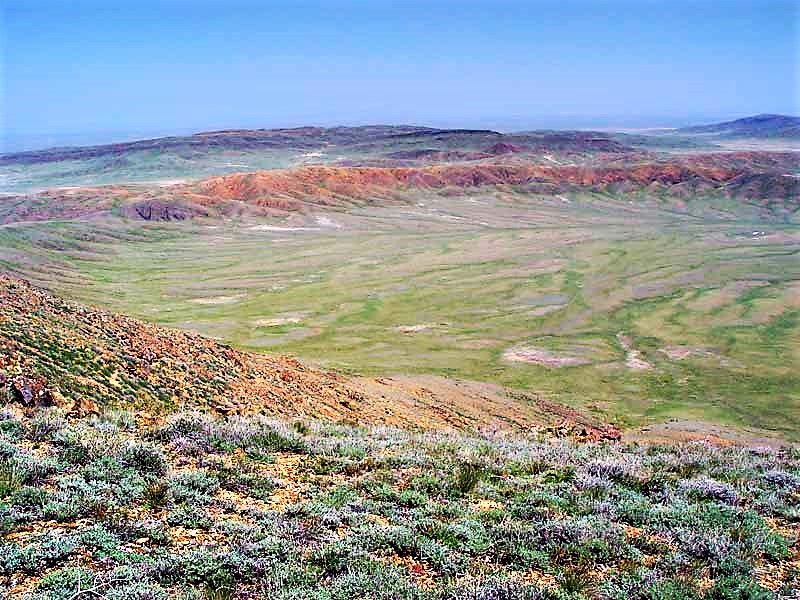
Crater Shunak

Shunak (Kazakh: Шұнақ метеорит кратері, Şūnaq meteorit kraterı) is a meteorite impact crater in the southeastern part of Qaraghandy Province in Kazakhstan.

It is 2.8 km (1.7 mi) in diameter and the age is estimated to be between 35 and 55 million years (Eocene). The crater is exposed at the surface.
