= Karla crater =

Meteorite impact crater in Tatarstan, Russia

Coordinates: 54°55′N 48°2′E

- Russian: Карлинский кратер; Tatar: Карлы кратеры, romanized: Qarlı kraterı
- Location: Tatarstan, Russia

Impact crater structure
- Confidence: Confirmed
- Diameter: 10 kilometres (6.2 mi)
- Age: 5 ± 1 Ma
- Exposed: Yes
- Drilled: Yes

Karla Crater (Russian: Карлинский кратер; Tatar: Карлы кратеры, romanized: Qarlı kraterı) is a meteorite impact crater in Tatarstan, Russia.

It is 10 km in diameter and the age is estimated to be 5 ± 1 million years old (probably Pliocene). The crater is exposed at the surface.
