= Bigach crater =

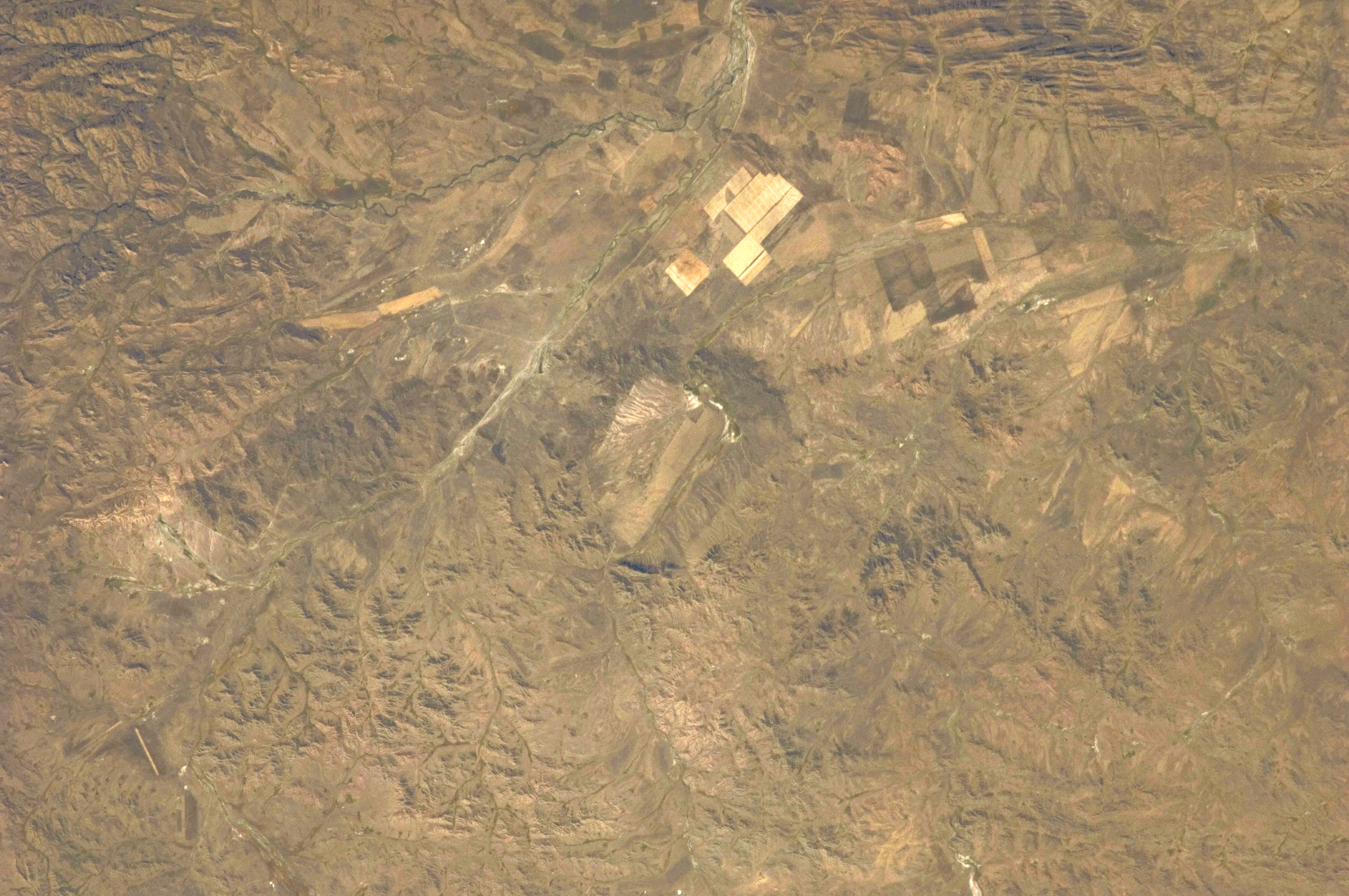
- Bigach impact crater (image centre)

- Location within Kazakhstan
- Location: Kazakhstan; 48°36′00″N 82°0′00″E

Impact crater structure
- Diameter: 8 kilometers (5.0 mi)
- Age: 5 ± 3 million years

Bigach (from Kazakh: қиғаш, Qiğaş – curved) is an impact crater in Kazakhstan.

It is 8 km in diameter and the age is estimated to be 5 ± 3 million years (Pliocene or Miocene). The crater is exposed at the surface.
