= Earth Impact Database =

Database of impact structures on Earth

World map in equirectangular projection of the impact structures on the Earth Impact Database as of November 2017 (in the SVG file, hover over a structure to show its details)

The Earth Impact Database is a database of confirmed impact structures or craters on Earth. It was initiated in 1955 by the Dominion Observatory, Ottawa, under the direction of Carlyle S. Beals. Since 2001, it has been maintained as a not-for-profit source of information at the Planetary and Space Science Centre at the University of New Brunswick, Canada.

As of November 2025, the database lists 190 confirmed impact sites. This number has not changed since 2019.

Other lists are wider in scope by including more than just confirmed sites, such as probable, possible, suspected and rejected or discredited impact sites on their lists. These are used for screening and tracking study of possible impact sites. Sites will appear first in these lists while under study and may be incorporated into UNB's Earth Impact Database after confirmation and collection of enough information about the site to satisfy the database's strict entry criteria.

A previous list was maintained by the Impact Field Studies Group at the University of Tennessee, Knoxville. The Catalogue of the Earth's Impact structures is maintained at the Siberian Center for Global Catastrophes.

== See also ==
- List of impact structures on Earth
- List of possible impact structures on Earth
