= Logancha crater =

Meteorite crater in Siberia, Russia

Logancha Crater
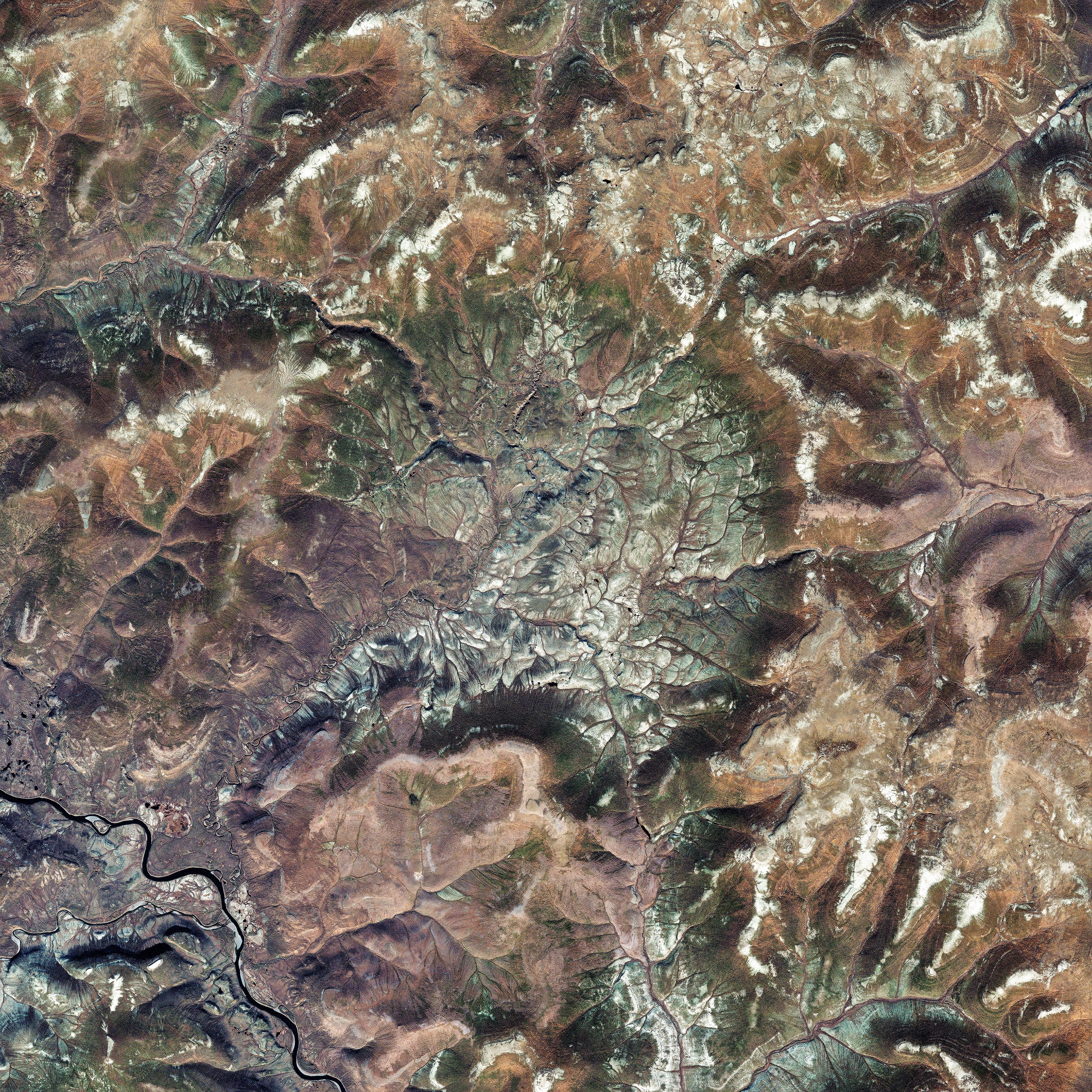

- Location within Krasnoyarsk Krai
- Location: Krasnoyarsk, Russia; 65°31′N 95°56′E

Impact crater structure
- Confidence: Confirmed
- Diameter: 20 km (12 mi)
- Age: ~40 million years
- Exposed: No
- Drilled: No

Logancha Crater is an impact crater in Krasnoyarsk, Russia. It is 20 km (12 mi) in diameter and the age is estimated to be 40 ± 20 million years old. The crater is not exposed at the surface.
