= List of impact structures in Europe =

World map in equirectangular projection of the impact structures on the Earth Impact Database as of November 2017 (in the SVG file, hover over a structure to show its details)

This list includes all 41 confirmed impact structures in Europe as listed in the Earth Impact Database (EID). These features were caused by the collision of large meteorites or comets with the Earth. For eroded or buried craters, the stated diameter typically refers to an estimate of original rim diameter, and may not correspond to present surface features. By EID convention, Russian and Asian craters are grouped together in the List of impact craters in Asia and Russia.

== Confirmed impact structures ==
Europe

Name	Location	Diameter (km)	Age (years)	Coordinates
Boltysh	Ukraine	24	65.39+0.14 −0.16 million	48°45′N 32°10′E
Dellen	Sweden	19	89.0 ± 2.7 million	61°51′N 16°42′E
Dobele	Latvia	4.5	290 ± 35 million	56°35′N 23°15′E
Gardnos	Norway	5	500 ± 10 million	60°39′N 9°0′E
Granby	Sweden	3	470 million (approx.)	58°25′N 14°56′E
Ilumetsa	Estonia	0.08	6600 (at least)	57°58′N 27°25′E
Hummeln structure	Sweden	1.2	443-470 million (approx.)	57°22′N 16°15′E
Ilyinets	Ukraine	8.5	378 ± 5 million	49°7′N 29°6′E
Iso-Naakkima	Finland	3	1000 million (at least)	62°11′N 27°9′E
Kaali	Estonia	0.11 km (largest of 9)	3000-5000	58°22′N 22°40′E
Kärdla	Estonia	4	455 million (approx.)	59°1′N 22°46′E
Karikkoselkä	Finland	1.4	230 million (approx.)	62°13′N 25°15′E
Keurusselkä	Finland	30	1800 million (at most)	62°8′N 24°36′E
Lappajärvi	Finland	23	77.85 ± 0.78 million	63°12′N 23°42′E
Lockne	Sweden	7.5	458 million (approx.)	63°0′N 14°49′E
Logoisk	Belarus	15	42.3 ± 1.1 million	54°12′N 27°48′E
Lumparn	Finland	9	1000 million (approx.)	60°9′N 20°6′E
Målingen	Sweden	1	458 million (approx.)	62°55′N 14°33′E
Mien	Sweden	9	121.0 ± 2.3 million	56°25′N 14°52′E
Mizarai	Lithuania	5	500 ± 20 million	54°1′N 23°54′E
Mjølnir	Barents Sea, Norway	40	142.0 ± 2.6 million	73°48′N 29°40′E
Morasko	Poland	0.10 km (largest of 7)	10000	52°29′N 16°54′E
Neugrund	Estonia	8	470 million (approx.)	59°20′N 23°40′E
Nördlinger Ries	Germany	25	14.8 million	48°53′N 10°34′E
Obolon'	Ukraine	20	169 ± 7 million	49°35′N 32°55′E
Paasselkä	Finland	10	1800 million (at most)	62°9′N 29°25′E
Ritland crater	Norway	2.7	520 ± 20 million	59°14′N 6°26′E
Rochechouart	France	23	206.92 ± 0.32 million	45°49′N 0°47′E
Rotmistrovka	Ukraine	2.7	120 ± 10 million	49°0′N 32°0′E
Saarijärvi	Finland	1.5	600 million (at least)	65°17′N 28°23′E
Siljan	Sweden	52	376.8 ± 1.7 million	61°2′N 14°52′E
Steinheim	Germany	3.8	15 ± 1 million	48°41′N 10°4′E
Suvasvesi North	Finland	4	1000 million (at most)	62°42′N 28°10′E
Suvasvesi South	Finland	3.8	250 million (approx.)	62°36′N 28°13′E
Sääksjärvi	Finland	6	560 million (approx.)	61°24′N 22°24′E
Söderfjärden	Finland	6.6	600 million (approx.)	63°0′N 21°34′E
Ternovka	Ukraine	11	280 ± 10 million	48°08′N 33°31′E
Tvären	Sweden	2	455 million (approx.)	58°46′N 17°25′E
Vepriai	Lithuania	8	160 ± 10 million (at least)	55°5′N 24°35′E
Zapadnaya	Ukraine	3.2	165 ± 5 million	49°44′N 29°0′E
Zeleny Gai	Ukraine	3.5	80 ± 20 million	48°4′N 32°45′E

== Unconfirmed impact structures ==
The following structures are officially considered "unconfirmed" because they are not listed in the Earth Impact Database. Due to stringent requirements regarding evidence and peer-reviewed publication, newly discovered craters or those for which it is difficult to collect evidence are generally known for some time before becoming listed. However, entries on the unconfirmed list could still have an impact origin disproven.

Name	Location	Diameter	Age	Coordinates
Guarda	Portugal	30	200 million (approx.)	40°38′N 07°06′W
Silverpit	North Sea near England	20	60 ± 15 million	54°14′N 1°51′E
Sirente	Italy	largest 140 x 115 m	1700 (approx.)	42°10′38″N 13°35′45″E
Ullapool	Loch Broom, Scotland	50	1.2 billion	57.891°N 5.165°W
Zerelia East	Thessaly, Greece	150 m	7000 (at least)	39°09′43″N 22°42′51″E
Zerelia West	Thessaly, Greece	250 m	7000 (at least)	39°09′48″N 22°42′32″E

== See also ==
- Bolide
- Impact crater
- Impact event
- Traces of Catastrophe – book from Lunar and Planetary Institute - comprehensive reference on impact crater science
