= Impact structures of Sweden =

In early 2018 there were eight known impact structures in Sweden. They range in age from 90 mya to 470 mya, and in diameter from 1 km to 52 km. Six of them are exposed, that is they are visible at the surface, in the natural landscape, although their nature and origin might need to be pointed out to the untrained layman.

== List ==
- Dellen
- Granby crater
- Hummeln structure
- Lockne crater
- Målingen Crater
- Mien (lake)
- Siljan Ring
- Tvären

== See also ==
- Ordovician meteor event
