= Impact crater lake =

Lake formed within an impact crater

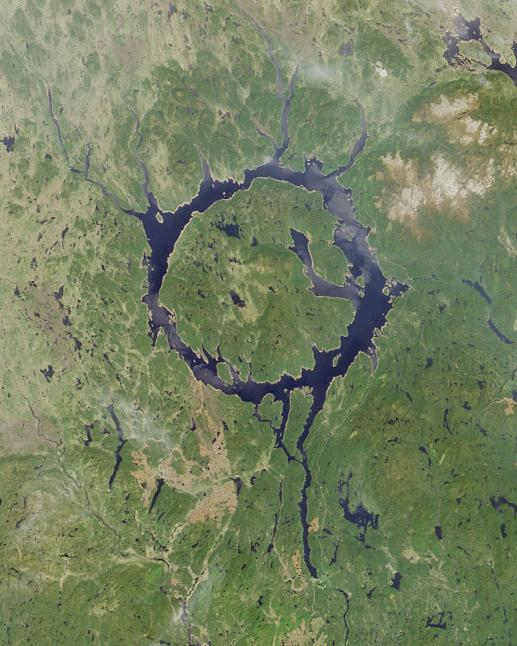
Lake Manicouagan in Quebec, Canada

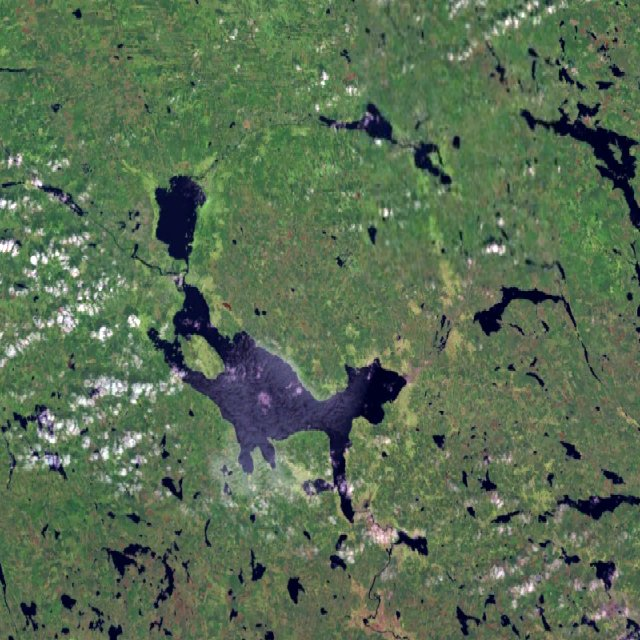
A satellite photograph of the Siljan Ring. Lake Siljan is a large part of the southwest edge of the much-eroded crater.

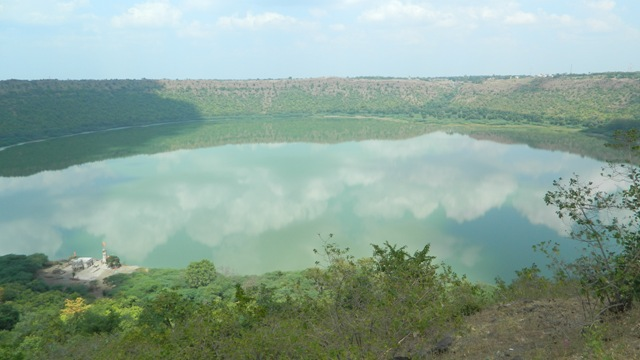
Lonar Lake in India

An impact crater lake is a lake inside a depression caused by the impact of a meteor. It is also known as an annular lake in cases where the water body is shaped like a ring, as many impact crater lakes are.

== Examples ==
One of the largest impact crater lakes is Lake Manicouagan in Canada; the crater is a multiple-ring structure about 100 km (60 mi) across, with its 70 km (40 mi) diameter inner ring its most prominent feature; it contains a 70 km (40 mi) diameter annular lake, surrounding an inner island plateau, René-Levasseur Island. It is Earth's sixth-largest confirmed impact crater according to rim-to-rim diameter.

== List ==
| Lake | Location |
Africa
| Lake Bosomtwe | Ghana |
| Tswaing crater | South Africa |
Asia
| Karakul | Tajikistan |
| Lake Cheko (possibly created in 1908 with the Tunguska event) | Siberia, Russia |
| Lake El'gygytgyn | Chukotka, Russia |
| Lonar Lake | India |
Europe
| Dellen | Sweden |
| Karikkoselkä | Finland |
| Keurusselkä | Finland |
| Lake Kaali | Estonia |
| Lake Lappajärvi | Finland |
| Lake Siljan | Sweden |
| Lake Yanisyarvi | Karelia, Russia |
| Mien | Sweden |
| Morasko meteorite nature reserve (five of the seven craters contain lakes) | Poland |
| Paasselkä | Finland |
| Sääksjärvi | Finland |
| Saarijärvi crater | Finland |
| Suvasvesi | Finland |
North America
| Clearwater Lakes (lake-filling paired impact craters: Lac à l'Eau Claire Est, Lac à l'Eau Claire Ouest) | Quebec, Canada |
| Couture crater | Quebec, Canada |
| Gilmour and Tecumseh Lakes, Brent crater | Ontario, Canada |
| Gow crater | Saskatchewan, Canada |
| Lake Manicouagan (artificially enlarged by a dam) | Quebec, Canada |
| Lake Wanapitei | Ontario, Canada |
| Mistastin crater | Labrador, Canada |
| Pilot crater | Northwest Territories, Canada |
| Pingualuit crater (formerly called Chubb Crater and later New Quebec Crater) | Quebec, Canada |
| West Hawk Lake | Manitoba, Canada |
Oceania
| Acraman crater (ephemeral playa lake) | South Australia, Australia |
| Shoemaker crater | Western Australia, Australia |

== See also ==
- Volcanic crater lake
