= Kuorinka =

Lake of Liperi, Finland

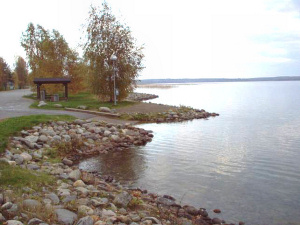

- Location within Finland
- Location: Liperi
- Coordinates: 62.59°N 29.35°E
- Primary inflows: Kuoringanpuro
- Primary outflows: Orivesi
- Catchment area: Vuoksi
- Basin countries: Finland
- Surface area: 12.916 km^{2} (4.987 sq mi)
- Average depth: 10.52 m (34.5 ft)
- Max. depth: 31.6 m (104 ft)
- Water volume: 0.136 km^{3} (110,000 acre⋅ft)
- Shore length^{1}: 22.03 km (13.69 mi)
- Surface elevation: 87.3 m (286 ft)
- Frozen: December–April
- Islands: Suurisaari
- ^{1} Shore length is not a well-defined measure.

Kuorinka is a medium-sized lake in the Vuoksi main catchment area. It is located in the region of Northern Karelia in Finland.

Whole lake and the shores (13 km^{2}) are protected in Natura 2000 conservation program (code FI0700089) due to lakes oligotrophic waters containing very few minerals of sandy plains.

== See also ==
- List of lakes in Finland
