= Impact structures in Finland =

As of June 2018, 12 confirmed impact structures have been found in Finland. They are listed below, sorted by original diameter.

List of identified impact structures in Finland
Structure name	Crater type	Diameter (km)		Depth (m)			Age (Myr)			Geologic period (epoch)	Location	Municipality	Impact origin shown [Note 3]	Notes
Structure name	Crater type	Original (estimate) [Note 1]	Current	Original (estimate) [Note 1]	Current (buried structure)	Current (solid surface) [Note 2]	Min	Max	Best fit	Geologic period (epoch)	Location	Municipality	Impact origin shown [Note 3]	Notes
Keurusselkä	Complex	30	14	820		N/A	1141	1161	1150	Stenian	62.1302°N 24.6327°E	Keuruu / Mänttä-Vilppula	2004 2010	Heavily eroded, only remnants of central peak remain.
Lappajärvi	Complex	20	17	730		137	77.07	78.63	77.85	Cretaceous (Late)	63.1444°N 23.6508°E	Lappajärvi / Alajärvi / Vimpeli	1968 1970 1976	Preserved well, rim outside lake largely intact.
Paasselkä	Complex?		10	590		74	229.2	232.8	231.0	Triassic (Late)	62.1549°N 29.4008°E	Savonlinna / Kitee	1999 2003 2008	Bay of Orivesi lake in Greater Saimaa.
Lumparn	Complex	9	9 - 10	570			450	1250	580	Ectasian to Ordovician	60.1429°N 20.1215°E	Jomala / Lemland / Lumparland / Sund	1993 1997	Bay of the Archipelago sea.
Söderfjärden	Complex, polygonal (hexagonal)	6.6	6.6	520		55	520 - 640			Cambrian (Early)	63.0039°N 21.5579°E	Vaasa / Korsholm / Malax	1978 1985 2013	Extremely well preserved; rim nearly entirely intact, buried soon after impact, later exhumed. Dried bay of Kvarken.
Sääksjärvi	Simple?	5	4.5 - 5	480		9.1	544	576	560	Ediacaran	61.4066°N 22.3792°E	Kokemäki	1969 1980 1997	Central part of the Sääksjärvi lake.
Suvasvesi N	Complex?		4	450			79.7	88.1	85	Cretaceous (Late)	62.6530°N 28.1786°E	Kuopio / Leppävirta	1995 1996	Kukkarinselkä; open water in the Suvasvesi lake.
Suvasvesi S	Simple? Complex?		~4	450			679	727	710	Cryogenian, possibly but unlikely Tonian	62.5924°N 28.2143°E	Kuopio / Leppävirta	2001 2002 2003	Haapaselkä; open water in the Suvasvesi lake.
Iso-Naakkima	Simple	< 4	2 - 3	450 - 600	160	N/A	900	1200		Stenian or Tonian	62.2023°N 27.1252°E	Pieksämäki / Mikkeli	1993	Buried, only partly under the Iso-Naakkima lake
Saarijärvi	Simple?	3.4	1.5 - 2	420			0	541		Cambrian to Quaternary	65.2915°N 28.3894°E	Taivalkoski	1997 1998 2013	Central part of the Saarijärvi lake.
Summanen	Simple?		2.6	640	200	41	2.588	1910		Orosirian to Neogene	62.6479°N 25.3782°E	Saarijärvi	2007 2018	Central part of the Summanen lake.
Karikkoselkä	Simple	3	1.3	640		26	230	260 - 458		(Late) Ordovician to (Early) Triassic	62.2212°N 25.2459°E	Petäjävesi	1996 1999 2000	Open water in Petäjävesi lake

Note 1: The "original" crater dimensions are coarse estimates. Original depths were calculated using the given original diameter using the Impact: Earth! program.

Note 2: "Current solid surface" topography is calculated from the deepest floor (regardless whether it is underwater or on dry land) to highest rim crest; other depth values give the depth of the floor in relation to the original terrain, thus excluding the rim and/or central uplift.

Note 3: Evidence for impact origin for a given structure is often provided in several publications. The year column includes some publications where some evidence of impact origin was provided even though an impact was not necessarily suggested by the authors; somewhere an impact was suggested even though the proof wasn't conclusive; and somewhere definite proof was provided.

General note 1: Crater sizes and shapes vary according to local differences. For example, depending on where you measure the crater diameter the result may vary (craters are seldom perfect circles). This is affected by, e.g., impact angle (low < 5-10 degree impact angles cause more elliptical craters) and local zones of weakness (may cause the crater to become polygonal).

General note 2: On Earth the (theoretical) transition diameter between simple and complex craters is 2 – 4 km. Such small craters may be either end member or some intermediate form, and thus the given dimension estimates may be off. The depth may be off by ~50 %.
