= Keurusselkä =

Lake in Finland

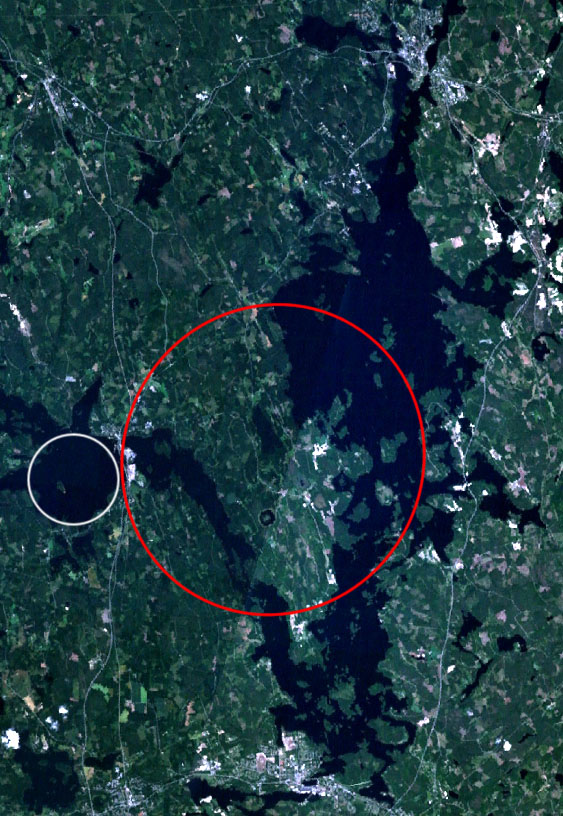
- Landsat 7 image of the Keurusselkä region from May 2006. Area where shatter cones have been found is marked with a red ellipse and the suggested impact structure of Ukonselkä is marked with a white circle.

- Location within Finland Location within Europe
- Location: Central Finland
- Coordinates: 62°11′N 24°41′E
- Basin countries: Finland
- Max. length: 27 km (17 mi)
- Surface area: 117.30 km^{2} (45.29 sq mi)
- Average depth: 6.4 m (21 ft)
- Max. depth: 40 m (130 ft)
- Surface elevation: 105.4 m (346 ft)
- Settlements: Keuruu, Mänttä

Keurusselkä is a lake in Central Finland between the towns of Keuruu to the north and Mänttä to the south. It covers an area of 117.3 km^{2} (45.3 sq mi). Its average depth is 6.4 m (21 ft) with a maximum depth of 40 m (130 ft). The surface lies at 105.4 m (346 ft) above sea level. The lake is 27 km (17 mi) long and is a part of the Kokemäenjoki River basin. Keurusselkä gained international publicity in 2004 when a pair of amateur geologists discovered an ancient impact structure on the western shore of the lake.

== Etymology ==
Keurusselkä was originally only the name of the largest fjard of the lake, while the lake was known as Väärinkeuru or Keuruvesi. The element keuru is a dialectal word meaning "crooked", in this context referring to the shape of the lake. The older names were displaced by the name Keurusselkä in the 19th century. The name of Keuruu is derived from the lake's name.

== Environmental issues ==
In 1986, the Keurusselkä region was heavily contaminated (70 kBq/m^{2}) by radioactive caesium, ^{137}Cs, from the Chernobyl disaster fallout. In 2003, some fish near Mänttä still had caesium concentrations several times higher than in Olkiluoto and Loviisa, which host the only two nuclear plants of Finland. This is due to the difference between the uptake of caesium in fresh water and brackish or saline water. However, the concentration levels are so small that eating the fish is not considered a health risk.

Apart from radioactivity, the water quality is also weakened by humic substances and local sewage. Despite that, the water quality is generally good, and the central part of the lake is in almost pristine condition. The lake is considered good for fishing, and the pike (Esox lucius) and perch (Perca fluviatilis) populations are especially large.

== Keurusselkä impact structure ==
Keurusselkä covers an ancient impact crater remnant, which was discovered in 2003 by amateur geologists. Shatter cones, horsetail-shaped formations in rocks specifically formed in meteor impacts, have been found in an 11.5 km (7.1 mi) wide area, but it is possible that the area containing shatter cones may be only the central uplift of the crater. Weak traces based on digital elevation data suggest possible ring structures from 10 km (6.2 mi) to as wide as about 30 km (19 mi) in diameter. This would make Keurusselkä the largest impact structure in Finland surpassing the Lappajärvi crater. In addition to the shatter cones, microscopic studies of samples from a breccia boulder have revealed shock metamorphic features, (planar fractures and planar deformation features) in quartz grains, which formed when the rock underwent extreme shock pressures of between 7–35 GPa (1,000,000–5,100,000 psi).

Argon-argon dating of a pseudotachylitic breccia from the central uplift of the Keurusselkä impact structure yielded a late Mesoproterozoic age of 1.14-1.15 Ga (thousand million years) for the impact., which makes Keurusselkä one of the oldest impact structures known in Europe. The age of the local granite bedrock of the Central Finland Granite Complex is 1.88 Ga (Paleoproterozoic). Since the impact, 7–8 km of rock has eroded away, leaving no visible depressions (compare, in contrast, Iso-Naakkima, Lumparn).

Sparse gravity data shows a negative anomaly (an area of lower gravity) in the area of the impact structure. However, there are other negative gravity anomalies nearby which are not believed to be related to the impact event. In addition, there are less dense felsic rocks in the western shore of the lake, which can contribute to the gravity low. The anomaly will be mapped in a much greater detail to determine if it is related to the impact event.

Airborne magnetic data show a strikingly circular magnetic anomaly, but for a reason not yet known it is slightly east from the gravity low area as well as the region where the shatter cones are found. It is possible that the ring was created for example by a granitic intrusion instead of the impact event. No specific anomalies have been found from radiometric or electromagnetic data. Paleomagnetic data will be collected to define the age of the structure.

Only some 30 km (19 mi) east from the centre of the Keurusselkä impact structure is Karikkoselkä, a much smaller and younger impact crater.

== See also ==
- Impact craters in Finland
