= Saarijärvi (disambiguation) =

Saarijärvi (literally "island lake") is a common name of lakes in Finland. It may mean:

- Saarijärvi, a municipality in Central Finland region
- Saarijärvi crater, a lake formed in an impact crater in Taivalkoski, Northern Ostrobothnia
- Saarijärvi, an older name for Tikka-Mannila, Jyväskylä, Central Finland
