= Lake Yanisyarvi =

Lake in Republic of Karelia, Russia

Yanisyarvi
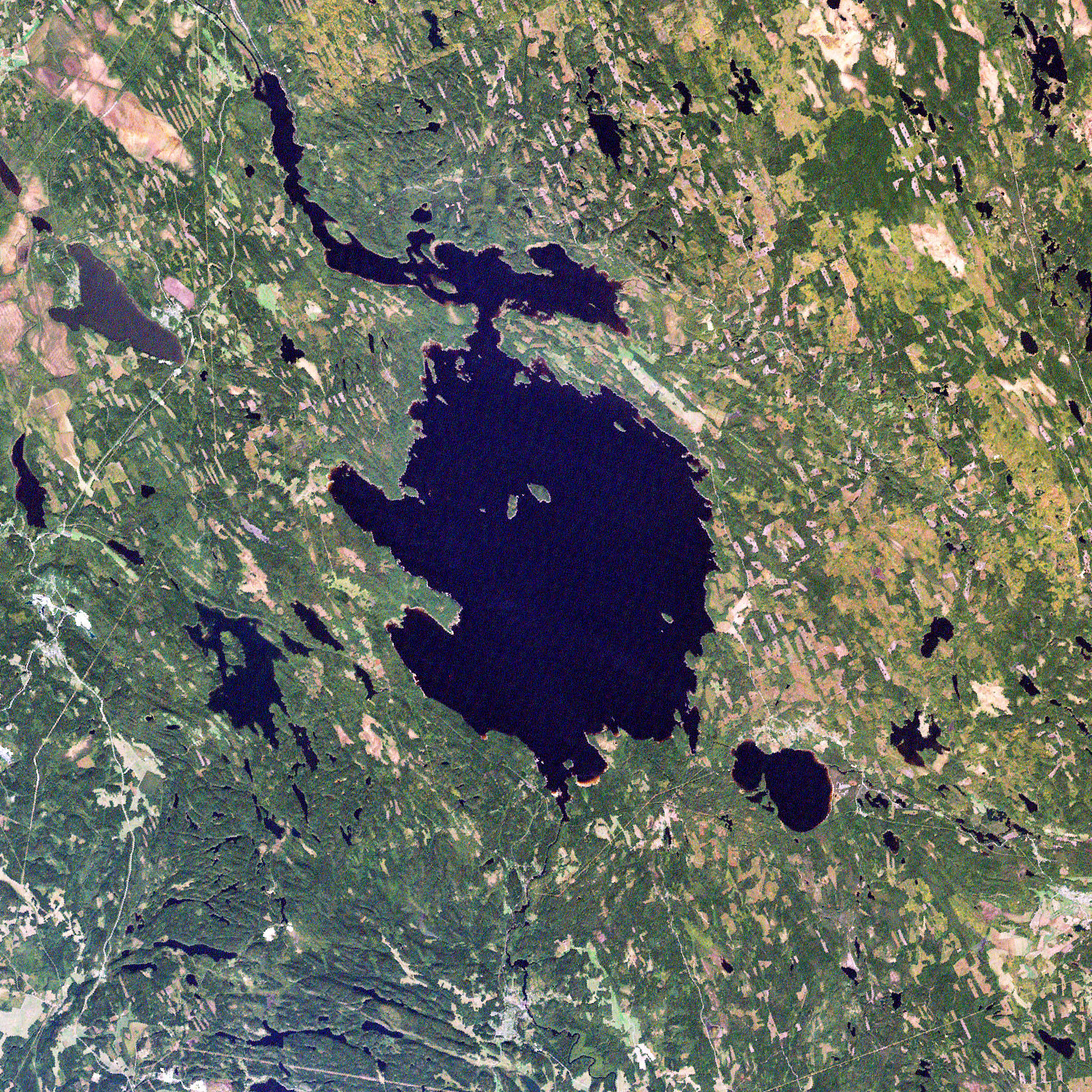

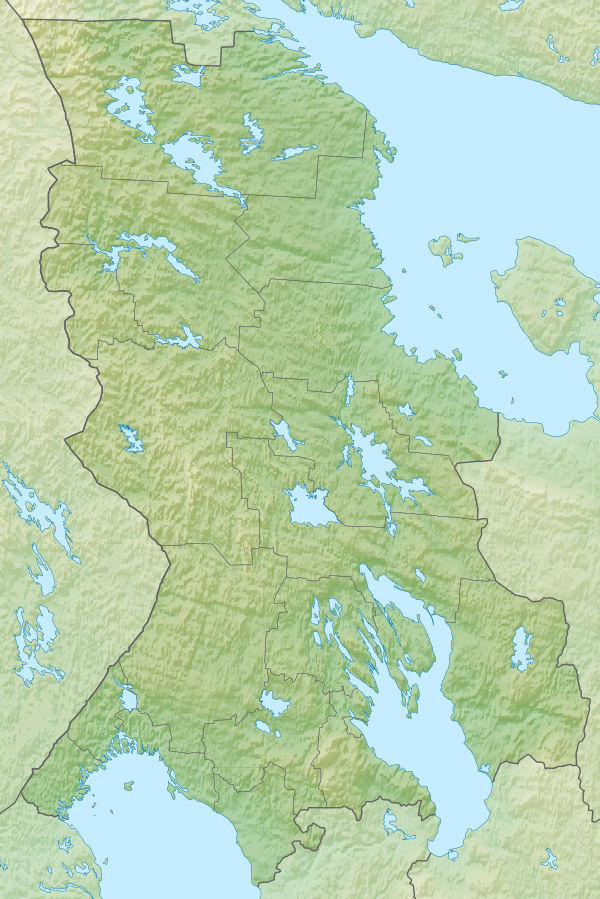
- Location within Russia Location within Karelia
- Location: Republic of Karelia
- Coordinates: 61°58′N 30°55′E
- Type: Impact crater lake
- Primary outflows: Jänisjoki
- Basin countries: Russia
- Average depth: 11.6 m (38 ft)
- Max. depth: 57 m (187 ft)

Lake Yanisyarvi (Russian: Янисъярви; Finnish: Jänisjärvi) is a lake in the Republic of Karelia, Russia, located north of and draining to Lake Ladoga.

The basin of this somewhat circular lake was formed by meteorite impact 700±5 million years ago during the Cryogenian period. The crater is 14 kilometers (8.7 mi) in diameter.

Prior to World War II, the lake was thought to be the second known volcanic caldera in Finland (the other was Lake Lappajärvi). Both were eventually recognized as impact craters.
