= Paasselkä devils =

Light phenomenon appearing around Lake Paasselkä, Finland

Coordinates: 62°09′N 29°25′E

Paasselkä devils (Finnish: Paasselän pirut) are light phenomena sometimes appearing at Lake Paasselkä, Finland and swampy and forested areas nearby the lake.

Paasselkä is a lake formed in an impact crater. There is a magnetic anomaly in the centre of the lake.

The Paasselkä Devil is usually said to be a ball of light visible in the air above Paasselkä or areas nearby. It is said to move at varying speeds on some occasions and to remain stationary at others. Sometimes there are several balls. The "ball of fire" has been said by some locals to act as if it were conscious. It can follow fishermen's boats or escape the light of torch. Sometimes the light moves at incredible speeds.

The light has been visible for a long time; it is a part of local folklore and was given the name "devil". Locals in earlier times may have believed that the ball of light was actually an evil creature. In earlier times local people were used to seeing these lights and did not consider them to be something extraordinary. The lights are still observed occasionally, and have been caught on film and photographed. This light phenomenon became more widely known through a 2006 book by Sulo Strömberg containing stories about the phenomenon.

== See also ==
- Will-o'-the-wisps
