= Orivirran saarto =

Coordinates: 62.158°N 29.221°E

Orivirran saarto is a ruin of a 16th-century fortress located in Savonranta, Finland. It is believed to be built some time between 1540 and 1550 and was used until the beginning of the 17th century. Its status was to be an early warning for the St. Olaf's Castle which is still located 50 km to south. It has a four cornered layout with dimensions of 60 m by 20 m build from stones and an outer fortress around 65 m by 75 m. When operational it had 300 to 400 soldiers and 5 to 10 cannons.

In 1592 Russians and Cossacks destroyed the fortress. It did not survive after that and today there exists only some ruins of the fortress with a memorial stone (1965, H. Havas).

== Sources ==
- https://web.archive.org/web/20070821230521/http://www.savonranta.fi/orivirta.html and
- "Vanhan Kerimäen historia", in Finnish, ISBN 951-96673-1-8, and "Savonrannan kunnan historia", ISBN 951-98705-0-4
