= Lake Orivesi =

Lake of Finland, part of Saimaa

Orivesi
- Location within Finland

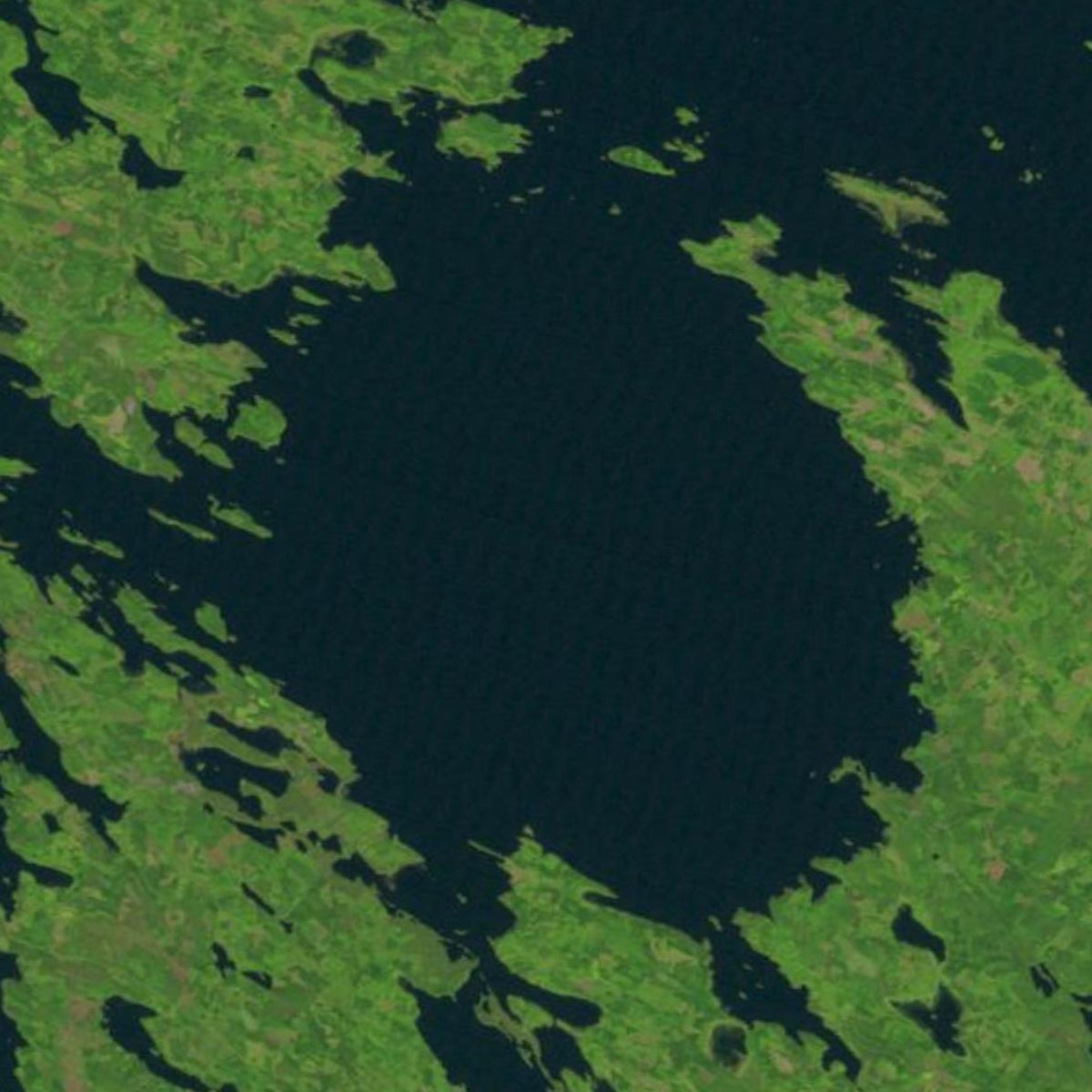
- Location: southeastern Finland
- Coordinates: 62°16′N 29°24′E
- Primary inflows: straits of Rääkkylä
- Primary outflows: straits of Savonlinna, Tappuvirta
- Basin countries: Finland
- Surface area: 601.30 km^{2} (232.16 sq mi)
- Average depth: 9.16 m (30.1 ft)
- Max. depth: 74 m (243 ft)
- Water volume: 5.507 km^{3} (4,465,000 acre⋅ft)
- Shore length^{1}: 1,332.47 km (827.96 mi)
- Surface elevation: 75.9 m (249 ft)
- Islands: Varpasalo, Siikasaari
- Settlements: Liperi, Rääkkylä, Savonranta
- ^{1} Shore length is not a well-defined measure.

Orivesi is a large lake in Finland, belonging to the municipalities of Kitee (including Kesälahti), Liperi and Rääkkylä in North Karelia, as well as Savonlinna (Kerimäki and Savonranta) in South Savo. The area of the lake is 601.30 km² (7th largest). Orivesi is one of the major basins of Saimaa. The lake has numerous islands and several open lake areas including Paasselkä, an ancient impact crater in south.

The name of Orivesi and that of Orivirta, its outflow into Pyyvesi in central Savonranta, contain the word ori 'stallion', but it is not known whether the outflow was named after the lake or vice versa.
