= Mistastin crater =

Mistastin Crater
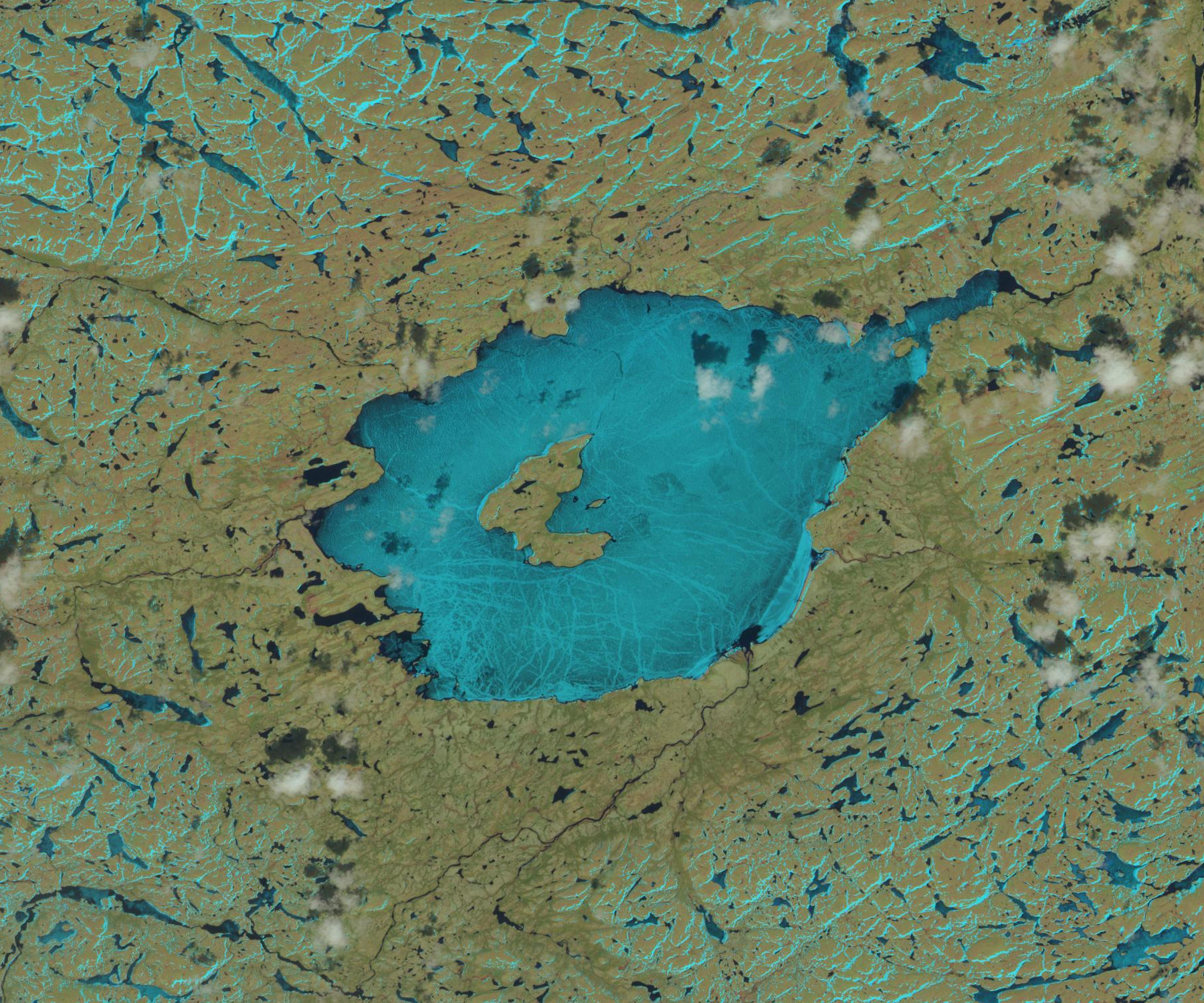
- The crater in 2020

- Location within Newfoundland and Labrador
- Location: Newfoundland and Labrador, Canada; 55°53′N 63°18′W

Impact crater structure
- Confidence: Confirmed
- Diameter: 28 km (17 mi) (original); 19 km (12 mi)
- Age: 36.6 million years
- Exposed: Yes
- Drilled: Yes
- Topo map: Canada NTS 13M14 Mistastin Lake

Mistastin Lake
- Location within Newfoundland and Labrador
- Coordinates: 55°53′N 63°18′W
- Type: Impact crater lake
- Basin countries: Canada
- Max. length: 19 km (12 mi)
- Max. width: 12 km (7.5 mi)
- Surface area: 145 km^{2} (56 sq mi)
- Surface elevation: 338 metres (1,109 ft)
- Islands: Mishta-minishtikᐡ

Mistastin Crater is an impact crater in Newfoundland and Labrador, Canada, which contains the roughly circular Mistastin Lake. The lake is around 16 km (9.9 mi) in diameter, while the estimated diameter of the original crater is 28 km (17 mi). The age of the crater is calculated to be 36.6 ± 2 million years.

The lake was first identified as a possible impact crater in 1968, after being viewed from space.

It is a site for field geology training for astronauts from the Canadian Space Agency (CSA) and NASA, including members of the Artemis II Moon mission crew.

== Location ==
Mistastin crater, aka Kamestastin, is located in northwestern inland Labrador, due west of Natuashish, near Quebec. It lies within the traditional hunting grounds of the Mushuau Innu First Nation. Although it is not within a declared reserve, it does require permission to visit.

== Formation and geology ==
The Mistastin Impact occurred around 36.6 million years ago. The presence of cubic zirconia around the crater rim suggests that the impact generated temperatures in excess of 4,300 °F (2,370 °C) — roughly 43% that of the surface of the Sun and the highest crustal temperatures known on Earth — and produced global changes that lasted for decades after the impact.

Mishta-minishtikᐡ, the lake's arcuate central island, is interpreted to be the central uplift of the complex crater structure. The target rocks were part of a batholith composed of adamellite, mangerite and lenses of anorthosite. There are abundant shock metamorphic features exhibited in the rocks of the island. Planar deformation features, diaplectic glass, melt rocks, and shatter cones have been identified.

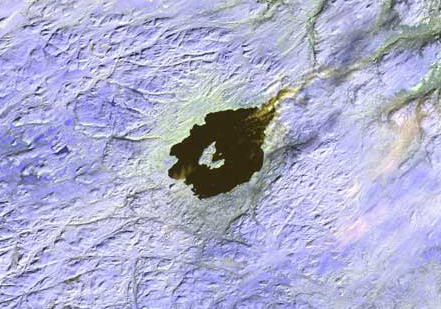
