= Toivo Turtiainen =

Finnish politician

Toivo Antti Turtiainen (14 October 1883 – 12 September 1920) was a Finnish politician. He was born in Savonranta, and was a Member of the Parliament of Finland from 1919 until his death in 1920, representing the Social Democratic Party of Finland (SDP). Brother of Aino Kuusinen.
