= Summasjärvi =

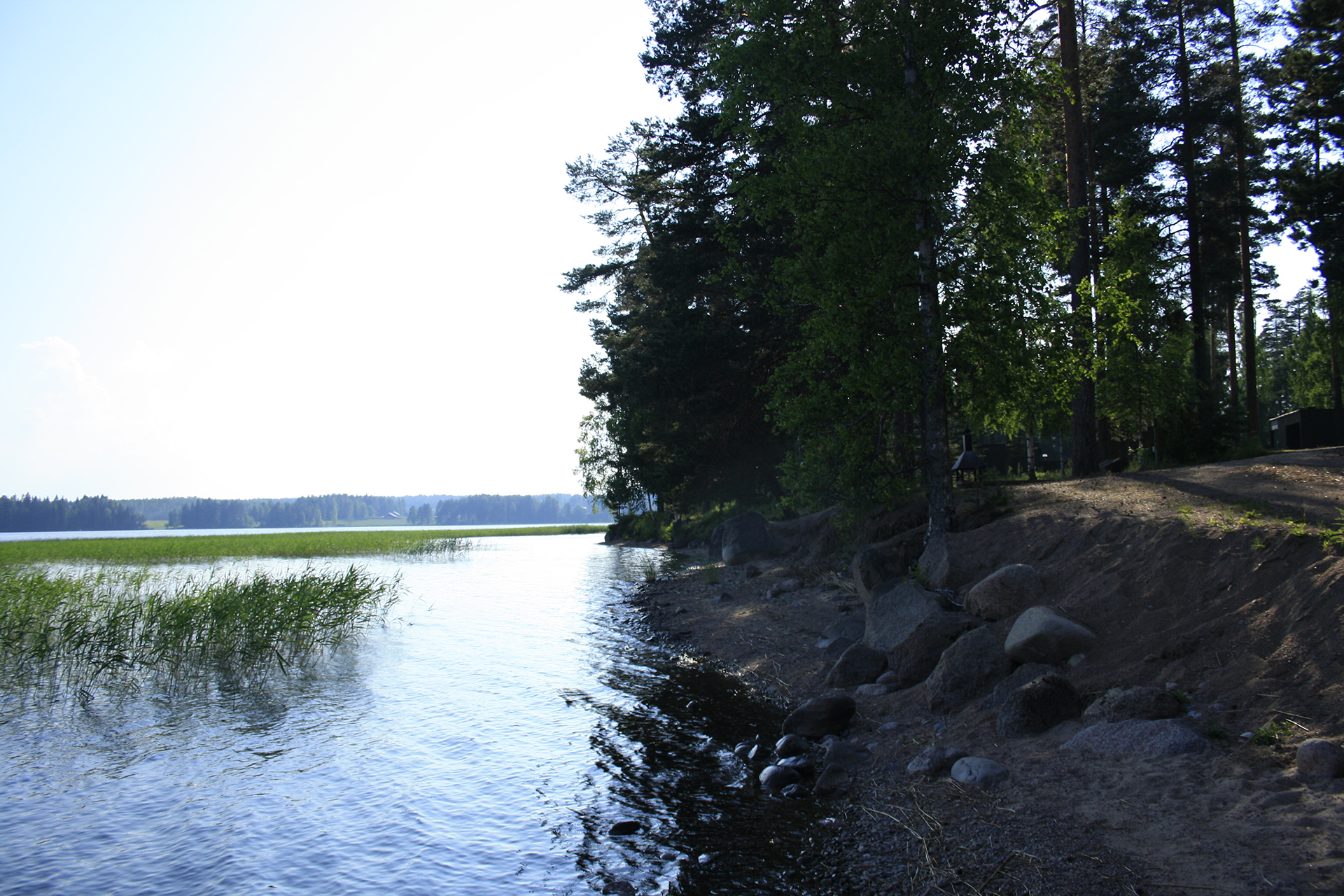

- Location within Finland
- Coordinates: 62°39′N 25°24′E
- Type: Lake
- Catchment area: Kymijoki
- Basin countries: Finland
- Surface area: 21.9 km^{2} (8.5 sq mi)
- Average depth: 6.73 m (22.1 ft)
- Max. depth: 41 m (135 ft)
- Water volume: 0.147 km^{3} (119,000 acre⋅ft)
- Shore length^{1}: 50.15 km (31.16 mi)
- Islands: Summassaari, Lamposaari
- ^{1} Shore length is not a well-defined measure.

Lake Summanen (Finnish: Summasjärvi, Summanen) is a medium-sized lake of Finland. It is located in Saarijärvi, in the region of Keski-Suomi. There is a Stone Age Museum in the island of Summassaari.

== The Summanen crater ==
The 12th impact crater identified in Finland is located at the center of the lake. The crater is 2.6 kilometers wide, ~200 meters deep, and mostly buried under later sediments. The age of the crater is not known. It formed before the Quaternary glaciation, but on the other hand after the host rock which formed in the Svecofennian orogeny 1910 million years ago. (Plado et al. assume the impact was Phanerozoic, but give no evidence to support this.)

The otherwise shallow lake (depth <10 m) has a 41 m central deep or trench at the crater site. The location is also occupied by a significant, circular electromagnetic anomaly (with more conductive materials at the site). The anomaly is supposedly the result of a 100 to 200 m thick subsurface lens, presumably formed of fractured rock with saline liquids. The impact origin was inferred from the anomaly and the deep, and proven by identifying shatter cones and planar deformation features in glacial erratics adjacent to the crater.

== See also ==
- List of lakes in Finland
- Impact craters in Finland
