= Aino Kuusinen =

Finnish Communist who worked for Comintern around the world

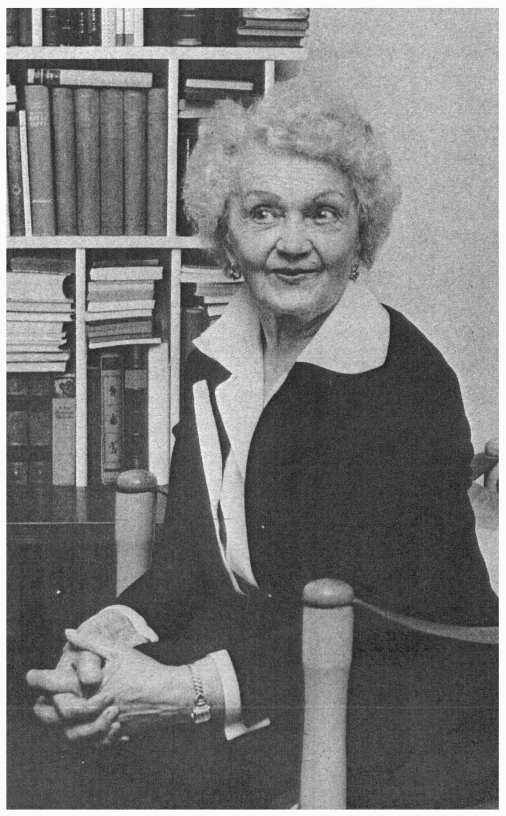
- 1965
- Born: Aino Maria Turtiainen; 5 March 1886; Savonranta, Grand Duchy of Finland
- Died: 1 September 1970 (aged 84)
- Spouse: Otto Wille Kuusinen
- Relatives: Toivo Turtiainen (brother)

Aino Maria Kuusinen (née Turtiainen, subsequently Sarola; 5 March 1886 – 1 September 1970) was a Finnish Communist who worked for Comintern around the world in the 1930s, and was imprisoned in the gulag before she escaped to the West. Aino Kuusinen was Otto Wille Kuusinen's second wife.

== Life ==
Aino Kuusinen was a nursing educator. She spent four years in the Ophthalmology Hospital at the Helsinki Surgical Hospital. Upon graduation, on 9 July 1909, Kuusinen married Leo Sarola, who worked as an engineer at the Railway Administration.

Aino Kuusinen met Otto Wille Kuusinen for the first time in the autumn of 1919 in Tapanila, Helsinki, where she lived with her husband. Kuusinen was then secretly in Finland and his friends stayed for a few nights with Leo and Aino Sarola. Kuusinen left Finland in the spring of 1920 to Sweden, where he lived for some time and began sending letters to Aino.

In 1922, she moved to the Soviet Union where she worked for Comintern until a military inquiry was sent to GRU. Between 1930 and 1933, a secret companion, Morton, used Kuusinen to remain Communist in the United States.

From the United States, Aino Kuusinen moved to Japan, where she was introduced to the correspondent of the German Frankfurter Zeitung, Richard Sorge, who was later executed in Japan. From Japan, Kuusinen was called to Moscow where she was arrested on New Year's Day in 1938. After Joseph Stalin's death, Aino Kuusinen was released in 1955, and spent the following years in Moscow deeply disgusted with her former husband Otto Wille Kuusinen, who had done nothing to liberate her.

In 1965, Aino Kuusinen traveled to Finland and from there to Italy, where she wrote her memoirs, ordering them to be published only after her death.

== Works ==
- Kuusinen, Aino: Jumala syöksee enkelinsä: Muistelmat vuosilta 1919–1965. (Der Gott stürzt seine Engel: Memoiren 1917–1965.) Saksankielisestä käsikirjoituksesta suomentanut A. Vuoristo. Jälkilause: Wolfgang Leonhard. Helsinki: Otava, 1972.
- Kuusinen, Aino: Before and After Stalin: A Personal Account of Soviet Russia from the 1920s to the 1960s. Published by Michael Joseph, London, 1974. ISBN 0-718-11248-2.
- Лурье, Вячеслав Михайлович – Кочик, Валерий Яковлевич: ГРУ: дела и люди (Россия в лицах). Олма-Пресс, 2003. ISBN 5-7654-1499-0.
