= Paasselkä =

- Location within Finland

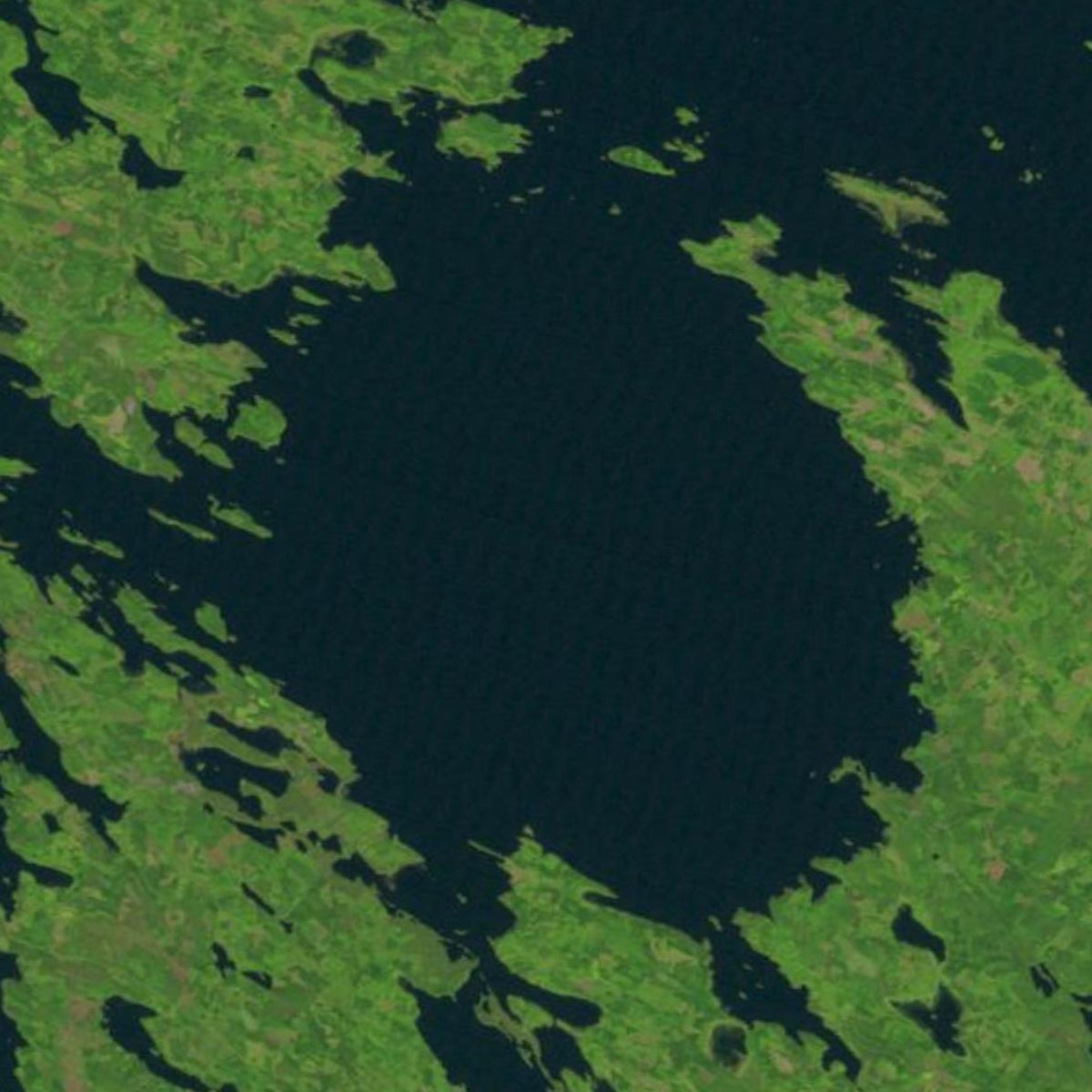
- Location: Southern Savonia, Finland
- Coordinates: 62°09′N 29°25′E
- Type: Impact crater lake
- Basin countries: Finland
- Max. length: 13 km (8.1 mi)
- Max. width: 9 km (5.6 mi)
- Max. depth: 75 m (246 ft)
- Surface elevation: 60 m (200 ft)
- Settlements: Savonranta

Paasselkä (earlier Paasivesi, both names roughly mean 'Stone lake') is an oval-shaped lake formed in an eroded impact crater in Southern Savonia, Finland. The lake, which is a part of Orivesi, which is in turn part of the Greater Saimaa, is devoid of islands which makes it different from other lakes in the region. Paasselkä is also unusually deep, 75 m at the deepest point.

The Paasselkä impact occurred roughly <1800 million years ago (Statherian period of the Paleoproterozoic) and affected Paleoproterozoic crystalline rocks and some overlying sandstones of the Baltic Shield. Because of the unusual shape and associated magnetic anomalies, Paasselkä was suspected to have an impact origin long until it was confirmed after a deep drilling in 1999 making it the ninth known impact crater in Finland. Unlike many Finnish craters, it does not seem to have been buried under layers of sediment.

== Paasselkä devils ==
Paasselän pirut, or Paasselkä devils, is a claimed will-o'-the-wisp phenomenon which sometimes occurs at the lake and the marsh and forest area in the immediate vicinity. One has described the light as a ball that moves at different speeds, or are completely at rest, and sometimes there are several spheres. The phenomenon has been known for a long time, written down from the 18th century, and is part of the local folk tales, which have given the name "devils". The locals thought the shining spheres were created by evil beings. The magnetic anomalies in connection with the impact crater might be related to the phenomenon.

== See also ==
- Paasselkä devils
- Impact craters in Finland
