= Sääksjärvi (Kokemäki) =

Lake of Kokemäki, Finland

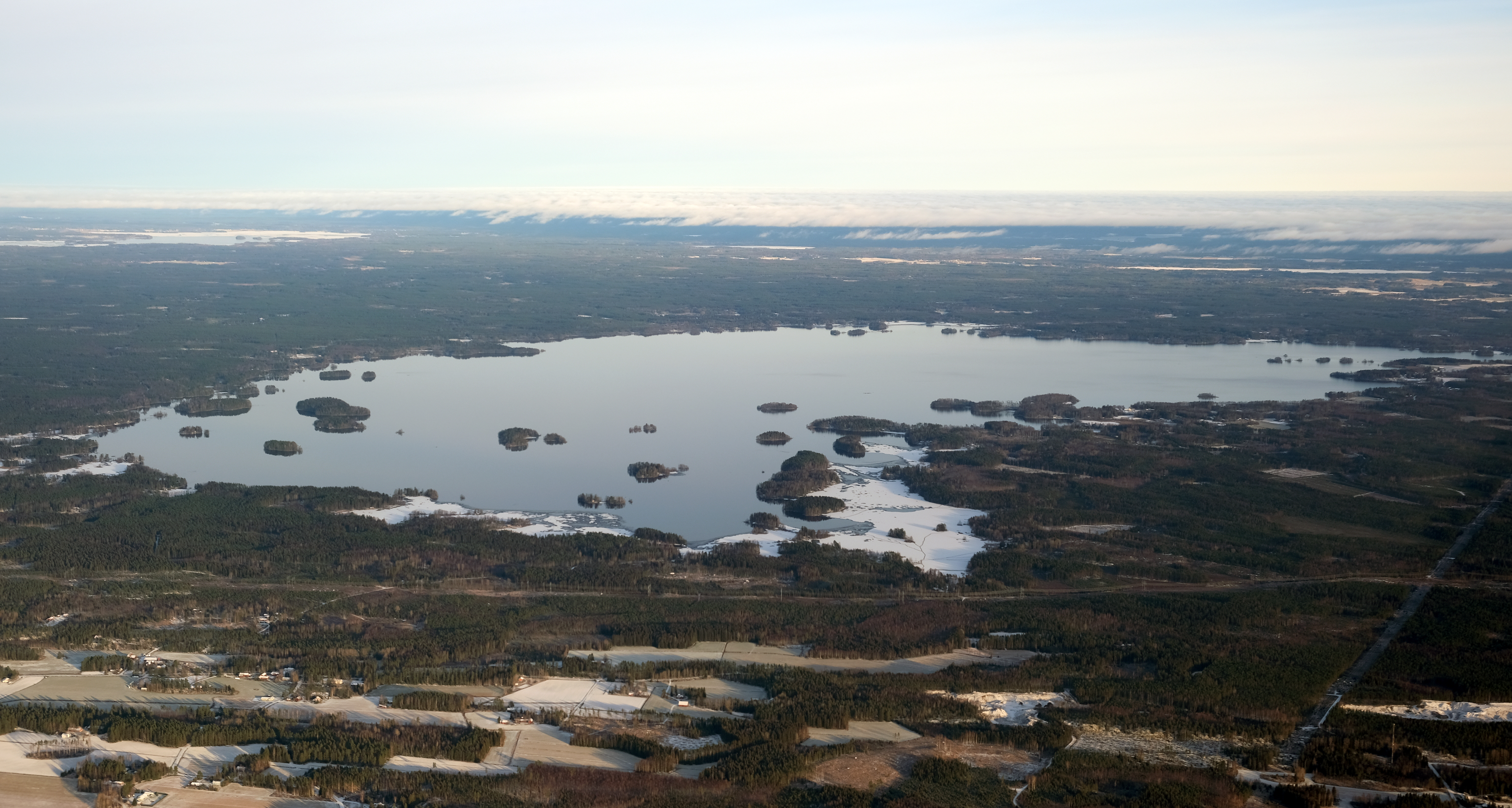

- Location within Finland

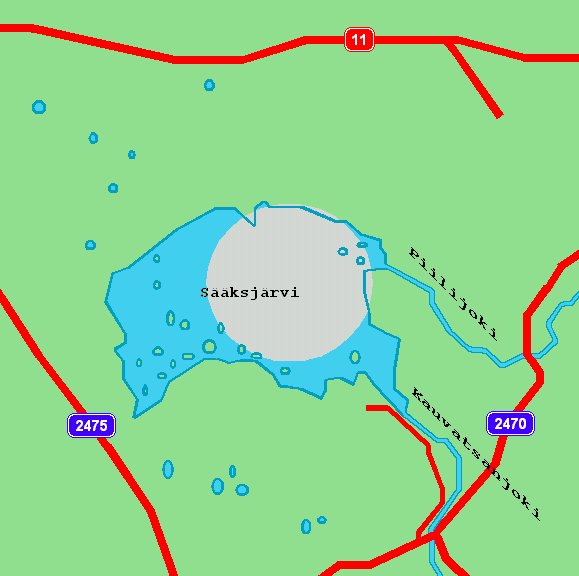
- Map: crater area in grey
- Location: Kokemäki, Satakunta, Finland
- Coordinates: 61°24′N 022°24′E
- Type: Impact crater lake
- Basin countries: Finland
- Surface area: 33.18 km^{2} (12.81 sq mi)
- Surface elevation: 49 m (161 ft)

Sääksjärvi (Finnish pronunciation: [ˈsæːksˌjærʋi]) is a lake in Kokemäki, Satakunta, western Finland, east from the town of Pori. The lake is notable because it overlies an impact crater.

The crater is 5 kilometres (3 mi) in diameter and is completely buried under the lake and is not visible at the surface. The age of the impact structure is estimated to be about 543 ± 12 Ma (million years ago), at the boundary between the Ediacaran and Cambrian periods. There are impactite rocks in the southwestern region from the crater confirming its extraterrestrial origin. At the time of its discovery, only one impact crater (Lappajärvi) was known in Finland.

== See also ==
- Impact craters in Finland
