= Zapadnaya crater =

- Location within Ukraine
- Location: Bilylivka, Zhytomyr Oblast, Ukraine; 49°44′N 29°0′E

Impact crater structure
- Confidence: Confirmed
- Diameter: 3.2 km (2.0 mi)
- Age: 165 ± 5 Ma; Middle Jurassic
- Exposed: No
- Drilled: Yes

Zapadnaya (Bilylivka) is an impact crater in Ukraine near the village of Bilylivka in the southeasternmost edge of Zhytomyr Oblast and near the border of Vinnytsia Oblast. It is situated in the northwestern part of the Ukrainian crystalline shield.

It is 3.2 kilometres (2.0 mi) in diameter and the age is estimated to be 165 ± 5 million years, placing it in the Middle Jurassic. The crater is not exposed at the surface.
