= Fasta Åland =

Largest and most populous island of Åland in Finland

Native name: Fasta Åland
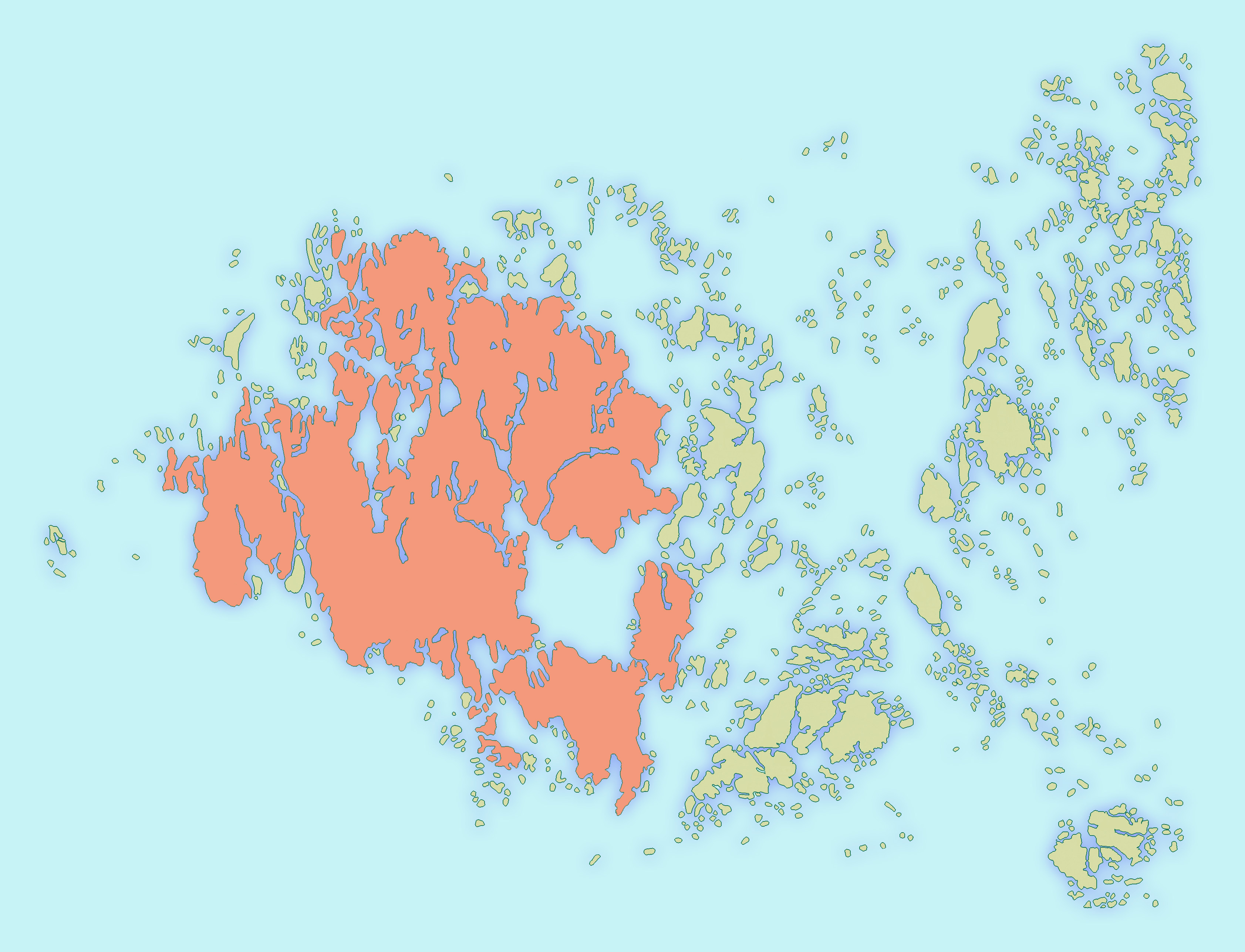

- Location within Finland

Geography
- Location: Baltic Sea
- Coordinates: 60°08′53″N 19°47′18″E
- Archipelago: Åland
- Area: 685 km^{2} (264 sq mi)

Administration
- Finland
- Province: Åland
- Largest settlement: Mariehamn (pop. 11,048)

Fasta Åland (Finnish: Manner-Ahvenanmaa or Ahvenanmanner, meaning mainland Åland) is the largest and most populous island of Åland, an autonomous province of Finland. The island is home to the provincial capital Mariehamn. About ninety percent of the archipelago's population lives on Fasta Åland. Its area is difficult to estimate due to its irregular shape and coastline, but estimates range from 740 square kilometres (290 sq mi) to 879 square kilometres (339 sq mi) to over 1,010 square kilometres (390 sq mi), depending on what is included or excluded. Even at the minimum estimate, Fasta Åland is Finland's largest and most populous island, with about 27,000 people. Its highest point is 129 metres (423 feet).

On the east side of Fasta Åland is a large bay, Lumparn, which is now believed to be the impact crater from a meteorite impact about one billion years ago.
