= Pilot crater =

Crater lake in Canada

Pilot Lake
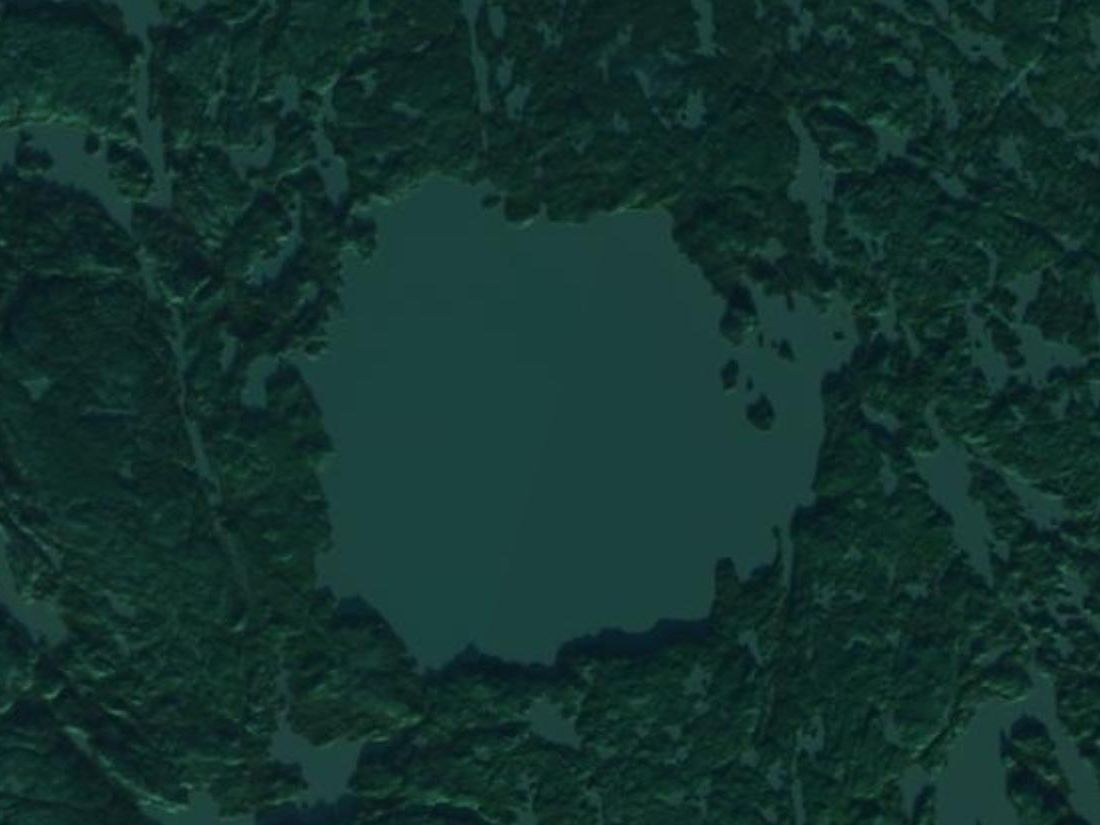
- Satellite image (Landsat)

- Location within Northwest Territories
- Location: Northwest Territories
- Coordinates: 60°17′N 111°0′W
- Type: Impact crater lake
- Basin countries: Canada
- Surface area: 43 km^{2} (17 sq mi)
- Max. depth: 90 m (300 ft)
- Surface elevation: 255 m (837 ft)
- Islands: 9

Pilot crater is an impact crater in the Northwest Territories, Canada, just north of the Alberta border and near Fort Smith 54 km (34 mi). It is 6 km (3.7 mi) in diameter and the age is estimated to be 445 ± 2 million years (Upper Ordovician).

The crater contains Pilot Lake, a pristine fresh-water lake that covers 43 km^{2} (17 mi^{2}) and is 90 m (300 ft) deep. Lake trout, northern pike, whitefish, and pickerel are plentiful, supporting a summer market for recreational fishing.
