= Pyyvesi =

Lake in Savonlinna, Finland

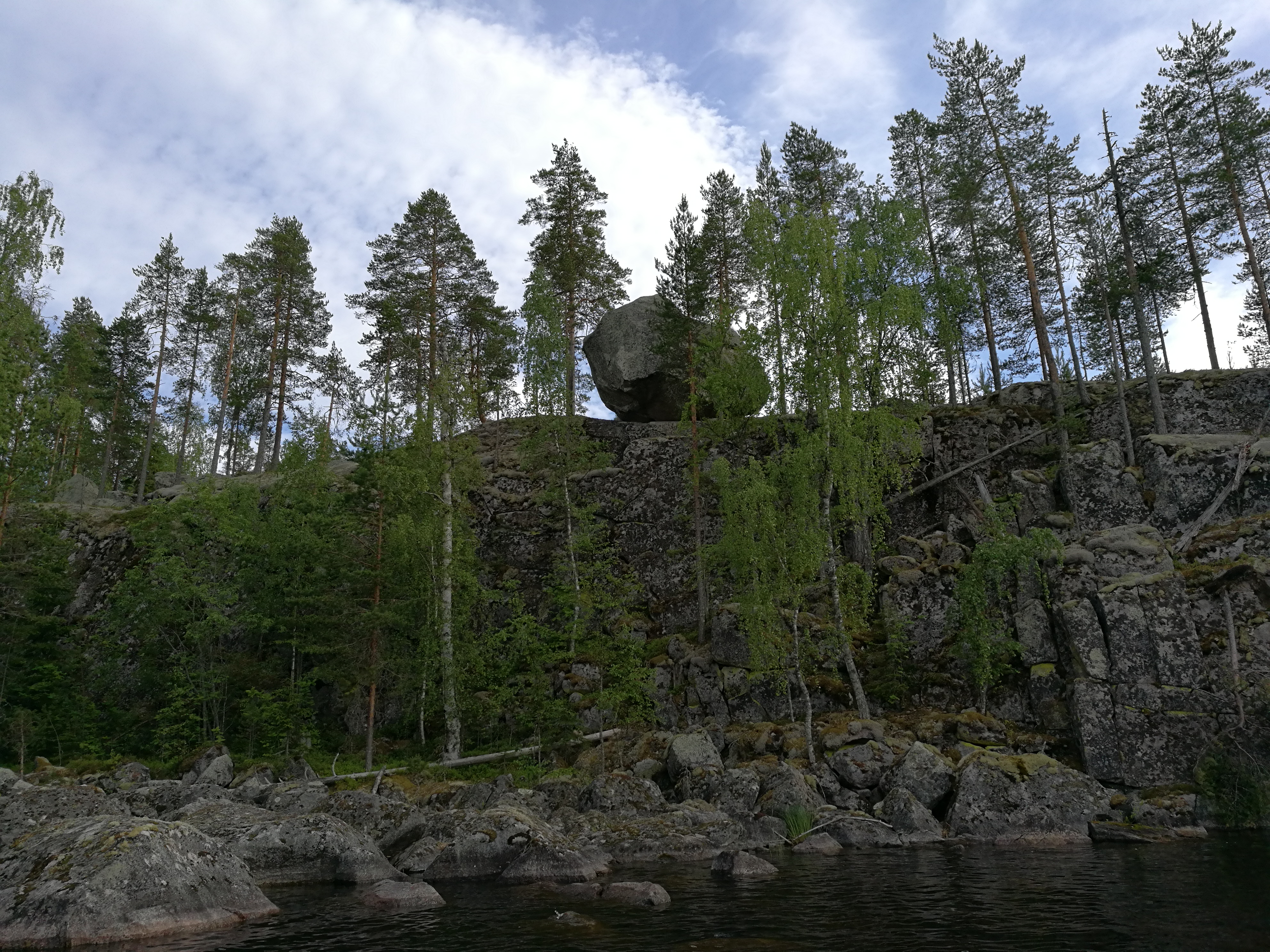
- A giant rock on the coast of Pyyvesi lake at Savonranta, Savonlinna, Finland.

- Location within Finland
- Coordinates: 62°10′N 29°10′E
- Basin countries: Finland
- Surface area: 29.751 km^{2} (11.487 sq mi)
- Average depth: 10.62 m (34.8 ft)
- Max. depth: 47.15 m (154.7 ft)
- Water volume: 0.316 km^{3} (256,000 acre⋅ft)
- Shore length^{1}: 150.64 km (93.60 mi)
- Surface elevation: 75.8 m (249 ft)
- Frozen: December–April
- Islands: Metsosaari
- Settlements: Savonranta
- ^{1} Shore length is not a well-defined measure.

Pyyvesi is a medium-sized lake of South Savo region in Finland. It belongs to Vuoksi main catchment area.

== See also ==
- List of lakes in Finland
