= Söderfjärden =

Impact crater in Ostrobothnia, Finland

Coordinates: 63°00′18″N 21°34′30″E

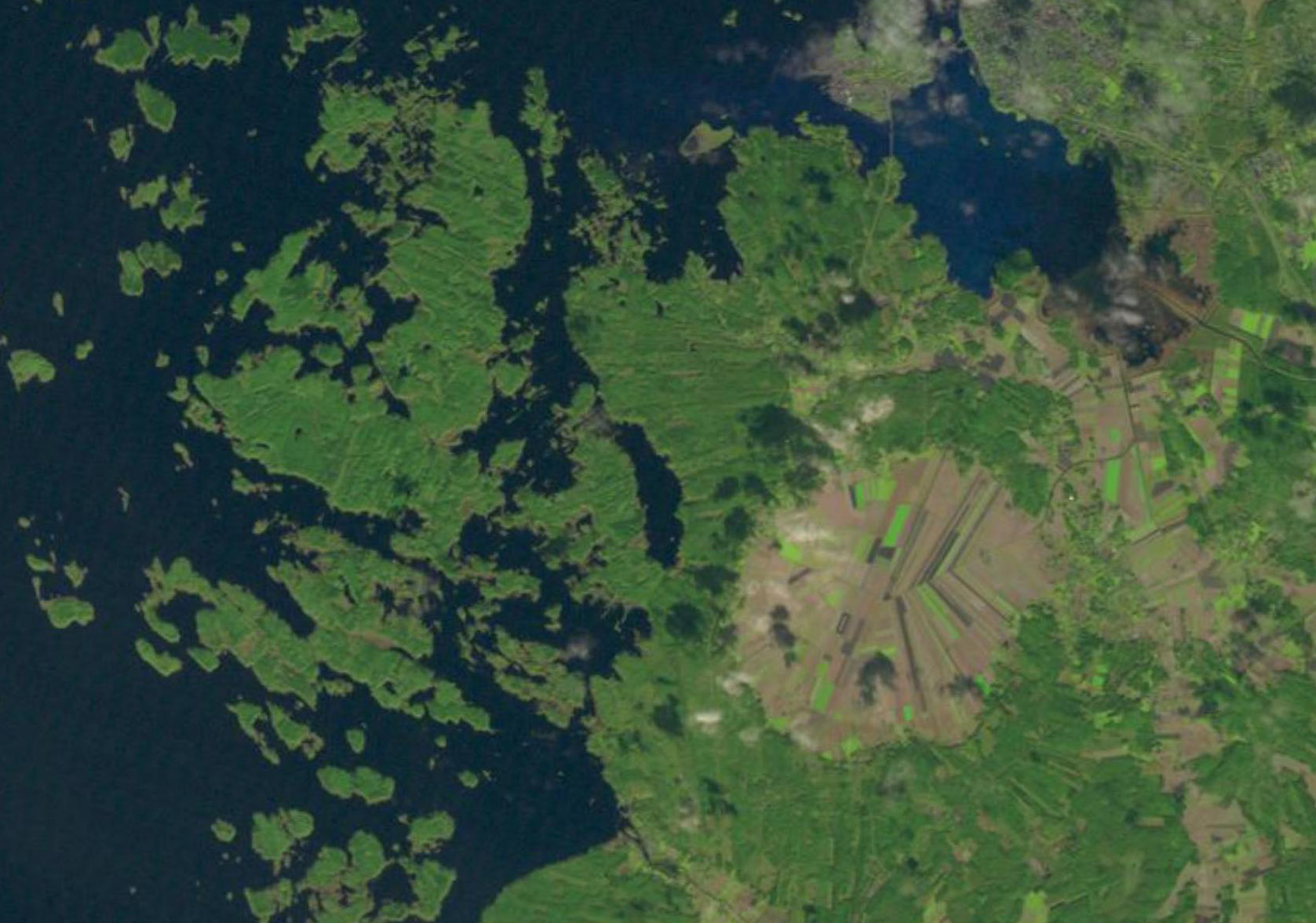
- Söderfjärden is visible as the hexagonal cultivated area in this Landsat image
- Location: Vaasa, Finland

Impact crater structure
- Confidence: Confirmed
- Diameter: 6.6 kilometres (4.1 mi)
- Depth: 300 metres (980 ft)
- Age: 640 Ma
- Exposed: No
- Drilled: Yes

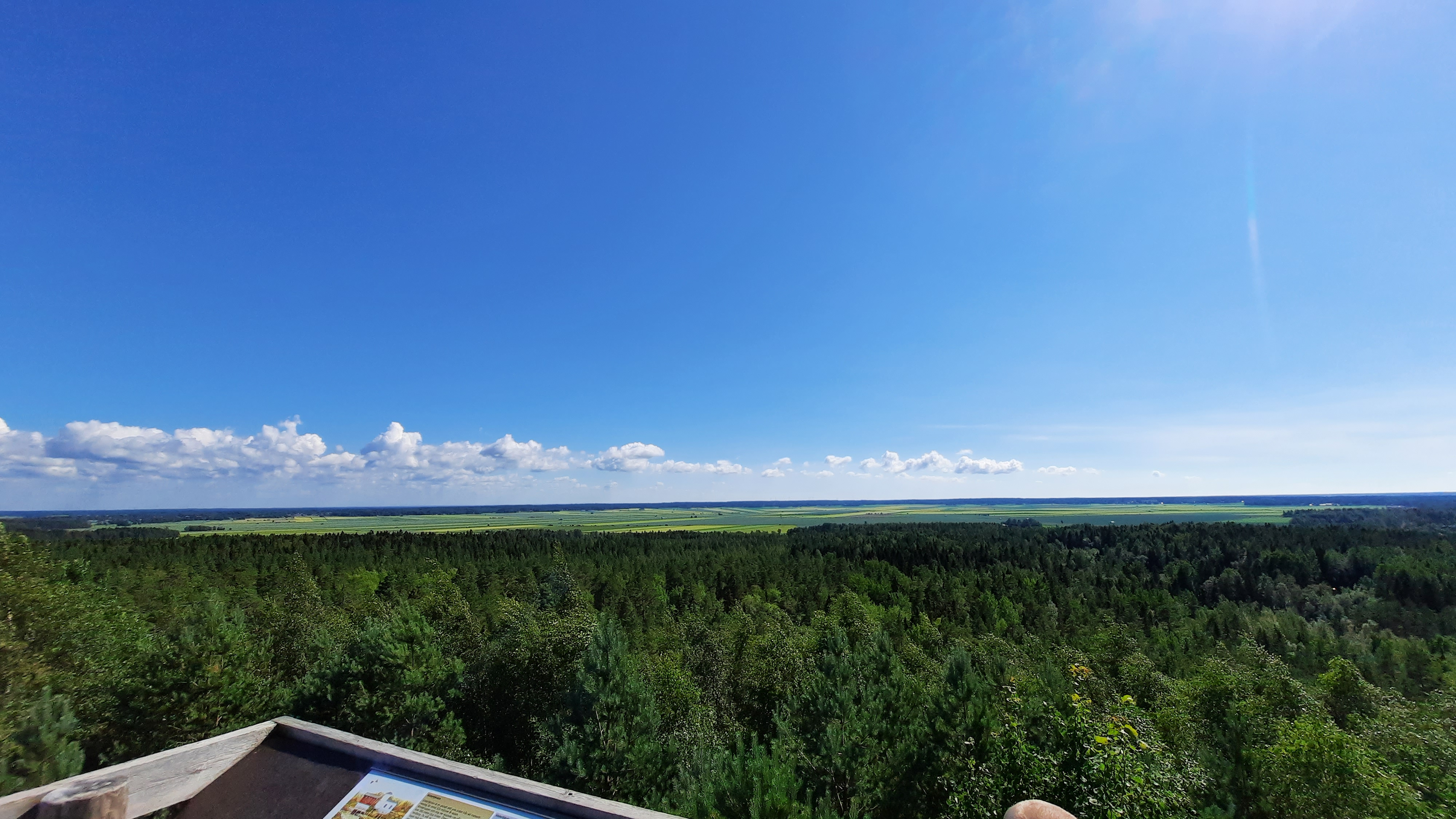
View of the basin of the crater remnant from Öjberget, a hill that belongs to the crater rim

Söderfjärden is a polder in Ostrobothnia, western Finland, 10 kilometres south of the town of Vaasa. The plain is in an impact crater dating back to more than 640 million years ago (Proterozoic, near the end of the Cryogenian). The crater's diameter is 6.6 kilometres (4.1 mi) and its maximum depth is 300 metres (980 ft). It is filled with Cambrian sandstones leaving only the outer rim visible. There is also a central uplift, which is buried. After rising from the sea due to post-glacial rebound, Söderfjärden was a wetland but was later drained with help of a pump station. It is currently cultivated and is clearly visible from air as a large hexagonal field. This makes Söderfjärden unique among the other impact structures in Finland which are at least partially below sea level. The area of the basin is divided half and half between Vaasa and Korsholm, with a small corner belonging to Malax.

== See also ==
- Impact craters in Finland
