= Hummeln structure =

Impact crater in Sweden

- Location within Sweden
- Location: Småland, Sweden; 57°22′N 16°15′E

Impact crater structure
- Confidence: Confirmed
- Diameter: 1.2 km (0.75 mi)
- Age: 443-470 Ma; Ordovician
- Exposed: Yes
- Drilled: No
- Bolide type: Chondrite; Ordovician meteor event?

The Hummeln structure was confirmed, in 2015, as an impact crater in Småland province, Sweden. It is a 1.2 kilometres (0.75 mi) wide depression within Lake Hummeln and is estimated to have formed between 470 and 443 Ma ago, during the Ordovician.

== Description ==
The depression was first described in 1826 but was considered to be the result of volcanism or tectonics. In the 1960s, mapping of the lake topography gave the first hints of an impact event. More conclusive evidence was found recently when scientists from Lund University, while trying to get to nearby Siljan crater, found shocked quartz around the lake. Further investigation led to more details such as breccia that firmly established the structure's impact nature.

It has also been suggested that this structure, the nearby Granby crater, and other coeval small craters in Baltoscandia may be connected to the Ordovician meteor event of 470 Ma.

== See also ==
- Ordovician meteor event
- Granby crater
