= Zeleny Gai crater =

Coordinates: 48°4′N 32°45′E

- Location: Ukraine

Impact crater structure
- Confidence: Confirmed
- Diameter: 3.5 kilometres (2.2 mi)
- Age: 80 ± 20 Ma

Zeleny Gai is an impact crater in Ukraine (Kirovohrad Oblast).

It is 3.5 kilometres (2.2 mi) in diameter and the age is estimated to be 80 ± 20 million years (Upper Cretaceous). The crater is not exposed at the surface.
