= Bilylivka =

Village in Ruzhyn Raion, Zhytomyr Oblast, Ukraine

Coordinates: 49°40′34″N 29°0′30″E

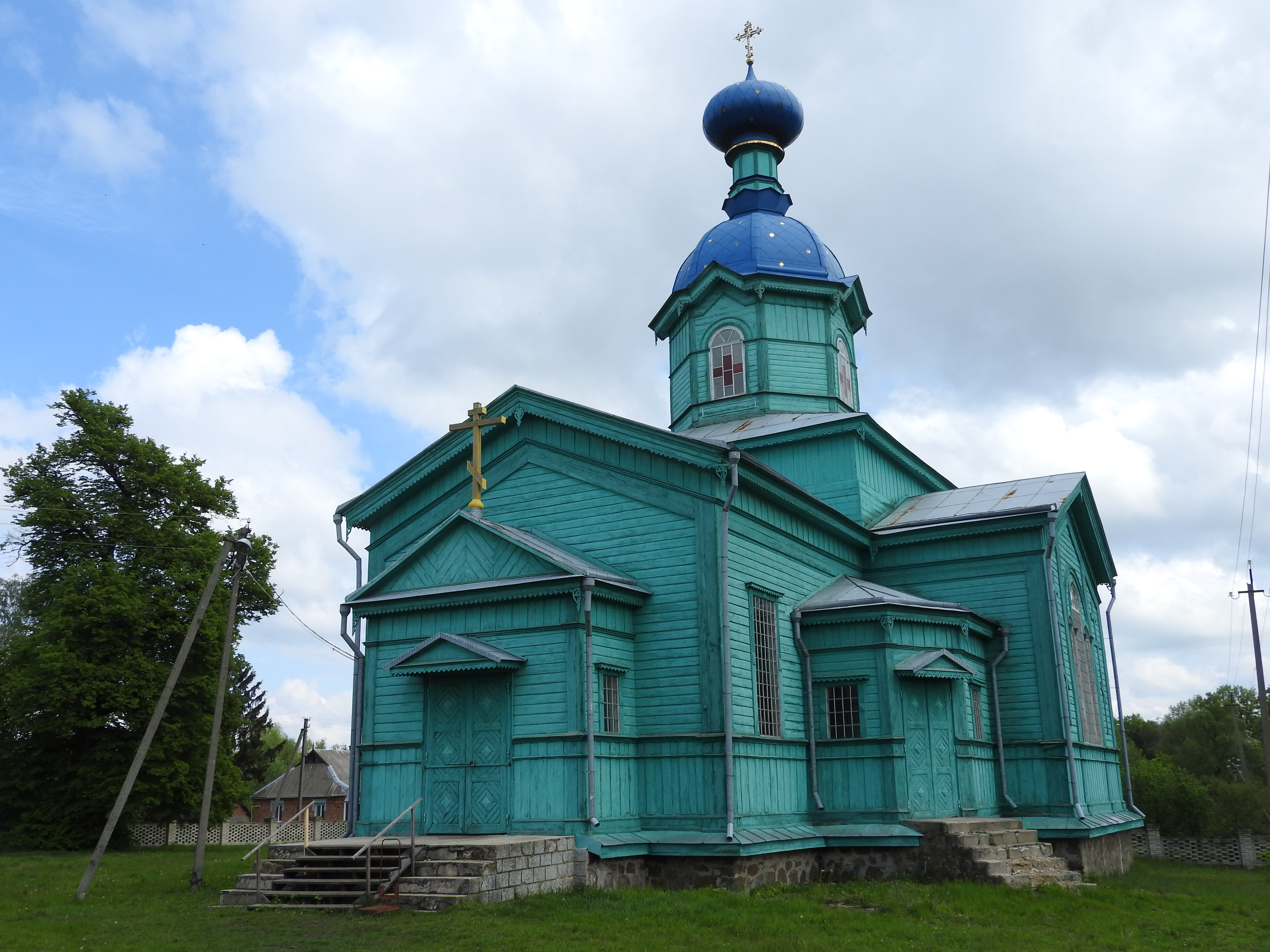

Bilylivka (Ukrainian: Білилівка) is a village in the Berdychiv raion, Zhytomyr oblast in Ukraine. Its population is 2,193.

== History ==
On the eve of the war, there were over 1800 Jews living in the village. The Germans captured the town on 15 July 1941. On September 10, 1941, over 850 Jews were murdered by mobile SS units, aided by local police in a mass execution.
