= Kärnä =

Kärnä is a Finnish surname. Notable people with the surname include:

- Jarmo Kärnä (born 1958), Finnish long jumper
- Mikko Kärnä (born 1980), Finnish politician
- Sari Kärnä (born 1988), Finnish ice hockey player
