= Suvasvesi =

Lake in Finland

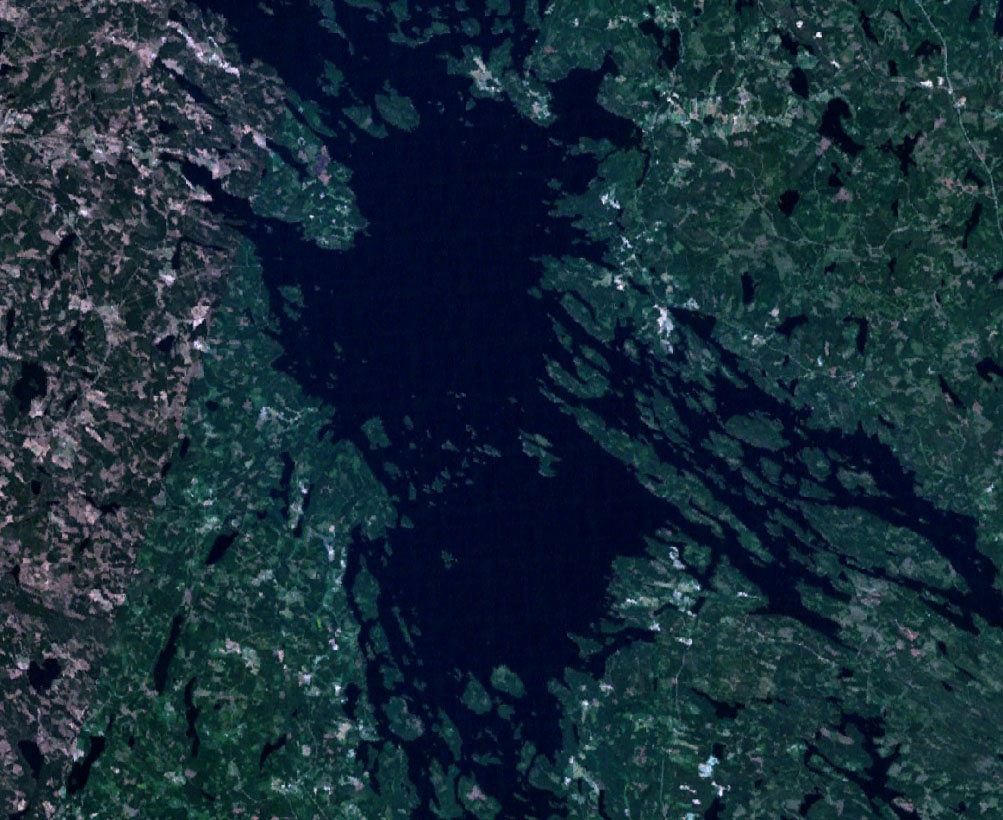
- Landsat 7 image

- Location within Finland

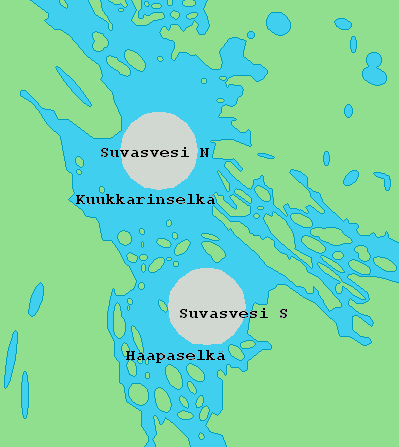
- with the impact structures in gray.
- Location: North Savo
- Coordinates: 62°39′N 028°12′E
- Type: Impact crater lake
- Basin countries: Finland
- Surface area: 233.58 km^{2} (90.19 sq mi)
- Max. depth: 89.0 m (292 ft)
- Surface elevation: 81.7 m (268 ft)
- Islands: 688

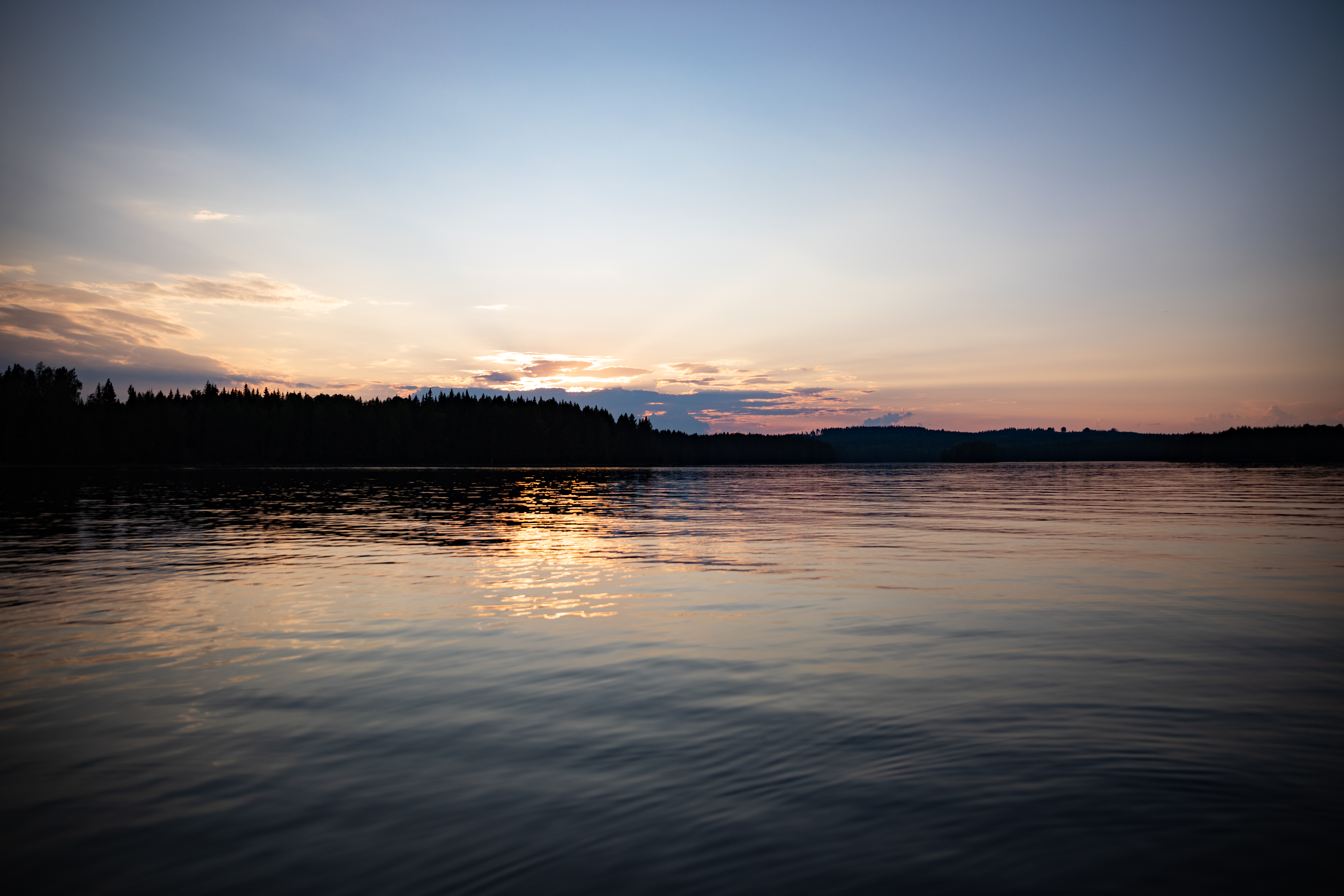
Sunset at lake Suvasvesi

Suvasvesi is a lake in Eastern Finland near the city of Kuopio. Suvasvesi consists of two circular open lakes, Kuukkarinselkä in north and Haapaselkä in south. The lakes are separated by a group of islands. The lake has 688 islands in total. The area of the lake is 234 square kilometres (90 sq mi) making it the 18th largest lake in Finland. Kuukkarinselkä is the third deepest lake in Finland measuring 89.0 metres (292.0 ft) in the deepest point.

In 2001, shatter cones were found in Kuukkarinselkä making it the 6th known impact crater in Finland. The crater, usually referred as Suvasvesi North crater, is located in the center of Kuukkarinselkä and measures about 3.5 kilometres (2.2 mi) in diameter. Its age is estimated to be about 85 Ma but the Earth Impact Database (EID) gives a broader span of less than 1000 Ma.

Haapaselkä resembles the northern counterpart and it was also suspected to be an impact crater. It has recently been confirmed and is usually referred as Suvasvesi South crater. It is similar in size, and the age of the crater is estimated to be older than 700 Ma (probably about 710–720 Ma) based on argon-argon dating of impact melt rocks found near the southeastern shore of Lake Haapaselkä but EID gives it as around 250 Ma.

== See also ==
- Impact craters in Finland
