= Iso-Naakkima =

Lake in Southern Savonia, Finland

- Location within Finland

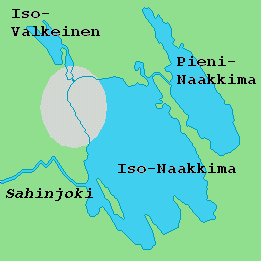
- Lake Iso-Naakkima with the impact structure area in grey.
- Location: Southern Savonia
- Coordinates: 62°11′N 27°9′E
- Primary outflows: Sahinjoki
- Basin countries: Finland
- Max. length: 4.9 km (3.0 mi)
- Max. width: 3.3 km (2.1 mi)
- Surface area: 11.14 km^{2} (4.30 sq mi)
- Surface elevation: 111.2 m (365 ft)

Iso-Naakkima is a lake in Southern Savonia, Finland, about 10 km south of the town of Pieksämäki. It is notable for having an eroded impact crater under the northwestern part of the lake. It is one of the oldest known, about 1200 million years old (900–1200 Ma, Mesoproterozoic). Of the known craters older than a billion years old, it is also one of the smallest being only 3 km in diameter.

At the time of the impact event, the continent of Baltica (modern northeastern Europe) was located near the equator. The crater is filled by recent (Quaternary) sediments and is not visible to the surface. Its existence was revealed by strikingly circular geophysical anomalies which are concentrated in a region 3 km in diameter; the actual remnant is about 2 km wide and 160 m deep. Its existence was later confirmed by drilling results. The discovery was made in 1989 and therefore Iso-Naakkima is the fourth known impact structure in Finland.

== See also ==
- Impact craters in Finland
