= Tvären =

Bay near Studsvik, Sweden

Coordinates: 58°46′N 17°25′E

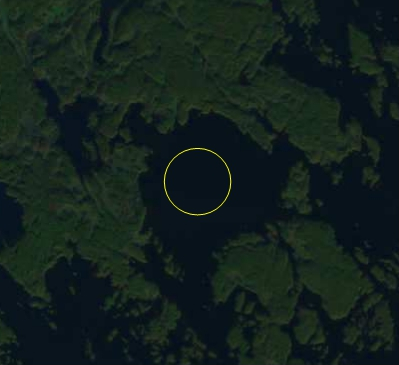
- Tvären Bay, Sweden, with Tvären impact structure indicated
- Location: Studsvik, Sweden

Impact crater structure
- Confidence: Confirmed
- Diameter: 2 kilometres (1.2 mi)
- Age: 455 Ma

Tvären is a circular bay close to Studsvik, Sweden.

Within the bay is an ancient buried impact crater about 2 kilometres (1.2 mi) in diameter. It was first identified using reflection seismology. The crater is estimated to be about 455 million years old (Late Ordovician).

Asteroid 7771 Tvären is named after the bay.
