= Lockne crater =

Meteorite crater in Sweden

Coordinates: 63°00′00″N 14°48′59″E

- Location: Östersund, Sweden

Impact crater structure
- Confidence: Confirmed
- Diameter: 7.5 km (4.7 mi)
- Age: 458 Ma

Lockne is a meteorite crater, located approximately 21 km (13 mi) south of the city of Östersund in northern Sweden. It has been suggested that it is a doublet with the nearby smaller Målingen Crater, 16 km (9.9 mi) apart. Computer simulations suggest that the asteroid that created the Lockne crater was some 600 metres (2,000 ft) in diameter, and the one that carved out Målingen crater was about 250 metres (820 ft) across.

It is 7.5 kilometres (4.7 mi) in diameter and the age is estimated, based on accompanying chitinozoan microfossils, to be 458 million years (Late Ordovician). The crater is exposed at the surface. Its fossils, typical of shallow marine environments, show it to be a marine target impact event.
