= Granby crater =

Impact crater in Östergötland, Sweden

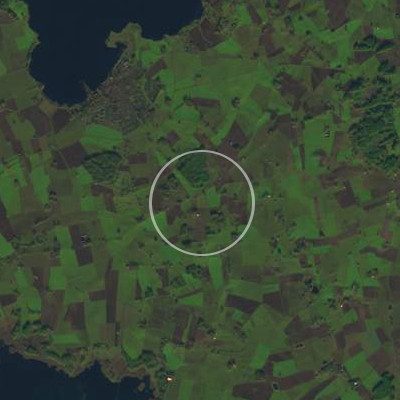
- Approximate extent of Granby crater

- Location within Sweden
- Location: Östergötland, Östergötland, Sweden; 58°25′N 14°56′E

Impact crater structure
- Confidence: Confirmed
- Diameter: 3 km (1.9 mi)
- Age: ~470 Ma; Middle Ordovician
- Exposed: No
- Drilled: Yes
- Bolide type: Ordovician meteor event?

Granby is an impact crater in Östergötland, Sweden, located to the southeast of Vadstena. It is estimated to have formed about 470 million years ago (Middle Ordovician). The crater is 3 kilometres (1.9 mi) in diameter and is not exposed at the surface.

== See also ==
- Impact craters of Sweden
