= Lumparn =

Bay in Åland, Finland

- Lumpari
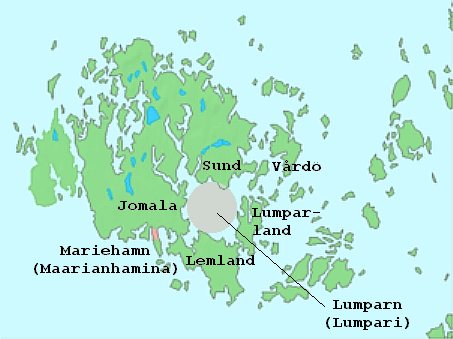
- Lumparn with the impact structure area in grey

- Location within Finland
- Location: Fasta Åland, Sund, Lumparland, Lemland & Jomala, Åland, Åland, Finland; 60°9′N 20°6′E

Impact crater structure
- Confidence: Confirmed
- Diameter: 9 km (5.6 mi)
- Age: ~1000 Ma; Proterozoic
- Exposed: No
- Drilled: Yes

Lumparn (Finnish: Lumpari) is a large bay devoid of islands in the main island of Åland, Finland, bordered by Sund to the north, Lumparland to the east, Lemland to the south and Jomala to the west.

== Description ==
Most of the bay fills a nine kilometer wide impact structure. The structure is estimated to be about 1000 million years old (Proterozoic). The depression was originally believed to be a rift. Kaj Himberg investigated shatter cones in the southwestern part of the bay, which at the time was only known as a cryptovolcanic structure. Himberg also took an interest to fossils around Lumparn while investigating shatter cones, and in the late 1880s documented the fossils of trilobites and conodonts, with the latter he believed to be a species of annelid rather than fish. Extraterrestrial origin was first proposed in 1979, but not until 1993 was the impact structure finally confirmed. Long shatter cones have been discovered in the southwestern part of the bay. The remains of the crater are filled with sediments. Between Pleistocene sediments and crushed rapakivi granite bedrock there is a layer of Paleozoic (Ordovician) limestones. This makes Lumparn one of the few places in Finland where fossils have been found.

The bay has also previously been referred to as Lumpari in some Finnish documents, though the Research Institute for the Languages of Finland does not list Lumpari as in current usage.

== Gallery ==
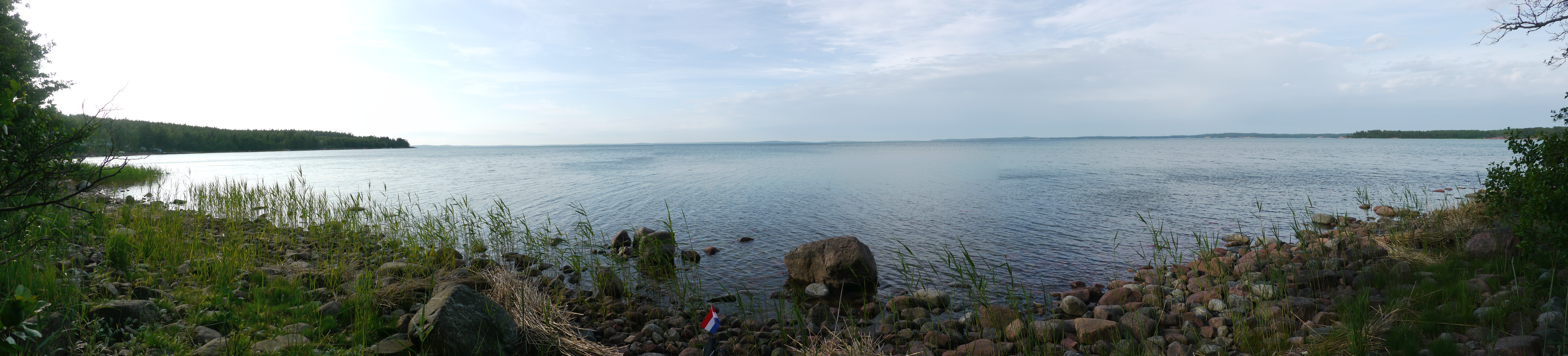
Panorama over Lumparn, seen from the south coast. On the horizon, a small part of Sund is just visible.

== See also ==
- Impact craters in Finland
