= Målingen Crater =

Asteroid impact crater in Sweden

Coordinates: 62°55′N 14°33′E

- Location: Östersund, Sweden

Impact crater structure
- Confidence: Confirmed
- Diameter: 1 km (0.62 mi)
- Age: 458 Ma

Målingen was confirmed as an impact crater in 2014. It is located near the city of Östersund in northern Sweden. It is "probable" that it formed simultaneously with the nearby Lockne crater. Computer simulations suggest the asteroid pieces that created the Lockne and Målingen craters were some 600 meters and 250 meters in diameter, respectively.

Målingen is 1 kilometre (0.62 mi) in diameter and its age is estimated, using chitinozoan microfossils, which were also found in Lockne, to be 458 million years (Late Ordovician).
