= Mien (lake) =

Lake in Sweden

Lake Mien
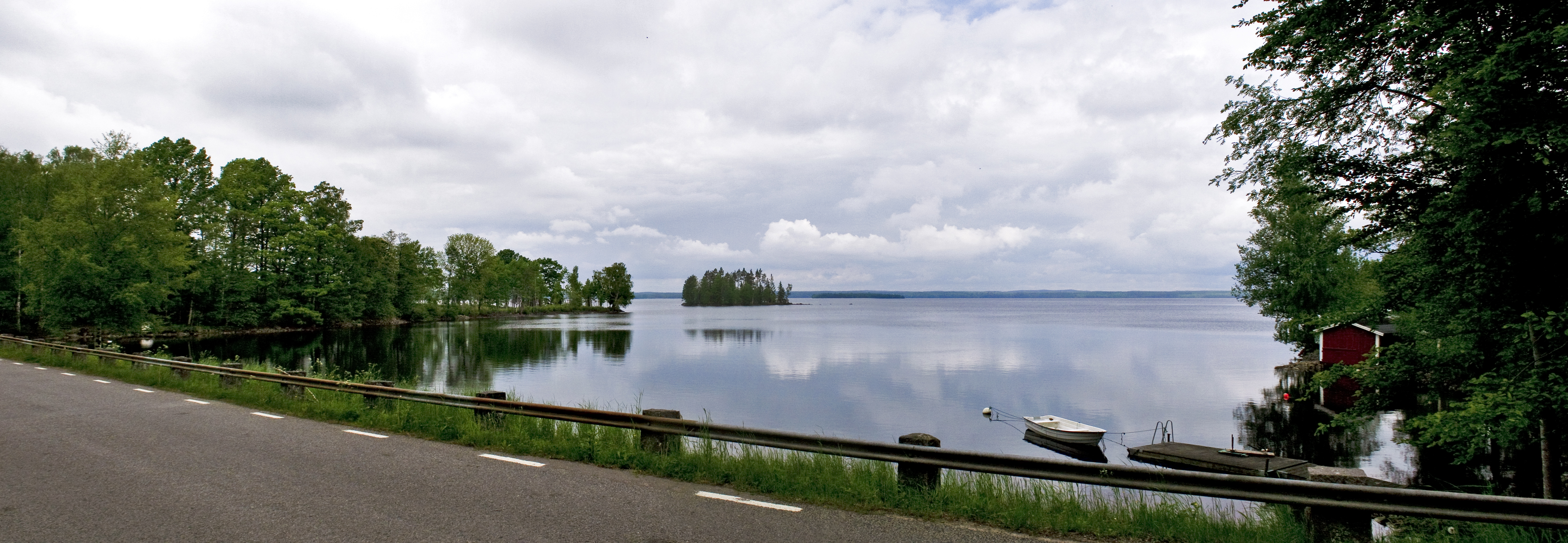

- Location within Kronoberg
- Location: Småland
- Coordinates: 56°25′N 14°52′E
- Type: Impact crater lake
- Primary inflows: Dreván
- Primary outflows: Mieån
- Basin countries: Sweden
- Max. length: 6.0 km (3.7 mi)
- Max. width: 5.7 km (3.5 mi)
- Surface area: 19.9 km^{2} (7.7 mi^{2})
- Surface elevation: 90 m (300 ft)
- Islands: 14 (Ramsö, Kidö)

Mien is a lake in southern Sweden, 12 km (7.5 mi) southwest of the town of Tingsryd. The lake lies within a meteorite crater.

Lake Mien in Sweden

The eroded crater is marked by a 5.5 km (3.4 mi) diameter circular lake (Lake Mien). The original crater rim is estimated to have been about 9 km (5.6 mi) in diameter before erosion. Its age is estimated to be 121.0 ± 2.3 million years (Early Cretaceous).
