= Lake Lappajärvi =

Impact crater lake in Finland

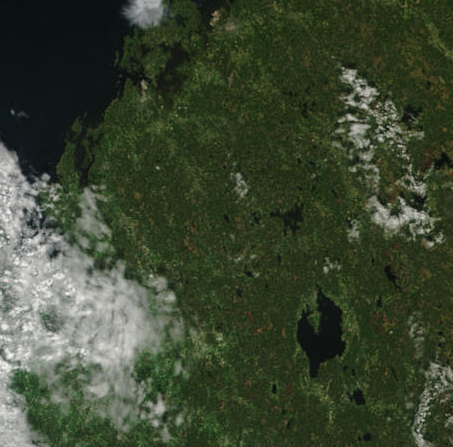
- Lappajärvi is the largest lake near the lower right corner.

- Location within Finland
- Location: Lappajärvi, Finland
- Coordinates: 63°12′N 023°42′E
- Type: Impact crater lake
- Primary outflows: Ähtävänjoki
- Basin countries: Finland
- Surface area: 145.49 km^{2} (56.17 sq mi)
- Max. depth: 36 m (118 ft)
- Surface elevation: 69.5 m (228 ft)
- Islands: 56 (Kärnä)

Lappajärvi is a lake in Finland, in the municipalities of Lappajärvi, Alajärvi and Vimpeli. It is formed in a 23 km (14 mi) wide, partly eroded meteorite impact crater. The lake is part of Ähtävänjoki (Swedish: Esse å) basin together with Lake Evijärvi that is located downstream (north) of it.

The Lappajärvi impact structure is estimated to be 77.85 ± 0.78 million years old (Campanian age of the Late Cretaceous time period). Experts working on Finland's Onkalo spent nuclear fuel repository project have studied Lake Lappajärvi to help them project how Finnish landscapes might look one million years in the future and beyond.

An island in the middle of the lake, Kärnänsaari (Kärnä Island), gives the name to the black impact melt rock (impactite) found there, locally called Kärnäiitti.

Nearby towns include Lappajärvi and Vimpeli and the nearest major city is Seinäjoki.

In September 2023, UNESCO accepted the Lappajärvi area's "Impact Crater Lake" Geopark application as one of the possible recipients of Geopark status for 2024.

== Impact crater ==
Lappajärvi is the largest or second-largest meteorite crater in Finland, and it is also the youngest and the first meteorite crater discovered in Finland. The diameter of the crater, which was formed in Lappajärvi, was approximately 22-23 kilometers, with a depth of 750 meters. It was caused by an asteroid estimated to be about 1.6 kilometers in size, around 77.85 ± 0.78 million years ago. According to current estimates, it is believed to have been formed during the intensified meteorite and asteroid bombardment in the Late Cretaceous epoch. The asteroid is thought to have been a common H-type chondrite.

The cooling of the bedrock is estimated to have taken place over a period ranging from one hundred thousand to one million years. In a study from 2025, researchers proved that microbial activity has been ongoing in the fractures and vugs of the impact melt rocks, in the vaning stages of the hydrothermal activity (at 47 degrees C) a couple of million years after the impact

Below the Kärnänsaari island in the middle of the lake, there is impactite known as kärnäite. Kärnänsaari has been suspected to be the central uplift of the impact crater, although it could also be a mere erosional remnant shaped by glacial activity. The southeastern edge of the crater is surrounded by an elevated rim, now known as Lakeaharju and Pyhävuori. Typical rocks found in meteorite craters, such as breccia and suevite, as well as impact diamonds and minerals like coesite, have been discovered in Lappajärvi. The shattered bedrock resulting from the meteorite impact has created favorable groundwater areas in Lappajärvi.

Iso-Räyrinki Lake in Alajärvi has been suggested as a secondary crater of the Lappajärvi meteorite, thought to have been formed by a moon orbiting the Lappajärvi meteorite.

=== Discovery ===
The research history of Lappajärvi is considered to have started in 1858 when Henrik Holmberg mentioned in his book "Materialier till Finlands geognosi" a volcanic rock found in Lappajärvi. In 1916, geologist Eero Mäkinen analyzed the rock and identified it as dacite, a type of lava rock. After his studies on Lake Yanisyarvi in Karelia in 1920, geologist Pentti Eskola became convinced that Lappajärvi was also a volcanic lake. In the summer of 1926, Eskola visited Lappajärvi and confirmed that the kärnäite rock was volcanic in origin. Lappajärvi was long believed to be the remnant of an ancient volcano, and as late as 1964, Professor Ahti Simonen wrote about the lake's ancient volcanic activity.

In the spring of 1967, after studying the Nördlinger Ries crater in Germany, Professor Thure Georg Sahama began to suspect that Lappajärvi was also a meteorite crater and suggested that Martti Lehtinen investigate it. In 1967, Swedish researcher Nils-Bertil Svensson observed that quartz in kärnäite was fragmented in the same way as in other craters on Earth. Svensson's findings were published in Nature in February 1968. In 1967, Martti Lehtinen started his investigations of the crater and discovered suevite in the Hietakangas gravel pits in July 1967. In the summer of 1968, he found coesite in Lappajärvi. His licentiate thesis on the research was completed the following year. In 1976, Lehtinen published an English-language doctoral dissertation on the meteorite theory, which included evidence of quartz transformations in certain rock samples that could not have resulted from volcanic activity. The dissertation is considered the final confirmation of the meteorite theory. Gravity measurements conducted in the same year also supported the meteorite theory, as a gravitational anomaly was detected within a 17-kilometer diameter area.

In 1980, German researchers Elmar Jessberger and Uwe Reimold used the argon–argon dating method to determine the age of the crater to be approximately 77.3 million years.

From 1988 to 1990, the Geological Survey of Finland conducted drilling studies, with the first one reaching a depth of 217.75 meters in Härkäniemi, where kärnäite was found to extend from the surface to the depth of 145 m, followed by a suevite layer and a breccia layer. The second drilling reached a depth of 165.75 meters in Pokela, Vimpeli. The fourth drilling reached a depth of 275 meters in the intermediate island between Kärnänsaari and Matalasaari, but no kärnäite was found.

In 1992, paleomagnetic methods estimated the age of the crater to be around 195 million years. In 1997, small impact diamonds were discovered in suevite boulders from Lappajärvi. In 2001, uranium-lead dating by the Geological Survey of Finland estimated the age of the crater to be around 73.3 million years, with a margin of error of five million years, confirming that Lappajärvi was formed during the Late Cretaceous epoch. In a study published in 2013, argon–argon dating yielded an age of 76.2 million years for the crater. The study also revealed that some minerals were approximately one million years younger, suggesting that the cooling of the crater took place over a period ranging from one hundred thousand to one million years. In the summer of 2018, researchers proposed an age of 77.8 million years based on uranium-lead dating. After peer review, the age was revised to approximately 77.85 (± 0.78) million years.

== Gallery ==
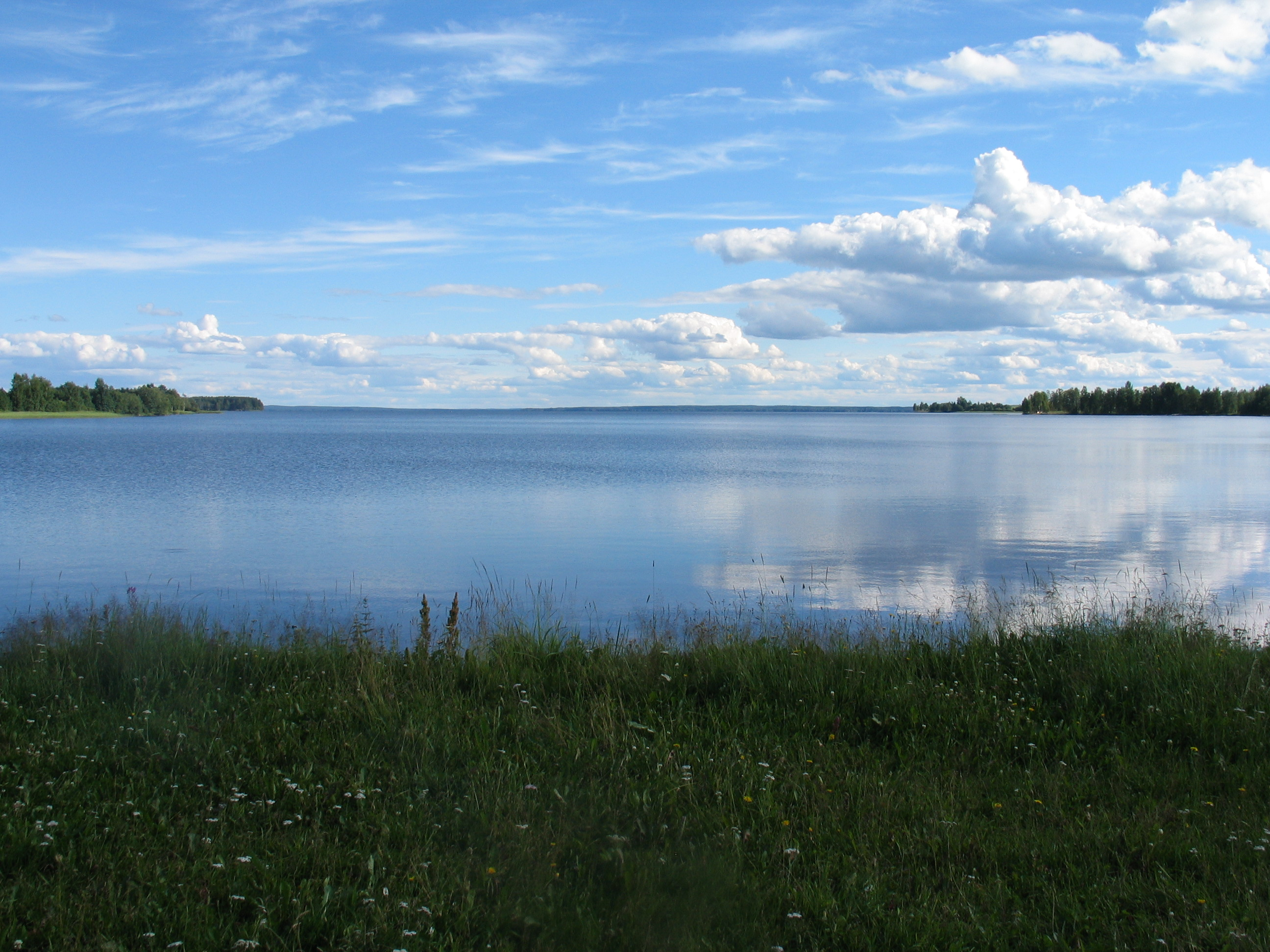
Lake Lappajärvi

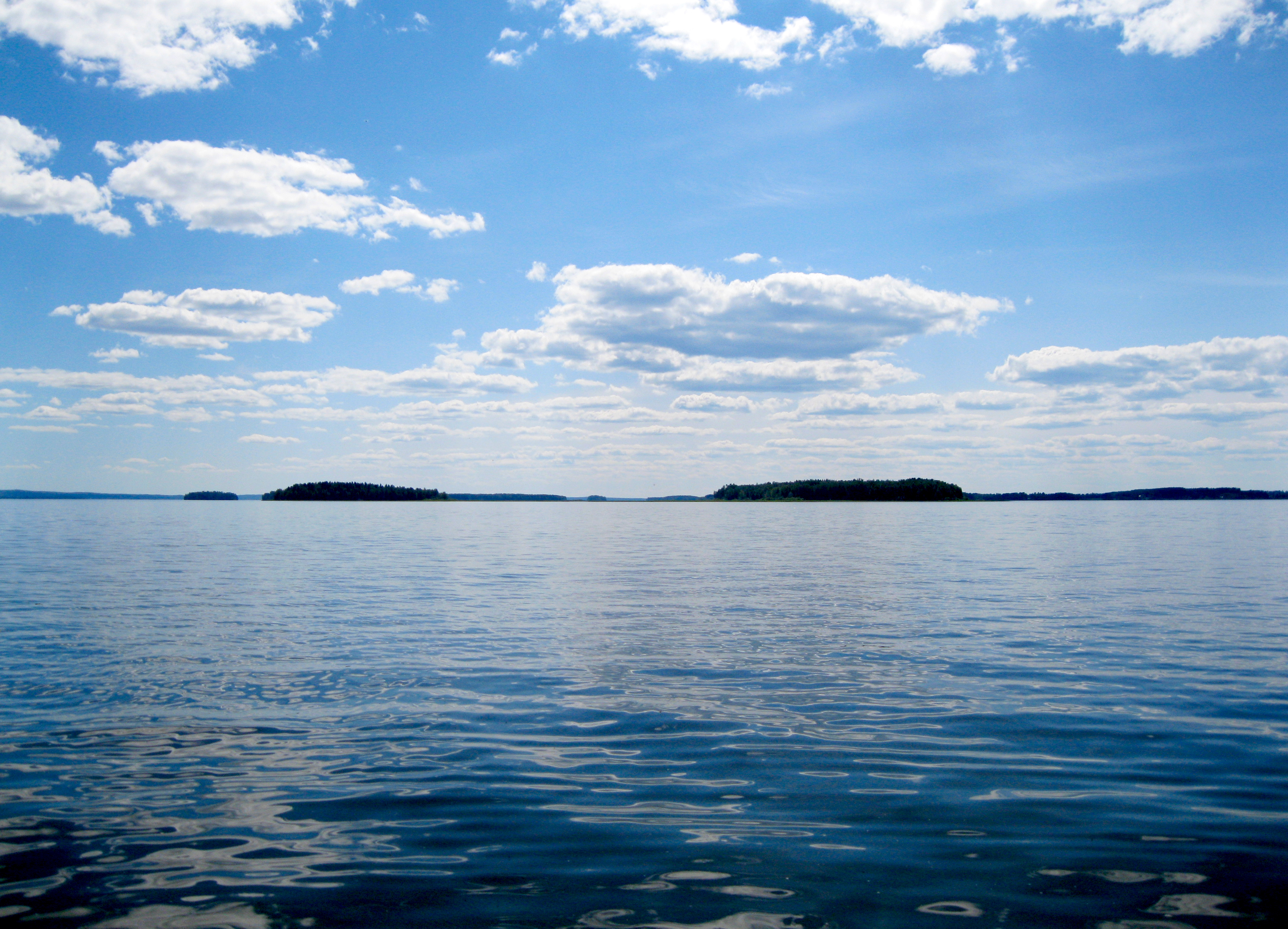
Lake Lappajärvi

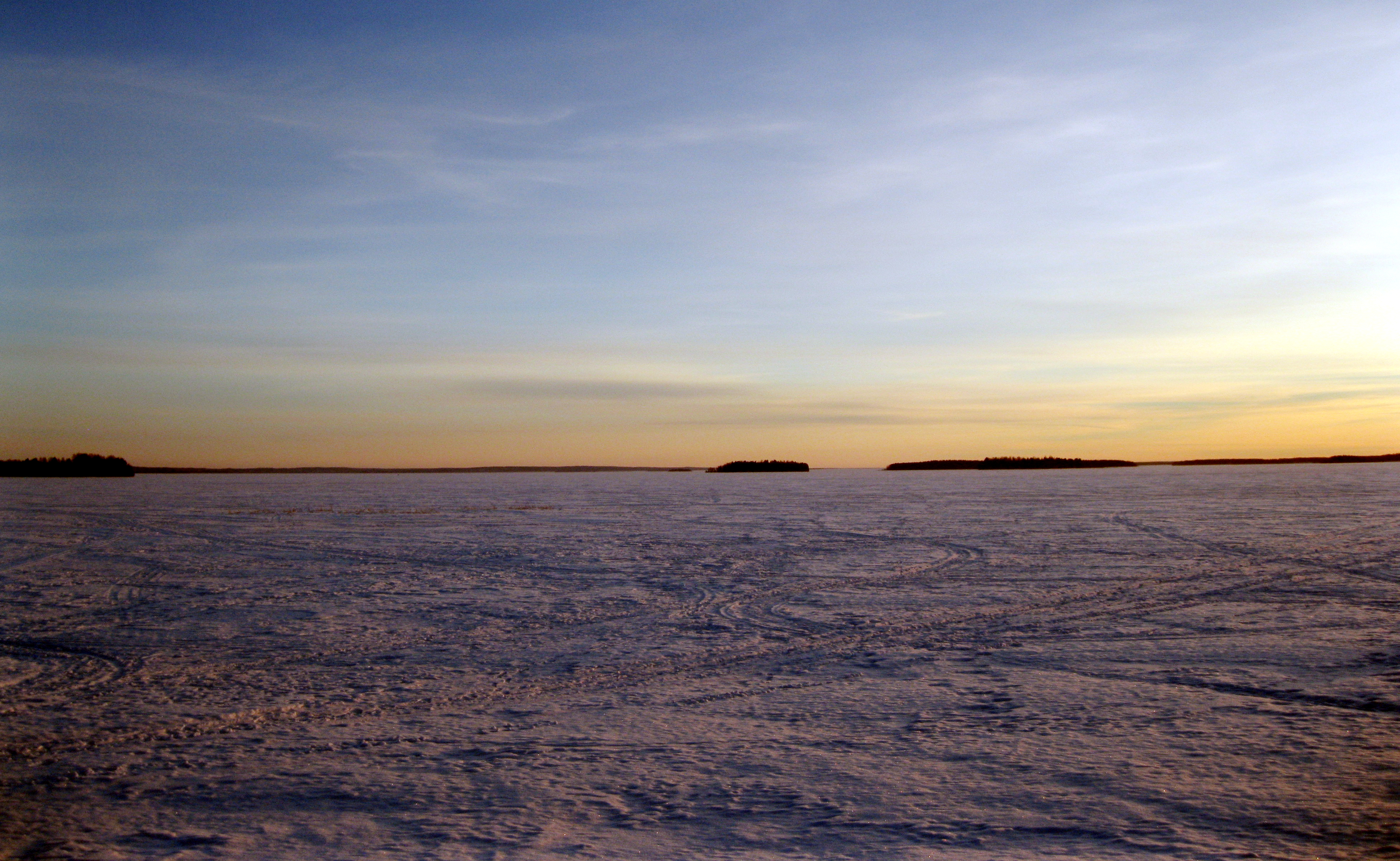
Frozen in winter

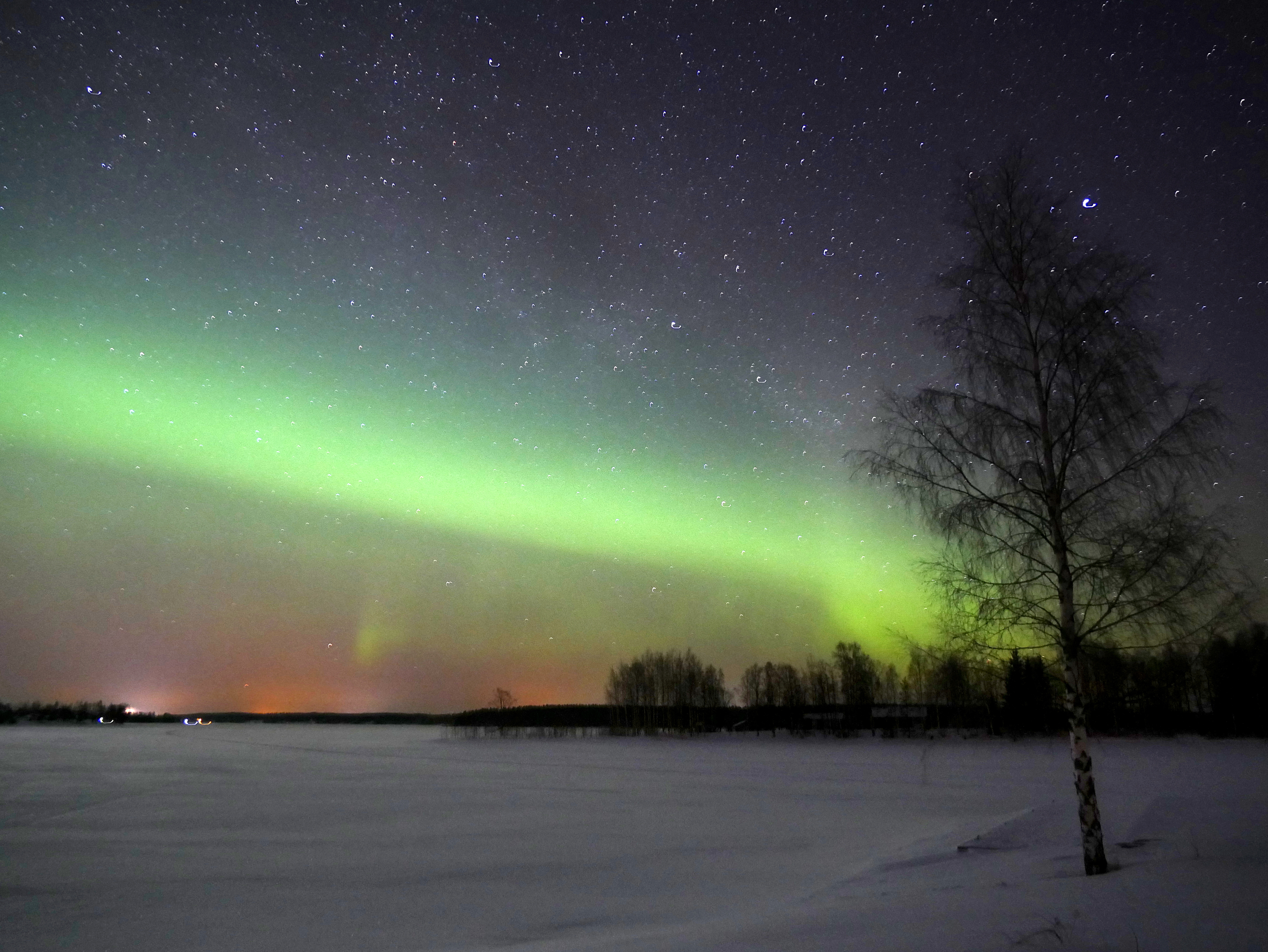
Winter with northern lights

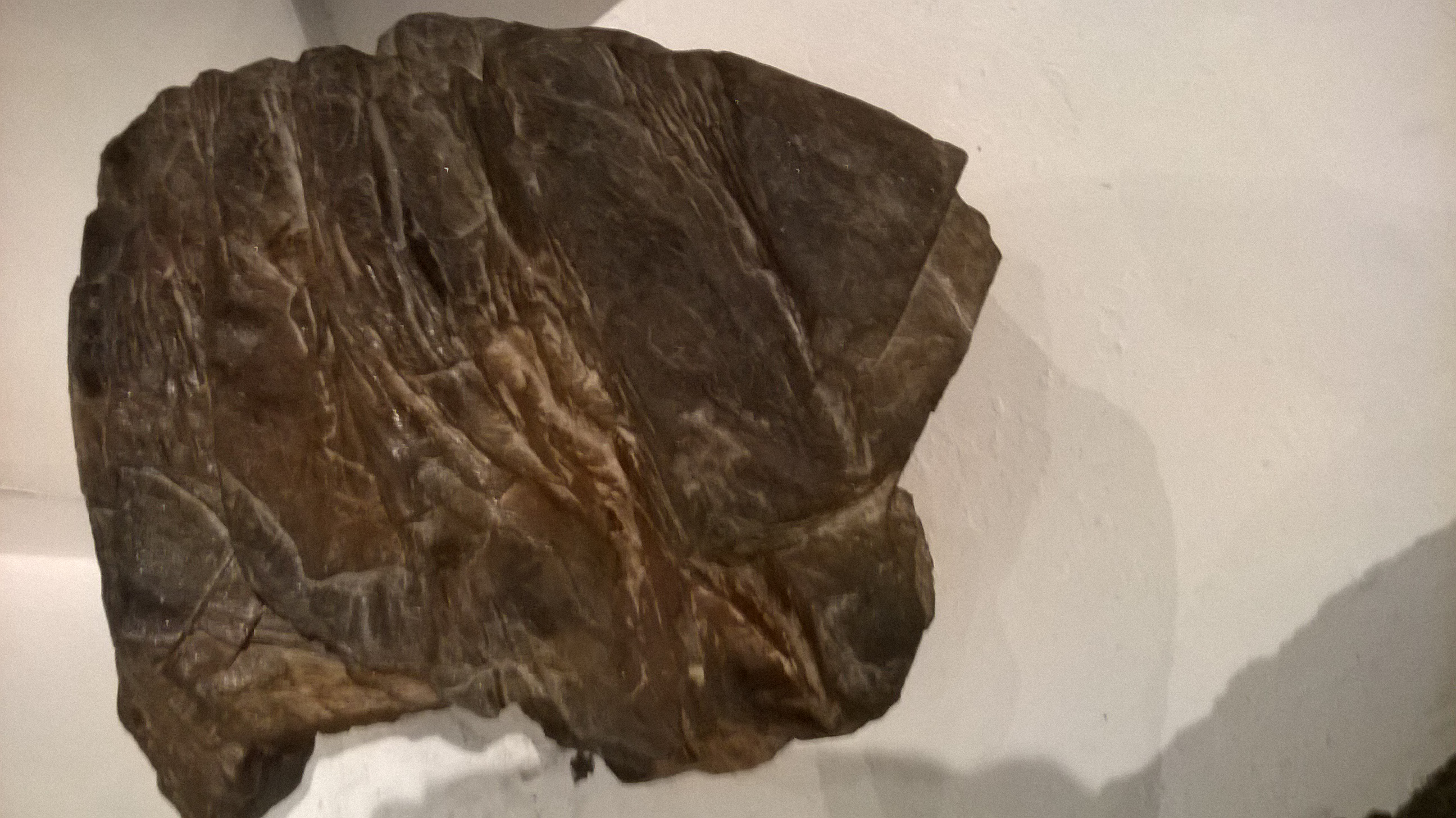
Lappajärvi impactite

== See also ==
- Impact craters in Finland
