= Saarijärvi crater =

Crater in Taivalkoski, Northern Ostrobothnia, Finland

Saarijärvi
- Location within Finland
- Location: Northern Ostrobothnia
- Coordinates: 65°17′N 28°23′E
- Basin countries: Finland

Saarijärvi is an impact structure mostly covered by a small lake by the same name. It is located about 40 km south from the town of Taivalkoski, Northern Ostrobothnia, Finland.

The impact origin of the structure was confirmed in 1997 when poorly developed planar deformation features (PDFs) in quartz grains were found in drill-core samples obtained from the bottom of the structure by a mining company while searching for diamonds in the region. Later amateur geologist Jarmo Moilanen also discovered shatter cones within the impact structure. Saarijärvi is the only currently accepted impact structure in the Fennoscandian Shield formed in Archean granitoid basement complex.

Most of the impact structure is filled by a sedimentary deposit, reaching a thickness of about 156 m in the center. It has a diameter of about 1.5 km, but shatter cones have been discovered in an area of about 2.2 km in diameter. The structure's age has not been determined, but the oldest sediments from the drill-core are from the Ediacaran period, i.e. about 600 Ma (million years) old. The upper part of the sedimentary crater-fill sequence also includes Cambrian microfossils. It is currently unclear whether or not at least some of the lowermost sediments are actually pre-impact in origin, while the upper part of the sequence may have been deposited after the impact. In any case it seems certain that the impact structure is younger than 1980 Ma (early Proterozoic), which is the age of the youngest metadolerite dikes in the region, apparently truncated by the Saarijärvi structure. Preliminary paleomagnetic measurements suggest an age of 1.2 Ga or 2.1 Ga (thousand million years), but these values are probably insignificant since the structure has been modified by tectonic processes. The cross-section of the structure is somewhat asymmetric with a deeper and steeper southern side compared to the northern one, which suggests tectonic modification rather than an oblique impact. An elongated island in the center of the structure also implies significant post-impact tectonic modification of the structure. Electromagnetic anomalies show that the Saarijärvi structure is slightly polygonal rather than actually circular. This is not uncommon for impact structures, and implies structural control (by pre-existing dominating fracture orientations in the target rock) during crater formation, although post-impact tectonic modification may also play a role.

== See also ==
- Impact craters in Finland
