= Savonranta =

Former municipality of Finland, now part of Savonlinna

Coordinates: 62°10′25″N 029°12′25″E

Coat of arms of Savonranta

Location of Savonranta in Finland

Savonranta is a former municipality of Finland. It became part of Savonlinna in early 2009.

It was located in the province of Eastern Finland and was part of the South Savo region. The municipality had a population of 1,155 (2009) and covered an area of 568.59 km² of which 182.55 km² was water. The population density was 3.3 inhabitants per km².

The municipality was unilingually Finnish.

Kolovesi National Park, home of the Saimaa Ringed Seals – one of the most endangered seals in the world, was located in Savonranta and its neighbouring municipalities Enonkoski and Heinävesi.

== Notable residents ==
- Aino Kuusinen (1886-1970) - Communist politician and wife of Otto Wille Kuusinen
- Toivo Turtiainen (1883-1920) - Politician and Member of Parliament (1919-1920)

== See also ==
- Orivirran saarto
