= Crater illusion =

Optical illusion

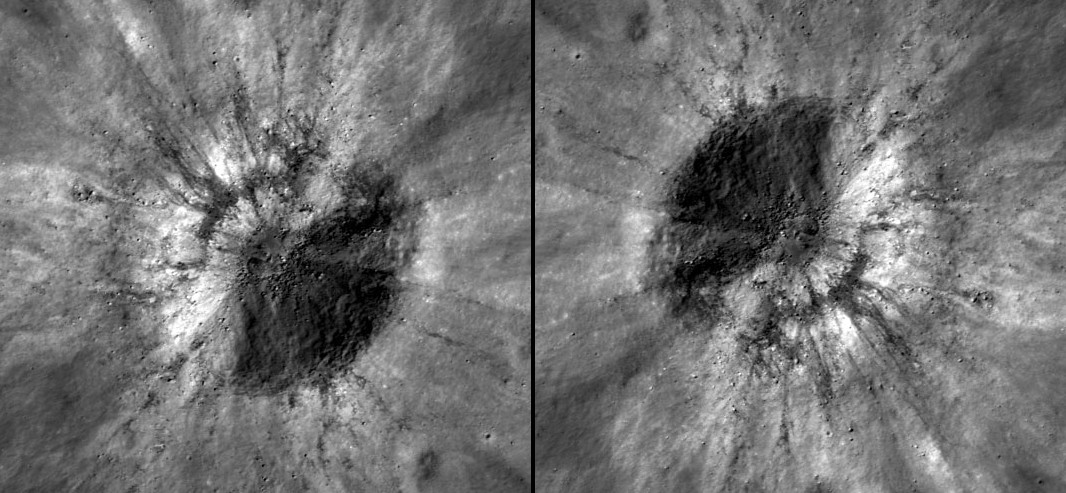
A geological feature that may appear to the view as a dome or mountain (left) can be read correctly as a crater (right) when the image is rotated

In astronomical imaging and Earth imaging, the crater illusion, also known as the dome illusion or crater/dome illusion, is an optical illusion which causes impact craters and other depressions to appear raised as domes or mountains. It is believed to be caused by being accustomed to seeing light from overhead. When some images are taken from orbit, the light from the sun is nearly horizontal. This is the only time shadows are seen. The brain is tricked into thinking that the interior of the crater is above the surrounding terrain instead of below it.

== Gallery ==
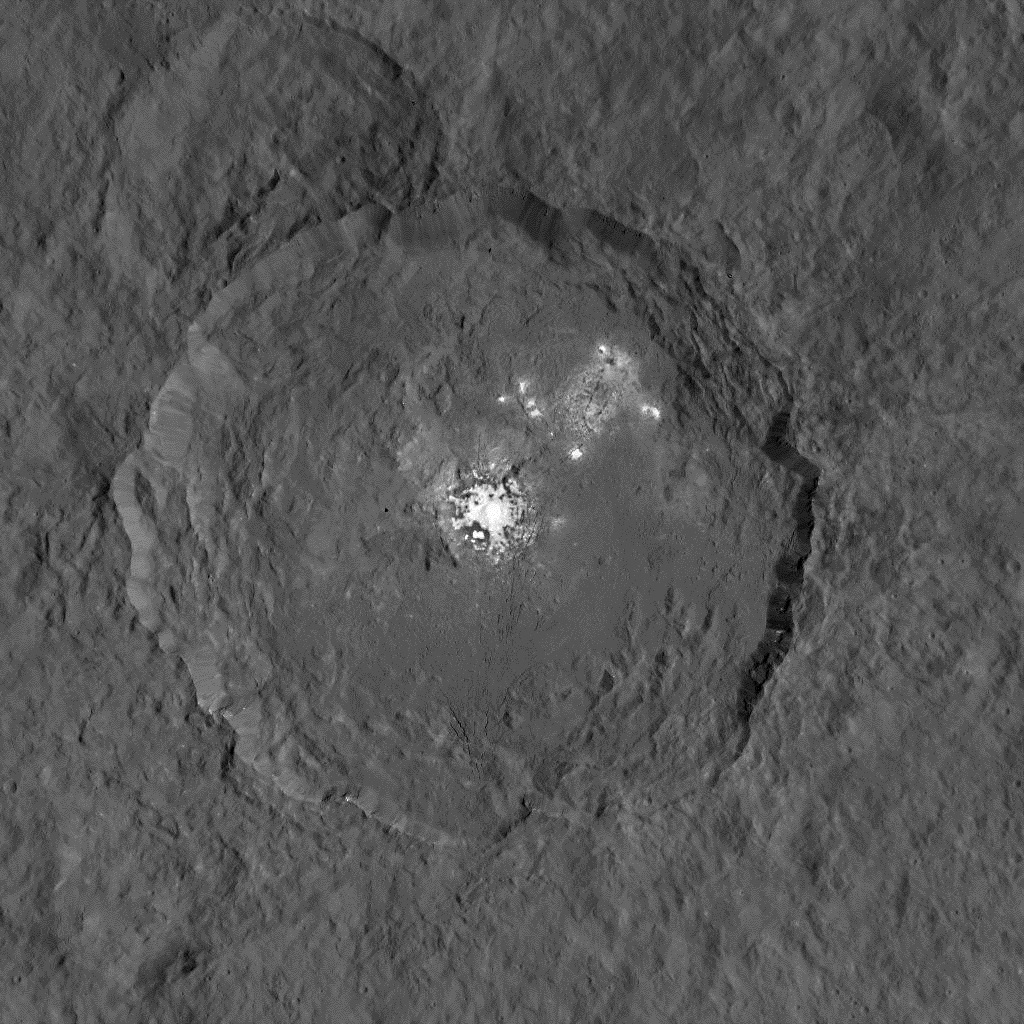
Occator on dwarf planet Ceres, showing the illusion...

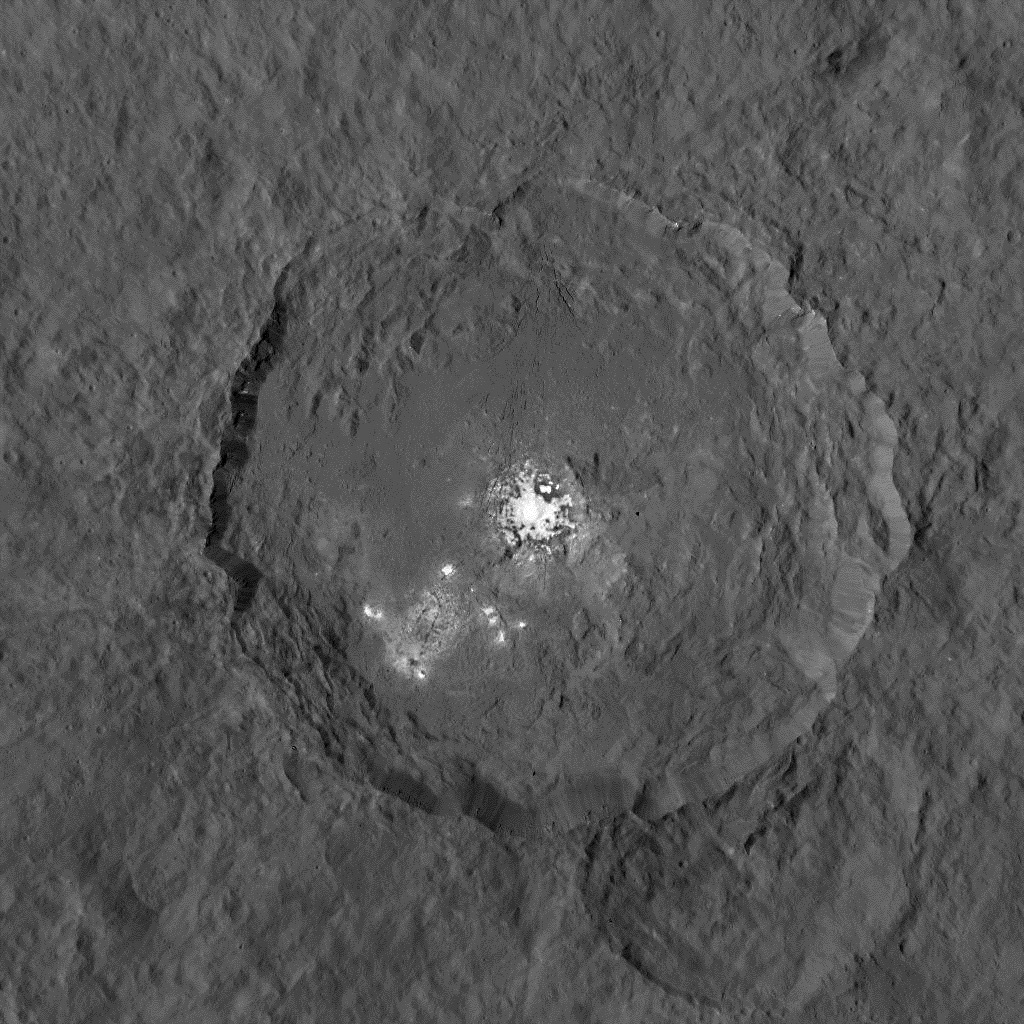
...and rotated 180 degrees to eliminate the illusion

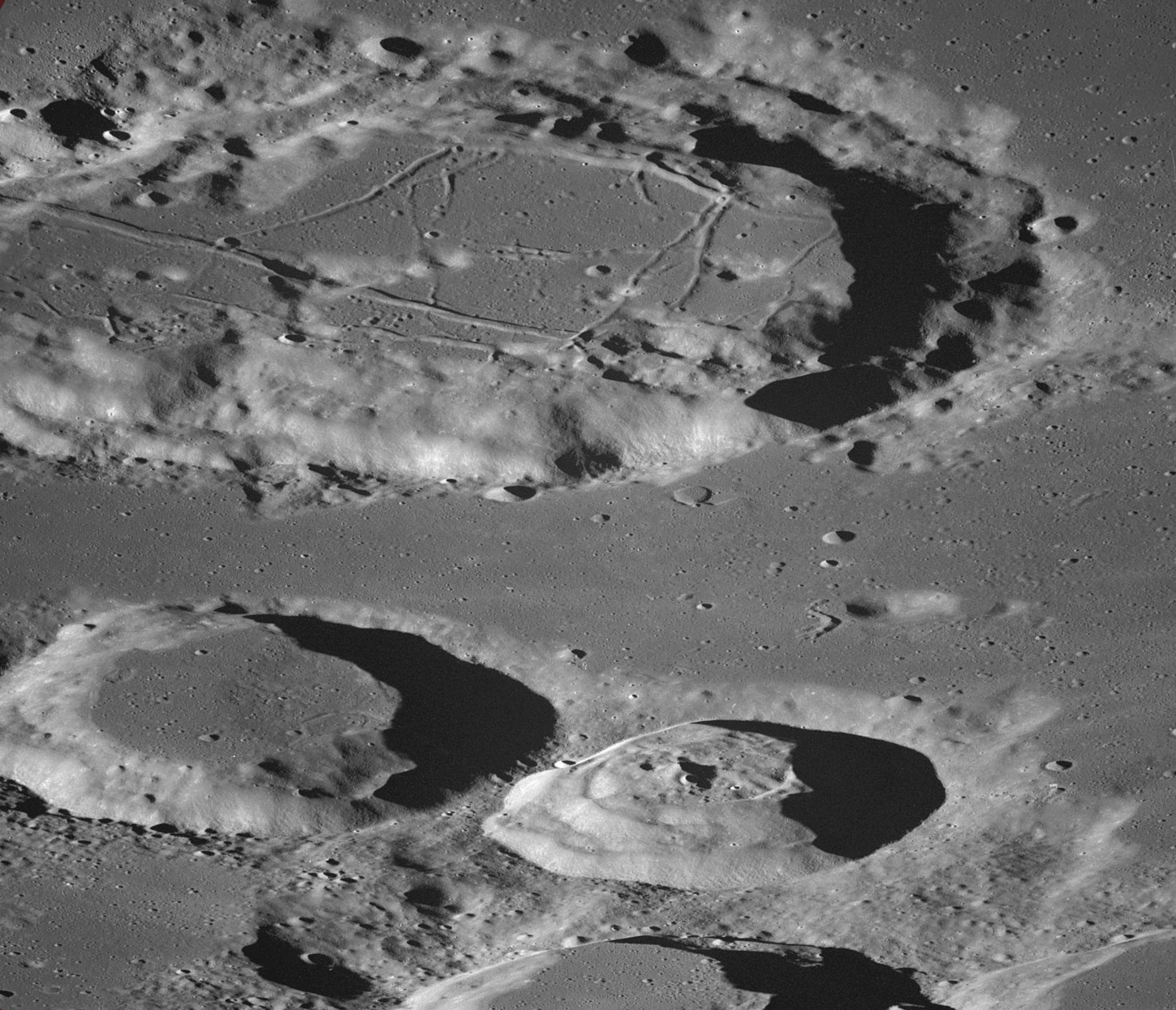
The Moon's crater Goclenius, rotated to show the illusion...

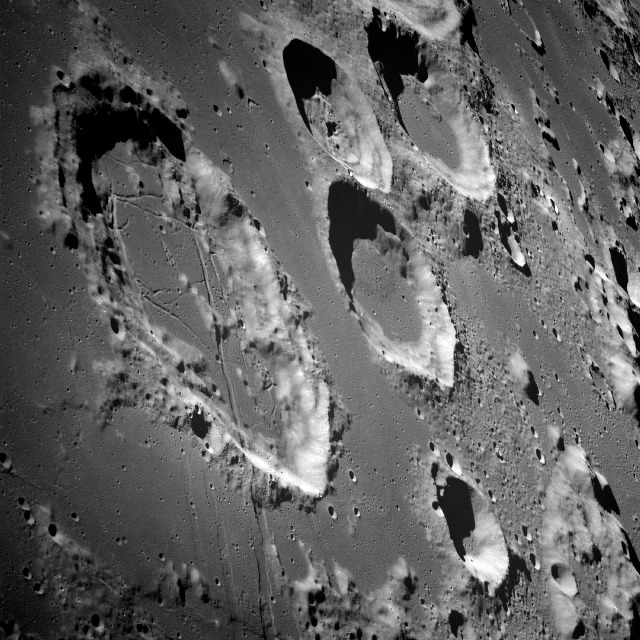
...and the original without the illusion

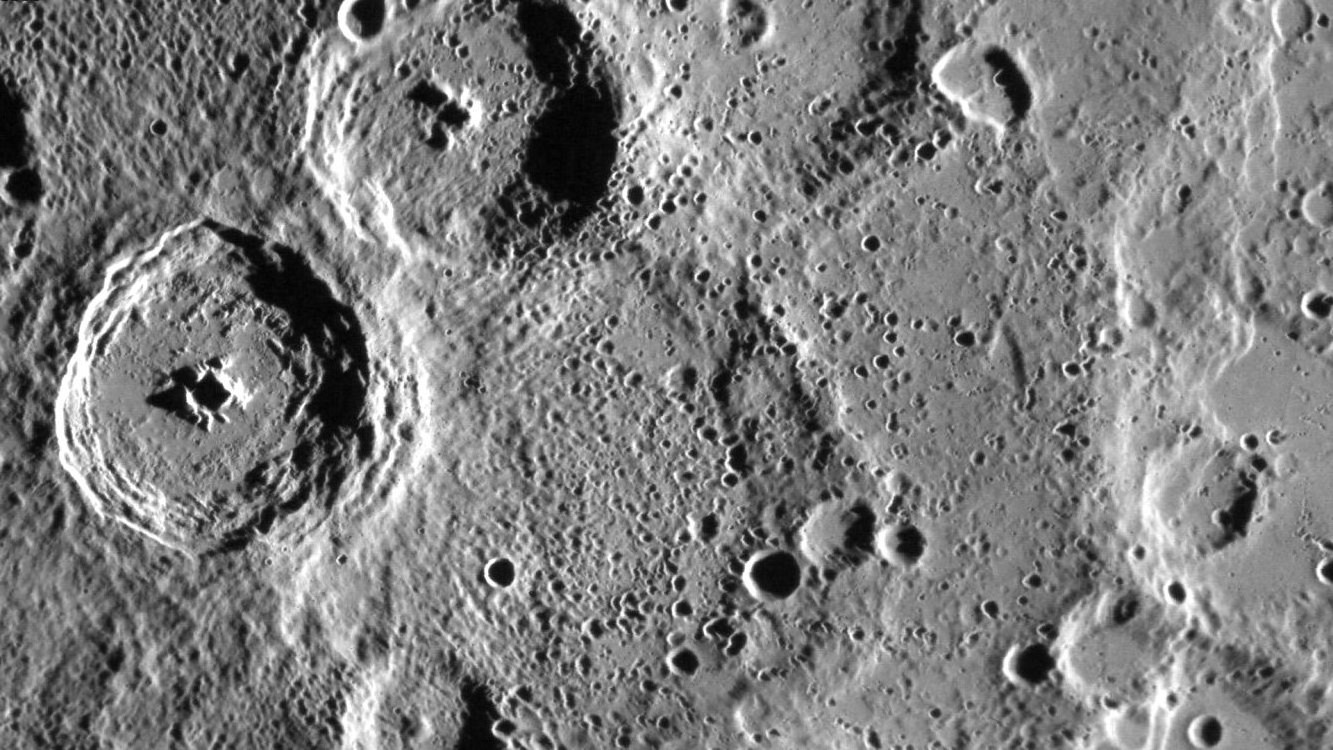
Mercury's Spitteler and Holberg craters showing the illusion...

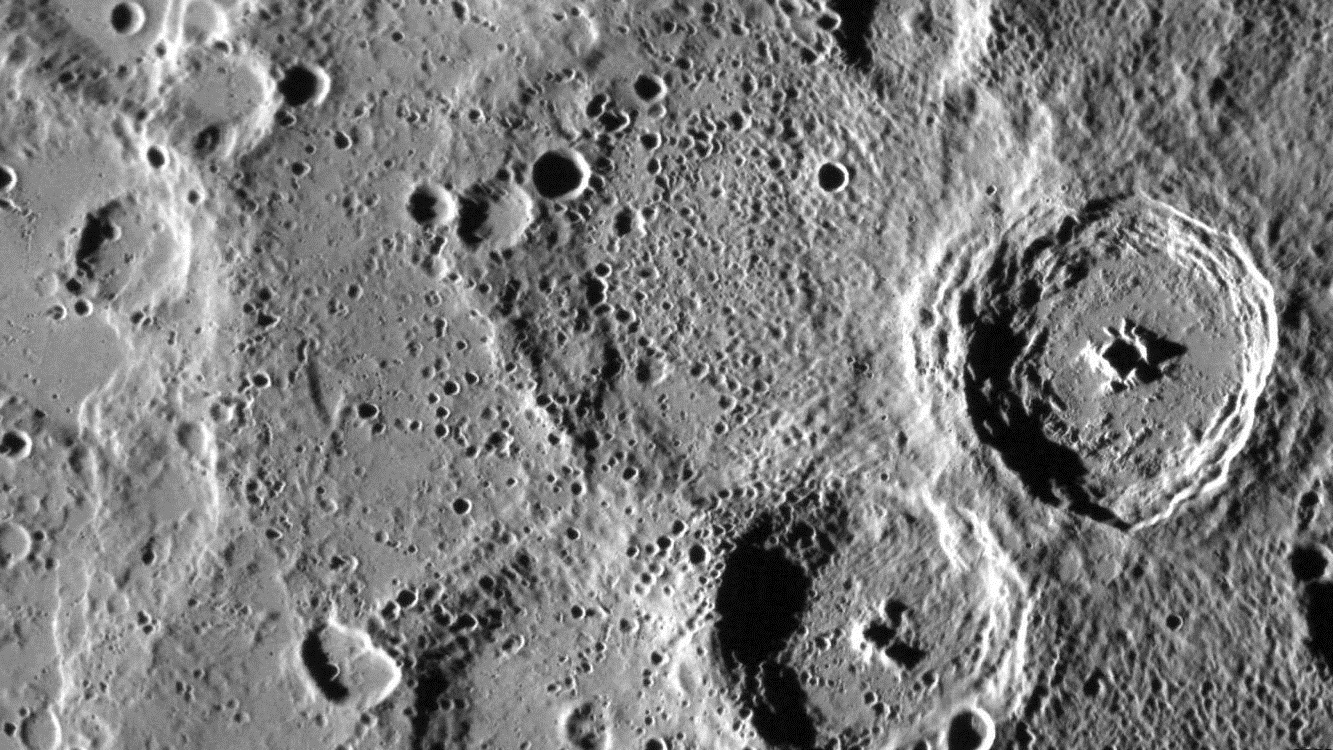
...and rotated to attempt to remove it

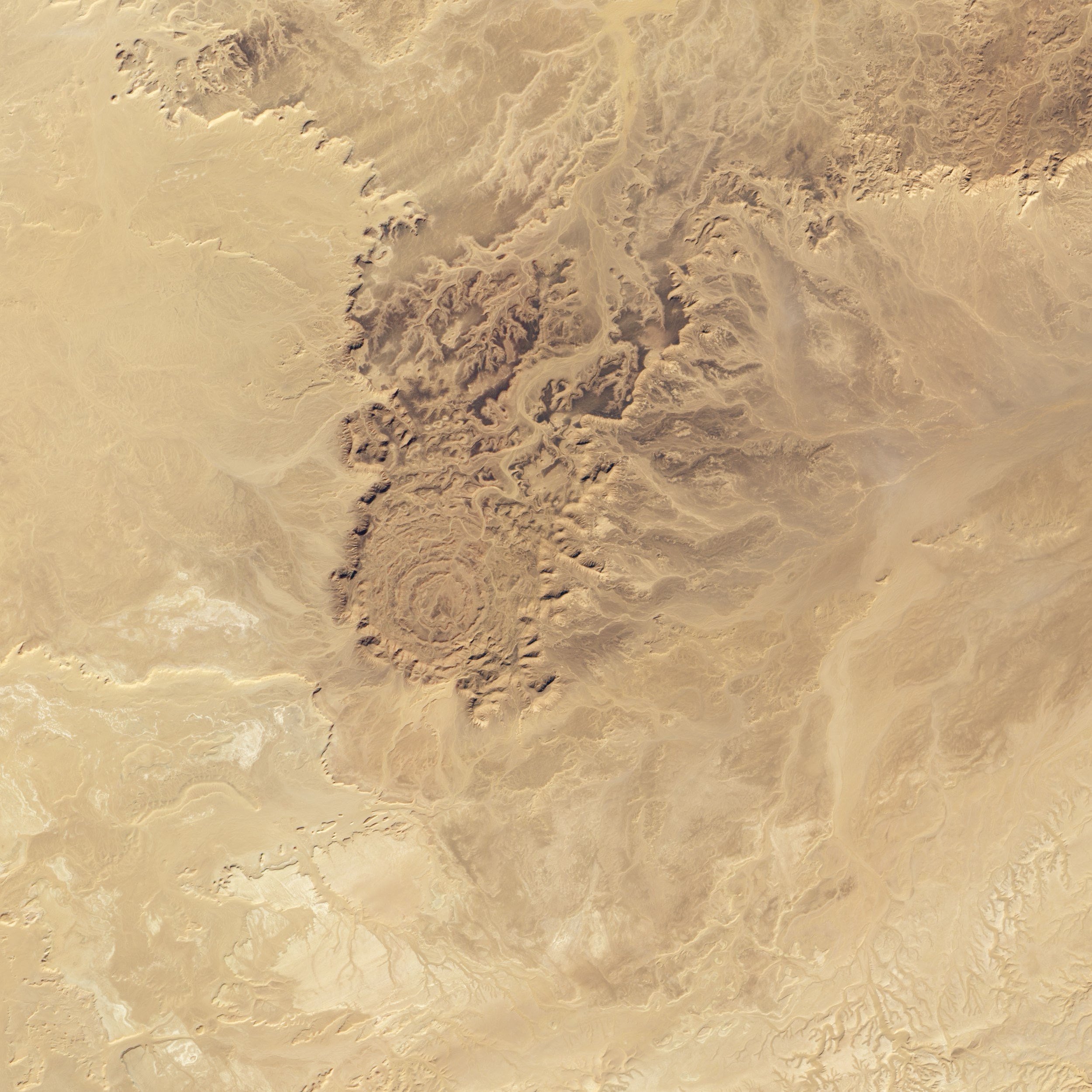
The Tin Bider crater in Algeria, producing the reverse illusion. The crater rises above the surrounding terrain, however the position of the sun makes it appear to be below it.

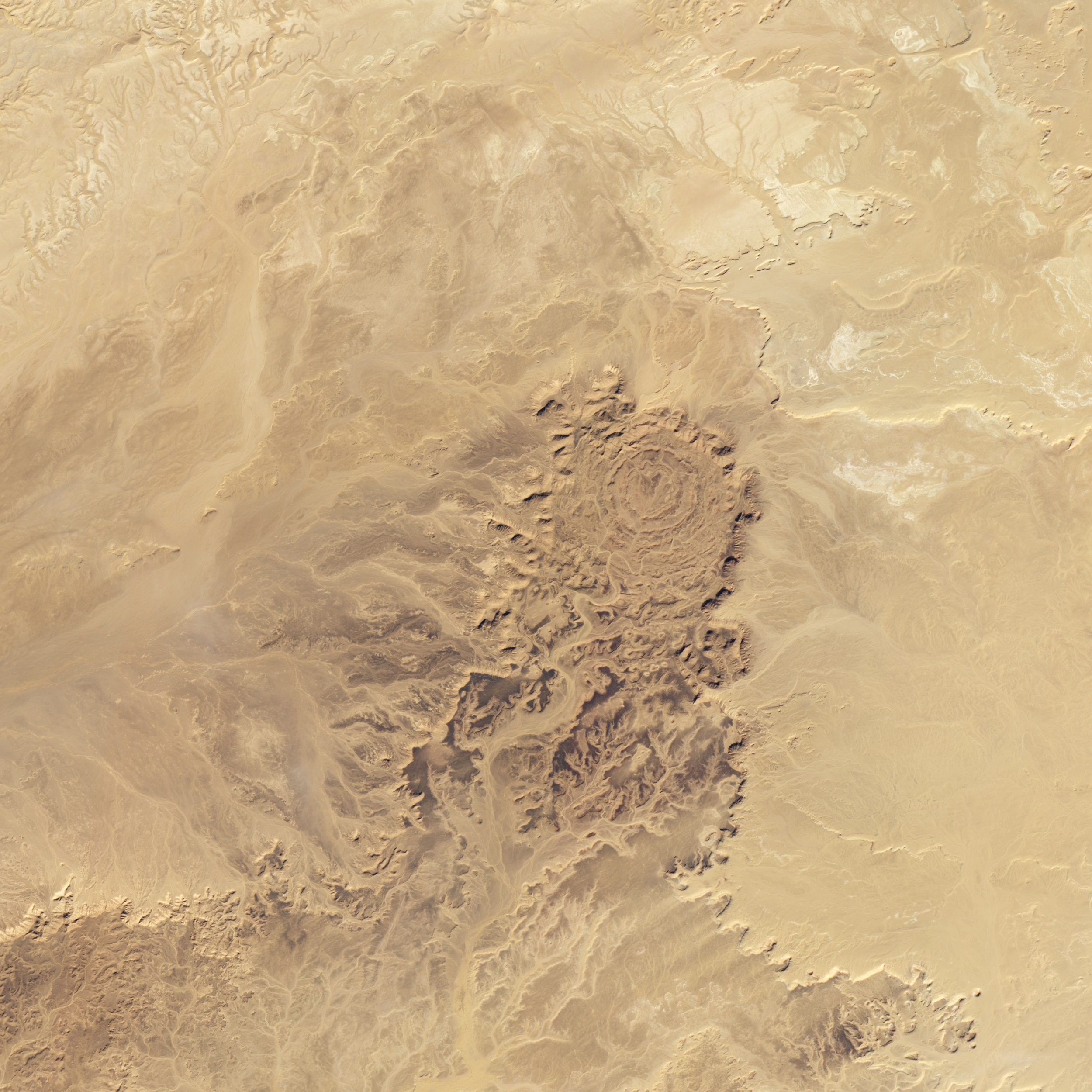
...and rotated to remove the illusion
