= List of impact structures in Africa =

World map in equirectangular projection of the impact structures on the Earth Impact Database as of November 2017 (in the SVG file, hover over a structure to show its details)

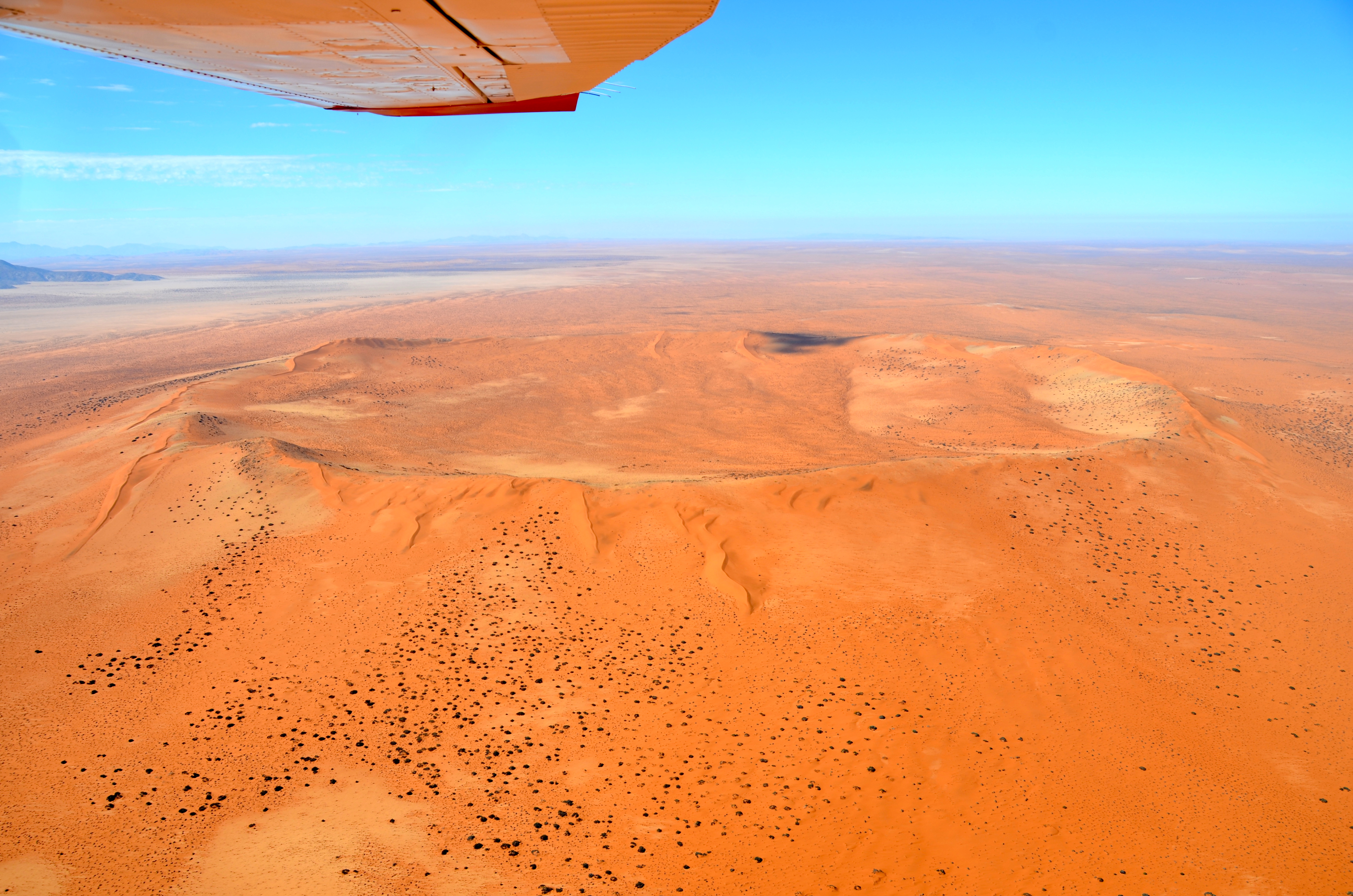
Aerial view of Roter Kamm crater (2017)

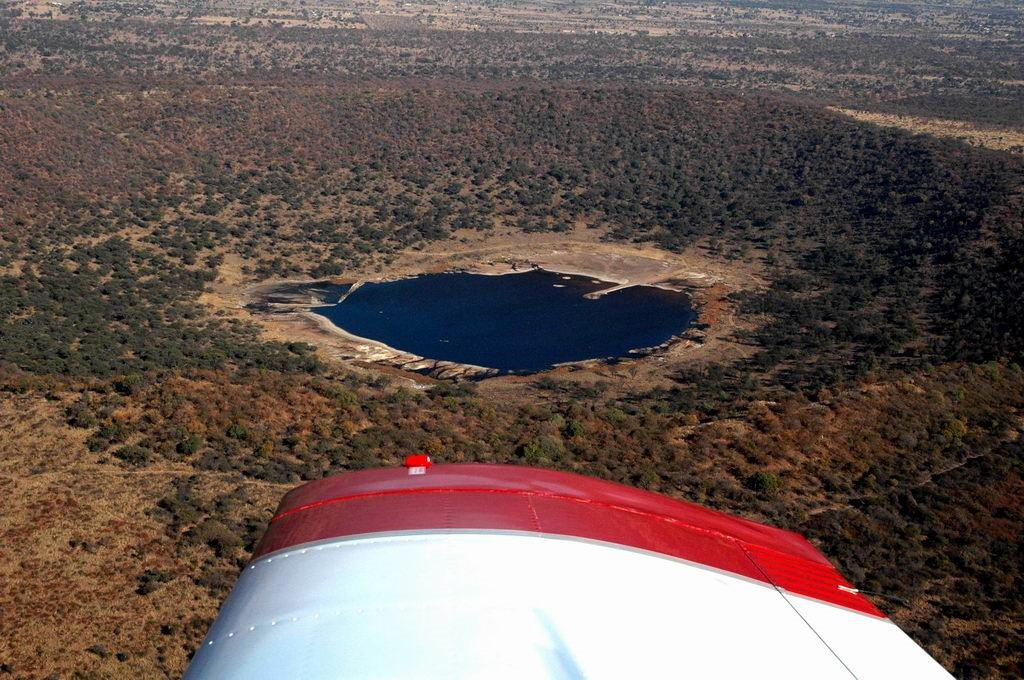
Bird's eye view of Tswaing Crater (2008)

== Confirmed impact structures ==
Locations of confirmed impact craters in Africa, maximum ages:
Cenozoic
Mesozoic
Paleozoic
Precambrian

This list of impact structures in Africa includes all 20 confirmed impact craters as listed in the Earth Impact Database. These features were caused by the collision of large meteorites or comets with the Earth. For eroded or buried craters, the stated diameter typically refers to an estimate of original rim diameter, and may not correspond to present surface features.

Name	Location	Diameter (km)	Age (years)	Coordinates
Agoudal	Morocco	3?	105 ka?	31°59′N 5°30′W
Amguid	Algeria	0.45	< 100,000	26°5′N 4°24′E
Aorounga	Chad	12.6	< 345 million	19°6′N 19°15′E
Aouelloul	Mauritania	0.39	3.0 ± 0.3 million	20°15′N 12°41′W
BP	Libya	2	< 120 million	25°19′N 24°19′E
Bosumtwi	Ghana	10.5	1.07 million	6°30′N 1°25′W
Gweni-Fada	Chad	14	< 345 million	17°25′N 21°45′E
Kalkkop	South Africa	0.64	0.25 million	32°43′S 24°26′E
Kamil	Egypt	0.045	< 2000	22°1′6″N 26°5′15″E
Kgagodi	Botswana	3.5	< 180 million	22°29′S 27°35′E
Luizi	DRC	17	< 575 million	10°10′S 28°00′E
Morokweng	South Africa	70	145.0 ± 0.8 million	26°28′S 23°32′E
Nadir	Guinea	9.2	66 million	9°23′42″N 17°4′48″W
Oasis	Libya	18	< 120 million	24°35′N 24°24′E
Ouarkziz	Algeria	3.5	< 70 million	29°0′N 7°33′W
Roter Kamm	Namibia	2.5	3.7 ± 0.3 million	27°46′S 16°18′E
Talemzane	Algeria	1.75	< 3 million	33°19′N 4°2′E
Tenoumer	Mauritania	1.9	1.57 ± 0.14 million	22°55′N 10°24′W
Tin Bider	Algeria	6	< 70 million	27°36′N 5°7′E
Tswaing (previously Pretoria Saltpan)	South Africa	1.13	0.220 ± 0.052 million	25°24′30″S 28°04′58″E
Vredefort	South Africa	300	2023 ± 4 million	27°0′S 27°30′E

== Unconfirmed impact structures ==
The following craters are officially considered "unconfirmed" because they are not listed in the Earth Impact Database. Due to stringent requirements regarding evidence and peer-reviewed publication, newly discovered craters or those with difficulty collecting evidence generally are known for some time before becoming listed. However, entries on the unconfirmed list could still have an impact origin disproven.

Name	Location	Diameter	Age	Coordinates
Kebira	Gilf Kebir region, Egypt	31 km	100 million	24°40′N 24°58′E
Temimichat	Mauritania	0.75 km	unknown	24°15′N 9°39′W
Wembo-Nyama ring structure	DR Congo	36–46 km (est.)	60 million	3°37′52″S 24°31′07″E
Mahas^{1}	Northern, Sudan	2.85 km	Unknown	20°01′53″N 30°13′48″E
Circular feature with clear ca. rim 300 m above ground level centred around the hamlet of Baw	Blue Nile State	5 km	Unknown	11°20′00″N 30°03′00″E
Circular Feature	North-Central Niger	10 km	Unknown	21°21′14.56″N 9° 8′32.24″E
Vélingara circular structure	Kolda Region, Senegal	48 km	Unknown	13°00′00″N 14°08′00″W

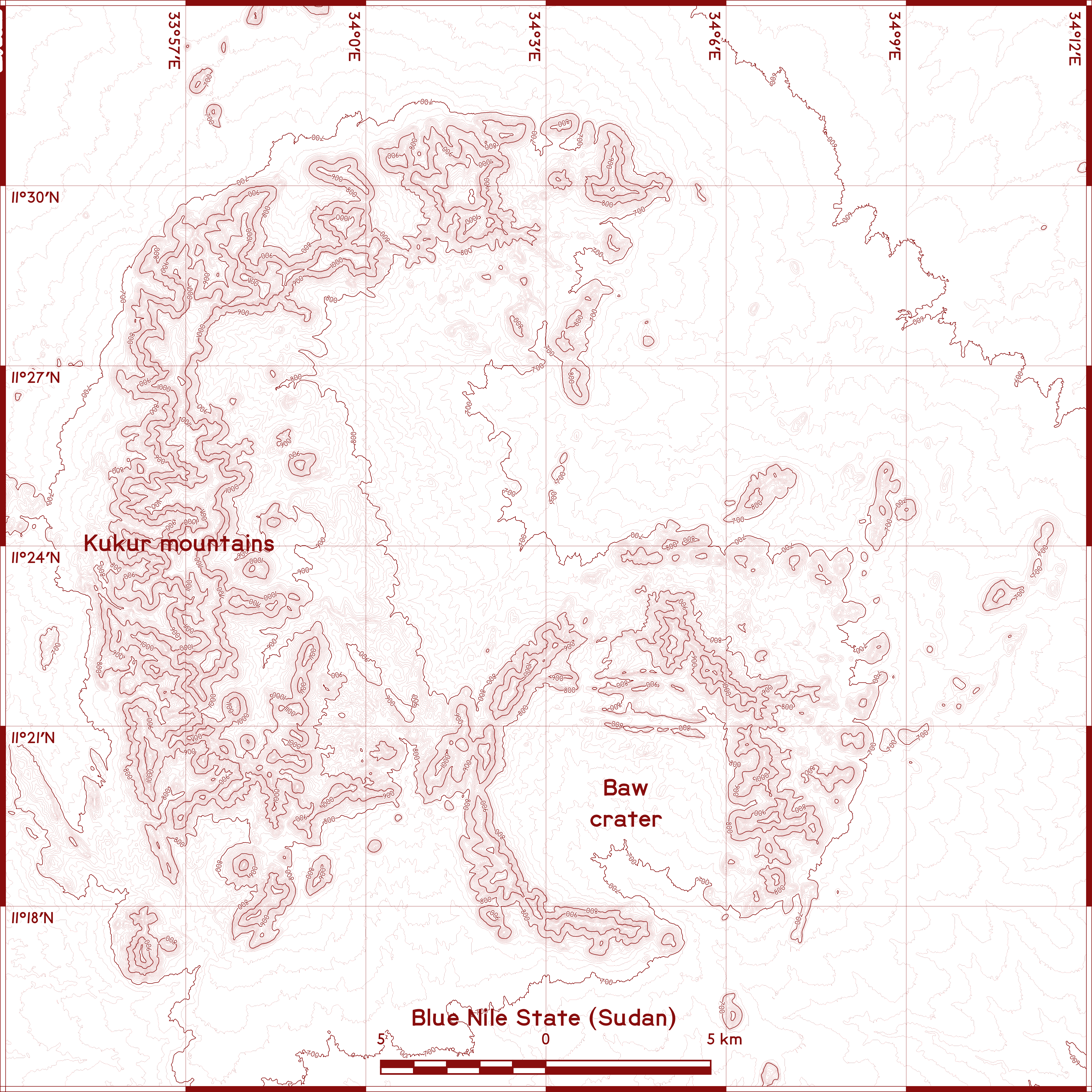
Topographic map of the potential impact structure around Baw, Blue Nile State / Sudan

== Notes ==
^{1}Mahas was anonymously added Jan 2015, but the coordinates do show a convincing impact-like structure.

== See also ==
- Impact craters
- Impact events
- Bolides and Meteorites
- Earth Impact Database – primary source
- Traces of Catastrophe book from Lunar and Planetary Institute - comprehensive reference on impact crater science
