= Gweni-Fada crater =

Meteorite crater in the Ennedi Plateau, Chad, Africa

Gweni-Fada Crater
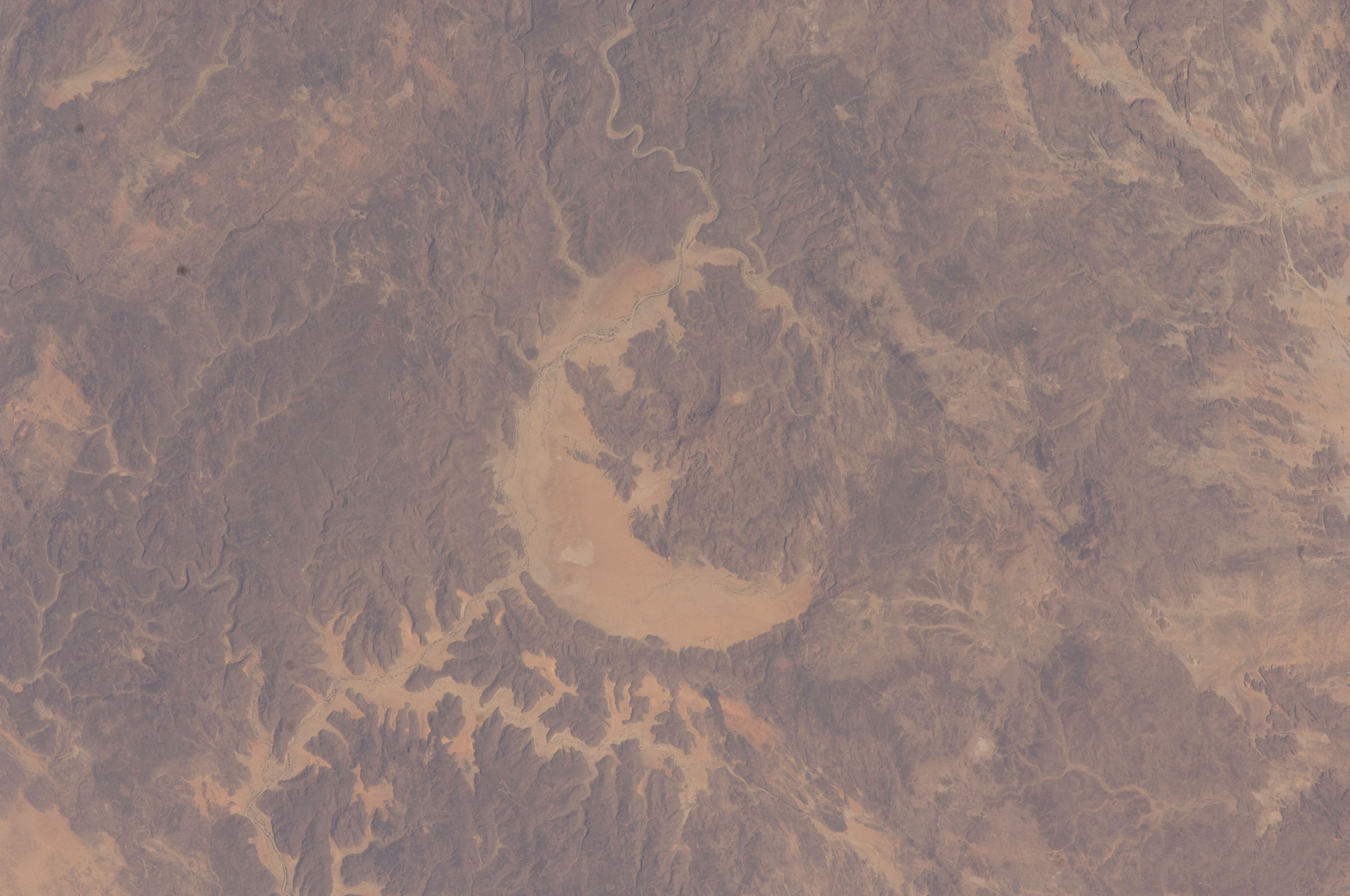
- Gweni-Fada Crater viewed from the International Space Station

- Location within Chad
- Location: Ennedi-Ouest, Chad; 17°25′7″N 21°45′8″E

Impact crater structure
- Confidence: Confirmed
- Diameter: c. 14 km
- Age: c. 345 million years
- Exposed: Yes
- Drilled: No

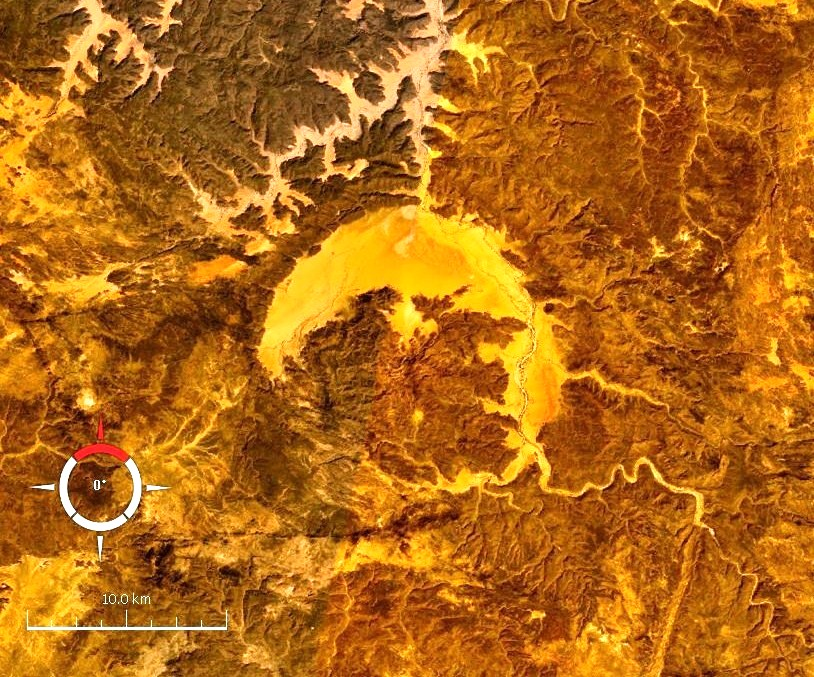
Landsat image of the Gweni-Fada Crater; screen capture from NASA World Wind

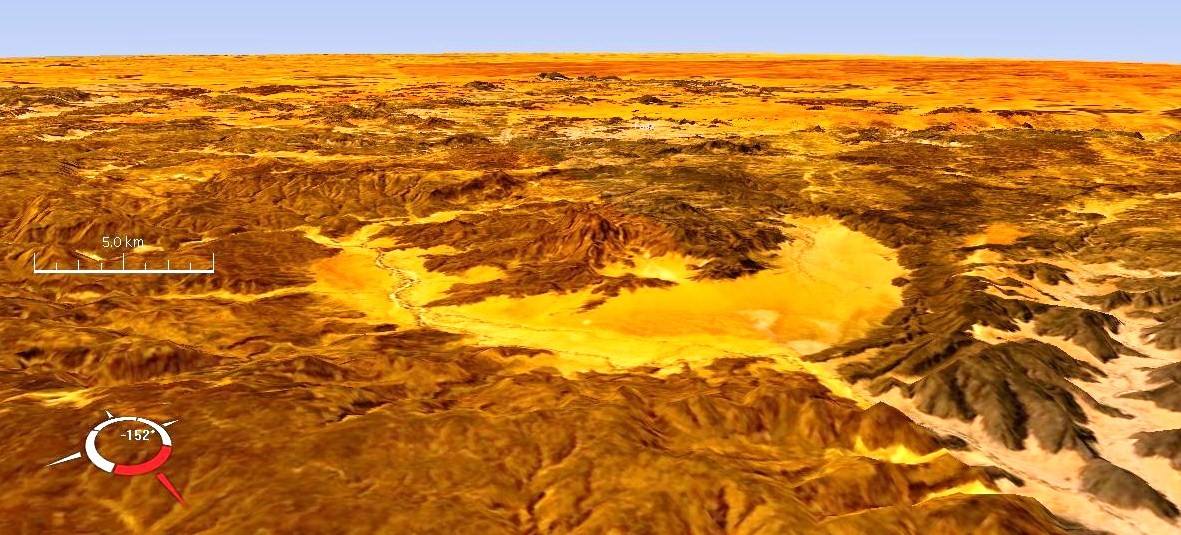
Oblique Landsat image of Gweni-Fada Crater draped over digital elevation model (x2 vertical exaggeration); screen capture from NASA World Wind

Gweni-Fada Crater is an impact crater in the Ennedi Plateau in Chad.

The Gweni Fada structure was first noted on the map NE 34 X Fada of the IGN (National Geographic Institute France) and aerial photographs in the 1950s of IGN by Alain Beauvilain (Paris X- Nanterre University). In April 1995, at the initiative of CNAR (National Center to Help Research of Chad) a team of French geologists (Pierre Vincent, University of Clermont-Ferrand, Alain and Najia Beauvilain, CNAR Chad) visited the site and reported evidence of shock metamorphism within rock samples they had collected inside the structure.

Centered at 17°25′N and 21°45′E, being slightly wider in the NW-SE direction (cf. topographic map), the asymmetric structure is deeply eroded. A broad depression (diameter 12 km) forms a crescent around two thirds of the inner complex zone. On the northern side, an elevated outer ring of outward-dipping sandstones surrounds the depression. In its south, the external depression is absent. The inner zone (diameter 10 km) consists of a rugged terrain with hills several hundred meters in height. The latter may be remnants of the central uplift (see topographic map).

The age is estimated to be less than 345 million years (Carboniferous). It is older than that of Aorounga Crater because its coverage of impactite has disappeared as a result of erosion.

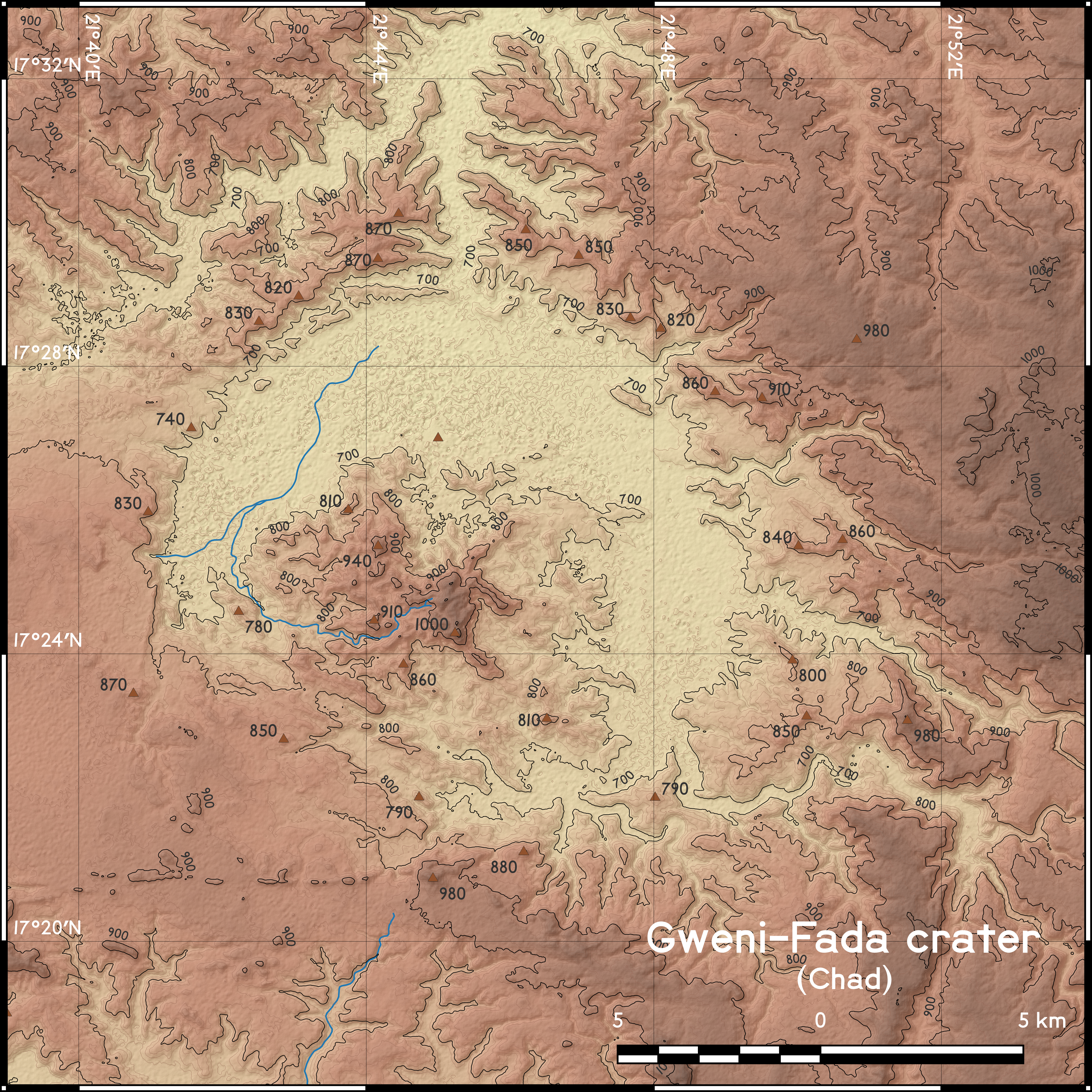
Topographic map of Gweni-Fada Crater

== See also ==
- List of impact craters in Africa
  - Aorounga crater
