= Aorounga crater =

Prehistoric impact crater

Aorounga Crater
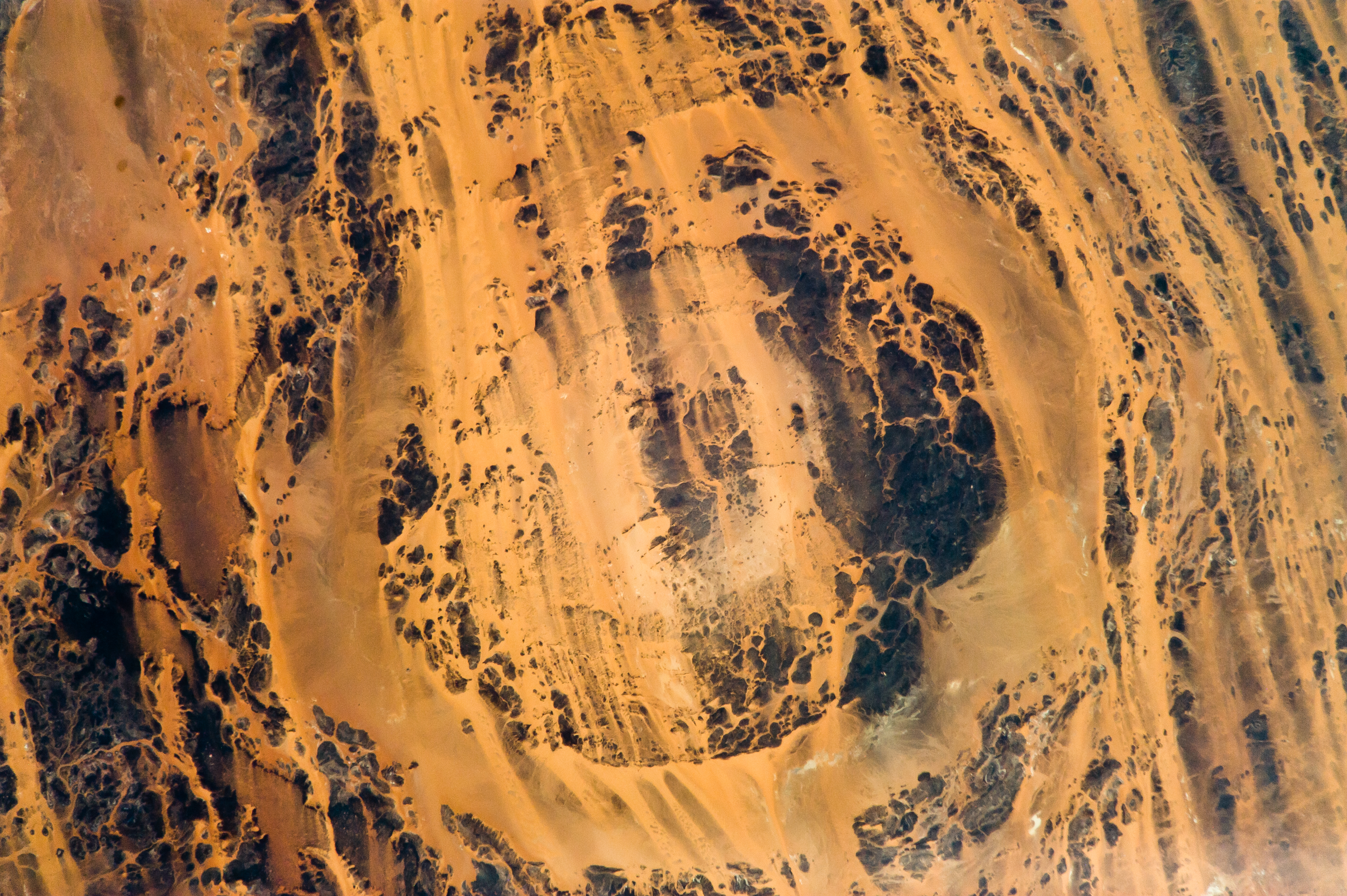

- Location within Chad
- Location: Borkou, Chad; 19°6′N 19°15′E

Impact crater structure
- Confidence: Confirmed
- Diameter: 12.6 km (7.8 mi)
- Age: c. 345 million years
- Exposed: Yes
- Drilled: No

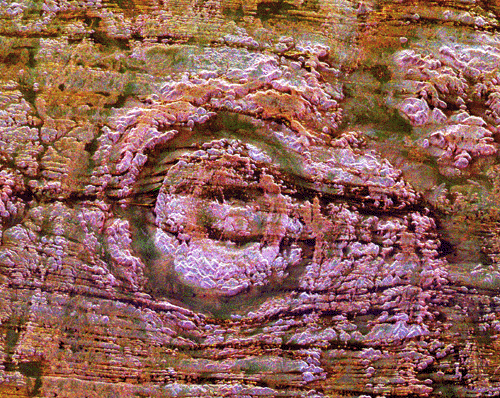
Synthetic Aperture Radar image of Aorounga Crater

Aorounga Crater is an impact crater in Chad. The exposed remnant of the crater is 12.6 km (7.8 mi) in diameter and its age is estimated to be less than 345 million years (Carboniferous or younger).

== Description ==
An outer and an inner ring (11 and 7 kilometres [6.8 and 4.3 mi], respectively) rise about 100 metres (330 ft) above the mean level of the surrounding plain (see topographic map). Both aforementioned rings are separated by a relatively flat depression of uniform width. A possible central hill, maybe an uplift structure, of 1.5 kilometres (0.93 mi) is almost centrally located in the depression.

The crater is accompanied by two nearby circular features revealed by Space Shuttle SIR-C radar. These may be related impact craters, and if correct, Aorounga may be part of a crater chain. On the assumption that this hypothesis is correct, the exposed Aorounga crater is sometimes referred to as Aorounga South. The central highland, or peak, of the crater is surrounded by a small sand-filled trough; this, in turn, is surrounded by a larger circular trough. Linear rock ridges alternating with light orange sand deposits cross the image from upper left to lower right; these are called yardangs by geomorphologists. Yardangs form by wind erosion of exposed rock layers in a unidirectional wind field. The wind blows from the northeast at Aorounga, and sand dunes formed between the yardangs are actively migrating to the southwest.

=== Geology ===
The geology of the two craters was summarised based on published geological information for Aorounga (Becq-Giraudon et al. 1992) and Gweni Fada Aorounga, a circular depression, appears on some regional geographic maps and has a visible present-day diameter of ~13 km. It is situated in northern Chad about 110 km southeast of the Emi Koussi volcano in the Tibesti Massif. A photogeological investigation of Gemini, Apollo, Landsat, and aerial photographs suggested an origin either as a granite diapir or an impact crater. The structure was mentioned as a possible impact crater by Grieve et al. (1988). A French expedition collected a few samples from the structure and reported the first observation of shock deformation.

The crater, formed in fine-grained, well-sorted, slightly carbonate-bearing sandstone possibly of Upper Devonian age, is characterised by outer and inner rings rising about 100 m above the surrounding plain. The two rings are separated by a depression of uniform width. The ring walls consist of steeply outward dipping sandstone layers, with some breccia found on top of the inner rim wall. No reliable age dating exists for Aorounga Crater. Cosmogenic nuclide exposure dating suggested a minimum age of 500,000 years, indicating a minimum age for the impact event. The Gweni Fada structure, estimated to be ~14 km in diameter, is located about 320 km southeast of Aorounga. The structure is centred at 17°25′ N and 21°45′ E, and appears asymmetric and deeply eroded. A French team reported shock metamorphic effects in quartz grains from sandstones. The structure occurs in sandstones of probable Upper Devonian age. Remote sensing analysis using Shuttle Radar Topography Mission (SRTM) data provided detailed topographic information about the Aorounga structure.

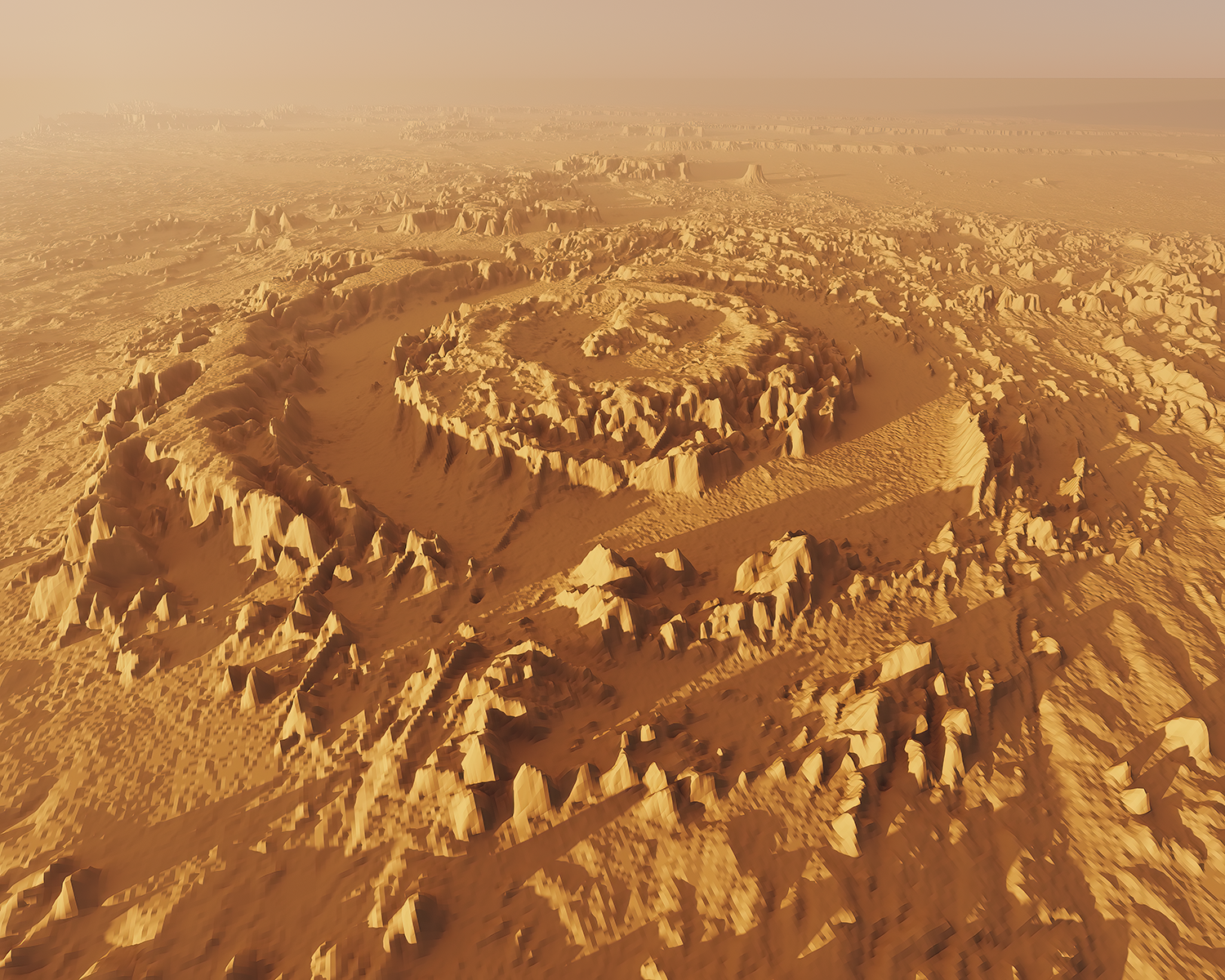
Rendering of Aorounga Crater using DEM, elevations exaggerated for emphasis

The Aorounga impact structure is recognised as a multi-ring structure, with a central complex surrounded by a near-circular ring feature of strong elevation, followed by the flat annulus and an outer ring, presumably the actual crater rim zone. A maximum diameter for the Aorounga structure of 16 km is proposed. Superposition of Landsat 5 scene onto SRTM data provides a realistic 3-D perspective of the crater region.

Topographic map of Aorounga Crater

== See also ==
- List of impact craters in Africa
  - Gweni-Fada crater
