= Aurus Mountain =

Mountain in Namibia

Aurus
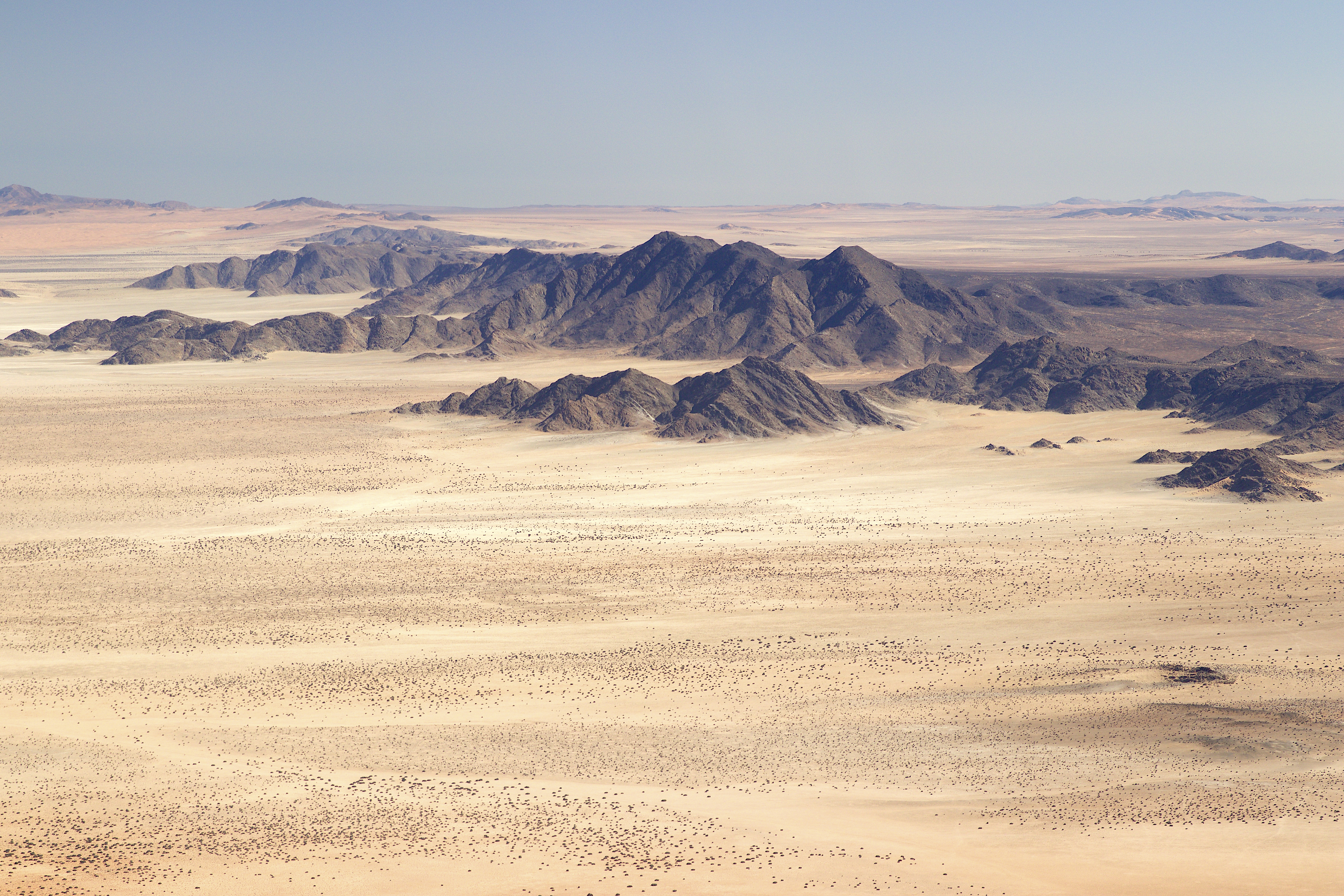
- Aerial view of Aurus in the Diamond Restricted Area (2018)

Highest point
- Elevation: 1,050 m (3,440 ft)
- Coordinates: 27°39′22″S 016°19′09″E

Geography
- Location within Namibia
- Country: Namibia
- Region: Karas

Aurus is a mountain at the eastern border of the Diamond Restricted Area also called Sperrgebiet, in the southwestern part of Namibia. It reaches a height of 1,050 m. Its expansion is about 5 km × 4 km.

The meteor crater Roter Kamm is located in a distance of 12 km south-southwest of Aurus. The crater can also be seen well on satellite images.

35 and 55 km southeast of the Aurus Mountain zinc is mined in both the Skorpion and the Rosh Pinah mine.

Several places of the mountain range are covered with sand which is blown over by sandstorms. The average yearly rainfall in this area of the Namib amounts to just a few millimeters.

The bushes to be found in the mountains just survive because of the mist, which sometimes is formed above the cold Atlantic and then during daytime drifts far into the desert. The few camel thorn trees take their water from deep underground accumulations.

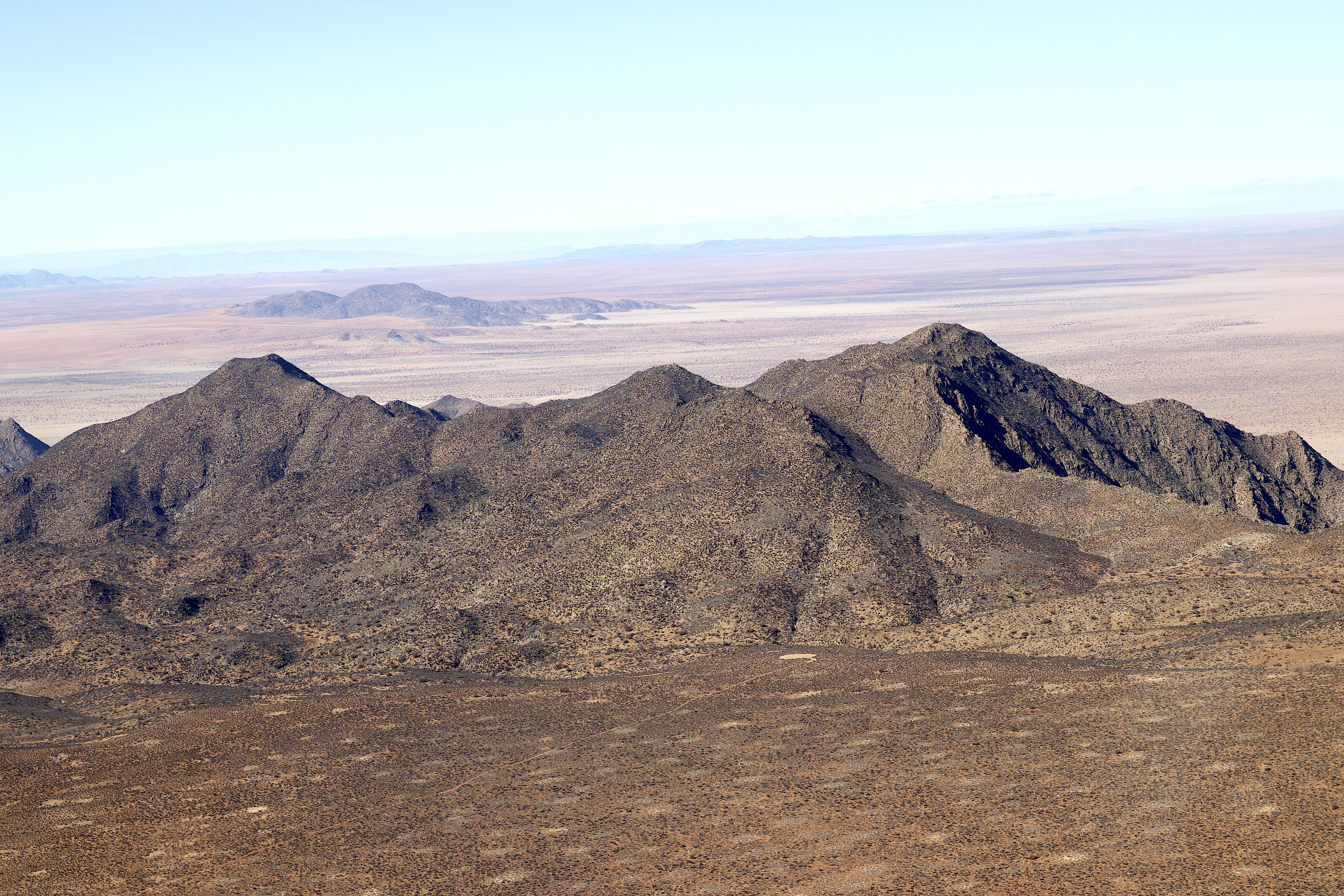
Aerial view of Aurus Mountain 2018

== Pictures ==
Pictures of Aurus Mountains
