= Amguid crater =

Meteorite crater in Algeria

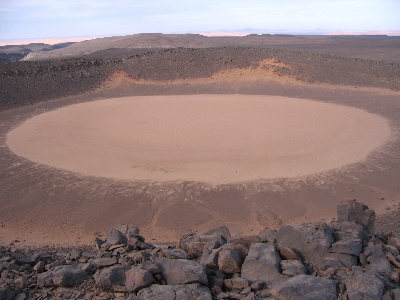

- Location within Algeria
- Location: Sahara, Tamanrasset Province, Algeria; 26°5′16″N 4°23′43″E

Impact crater structure
- Confidence: Confirmed
- Diameter: 500–530 m (1,640–1,740 ft)
- Depth: 65 m (213 ft)
- Age: <1 Ma; Pleistocene
- Exposed: Yes
- Drilled: No

Amguid is a meteorite crater located in the Central Sahara, Algeria. It is approximately 500 to 530 metres (1,640 to 1,740 ft) in diameter and approximately 65 meters deep. Its age has been estimated to be less than 100,000 years and probably formed during the Pleistocene epoch making it relatively young. The origins of the impact was likely low-velocity and from an asteroid. It was possibly a carbonaceous chondritic that was loosely compacted and strongly unequilibrated. Studied of the craters mineralogy has excluded potential hypotheses of hypervelocity metallic bodies causing the crater.

The crater was discovered by Karpoff in 1948 by aircraft and the first scientific description was made by Jean-Phillippe Lefranc in 1969. It was then later studied more by Lambert and Lamali in 1980 and 2009. The crater is understudied as access is only possible on foot. It is possible to walk for a week or more with camel support from Tadjemout spring, north of Arak. Or drive down from the Tin Habedra piste to the Erg Bou Zerafa dunes, then walk for a day from Aguelman Rahla waterhole along the Oued Tafrakrek canyon, then climb onto the plateau to the site.

== Morphology ==
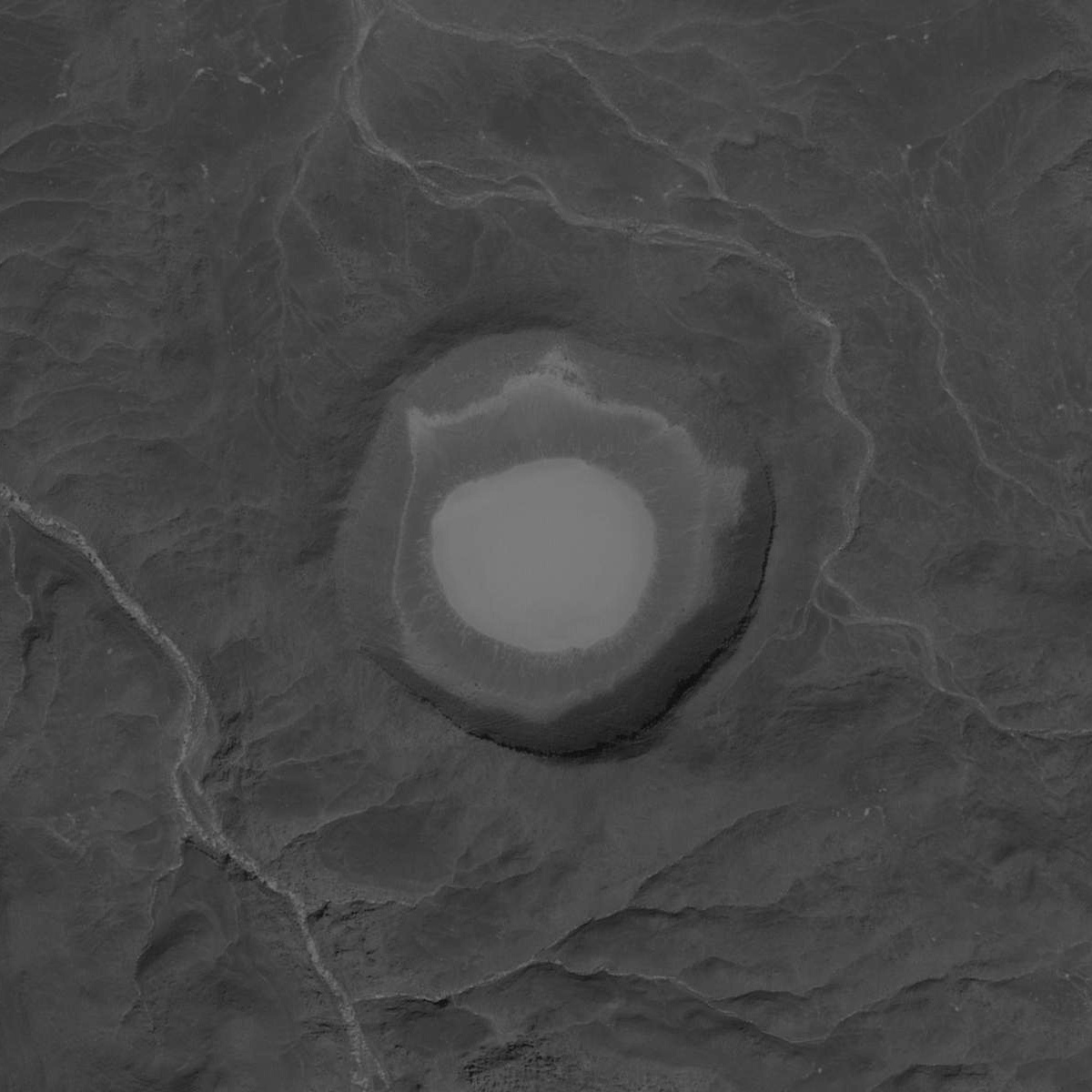
OrbView-3 satellite view of the crater

It is a well-preserved crater that is exposed at the surface. It is visible due to its location in the Sahara desert where it’s very arid and devoid vegetation cover. These factors make the crater pristine like other craters located in Algeria. It has an almost perfectly circular structure with the central part being collapsed. The southeastern section of the craters rim is steeper than the rest of the perimeter. The walls of the crater dips and gets progressively steeper in its upper parts. From the crater, there are well highlighted radial and fold features.

== Geology ==
In the flat center of Amguid crater, the dominant rocks are partially filled with very bright, fine-grained eolian compacted silt. Part of it is also covered in covered by detrital materials composed of fall-back breccias which contains fine-grained components. The white spot in the center is the result of rain running into the center and evaporating.

The rim of the crater is studded with breccia. Shatter cones are also located at the crater. On the internal walls of the craters rim, there are distinct series of sandstone bed outcroppings.

It landed in Lower Devonian rocks that is composed of sandstone from the extern Tassili series.

== See also ==
- List of impact craters in Africa
