= Talemzane crater =

Impact crater in Algeria

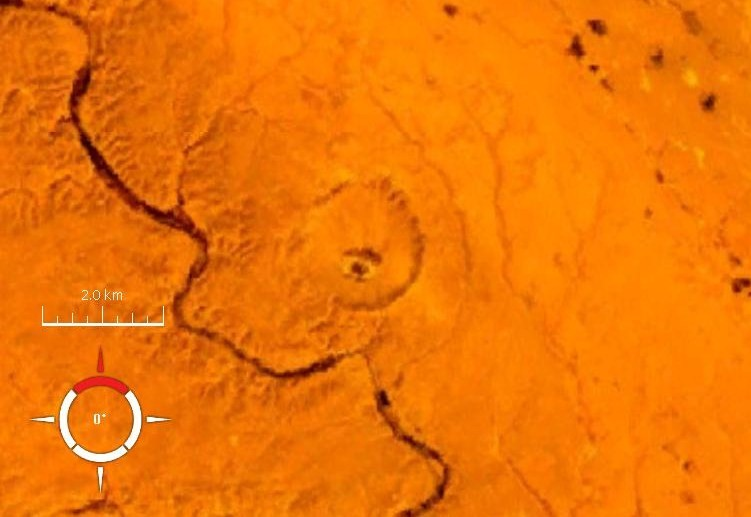
- Landsat image of the Talemzane crater; screen capture from NASA World Wind

- Location within Algeria
- Location: Sahara, Laghouat Province, Algeria; 33°18′54″N 4°2′7″E

Impact crater structure
- Confidence: Confirmed
- Diameter: 1.75 km (1.09 mi)
- Age: <3 Ma; Piacenzian
- Exposed: No
- Drilled: Yes

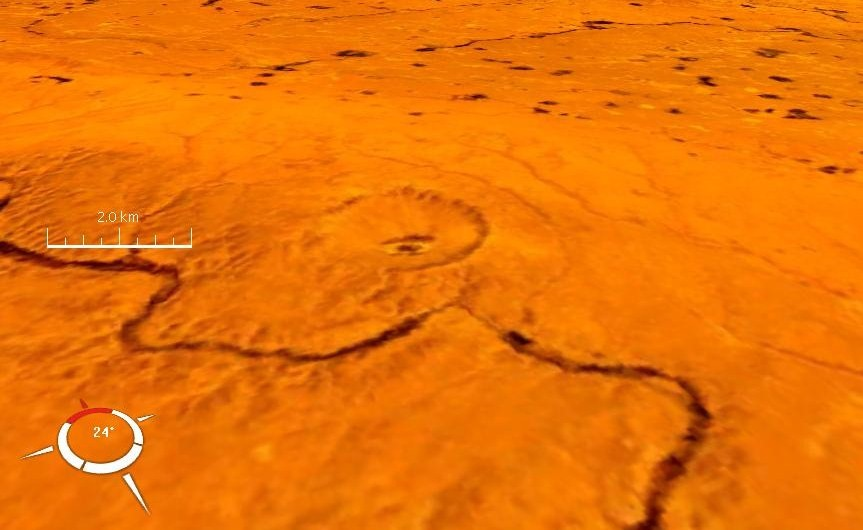
Oblique Landsat image of Talemzane crater draped over digital elevation model (x3 vertical exaggeration); screen capture from NASA World Wind

Talemzane or madena (Tamazight: ⵜⴰⵍⴻⵎⵣⴰⵏ Arabic: تالمزان/مادنة) is an impact crater in Algeria, 40 km south-east of Hassi Delaa (a small city). The Arabic name of the crater is "Maadna" and means "depression of ore."

The Talemzane crater has a diameter of 1.75 km. As such, it is classified as a "simple crater" (meaning a diameter of less than 2 km). It is one of two simple craters in Algeria's Saharan Platform. According to estimates, the crater formed between 203,000 and 3 million years ago. The crater was explored for the first time in 1928 and studied in 1950 and 1988 by researchers from the universities of Oran (Algeria) and Nice (France).

== See also ==
- List of impact craters in Africa
