= Roter Kamm crater =

Meteorite crater in the Namibian section of the Namib Desert

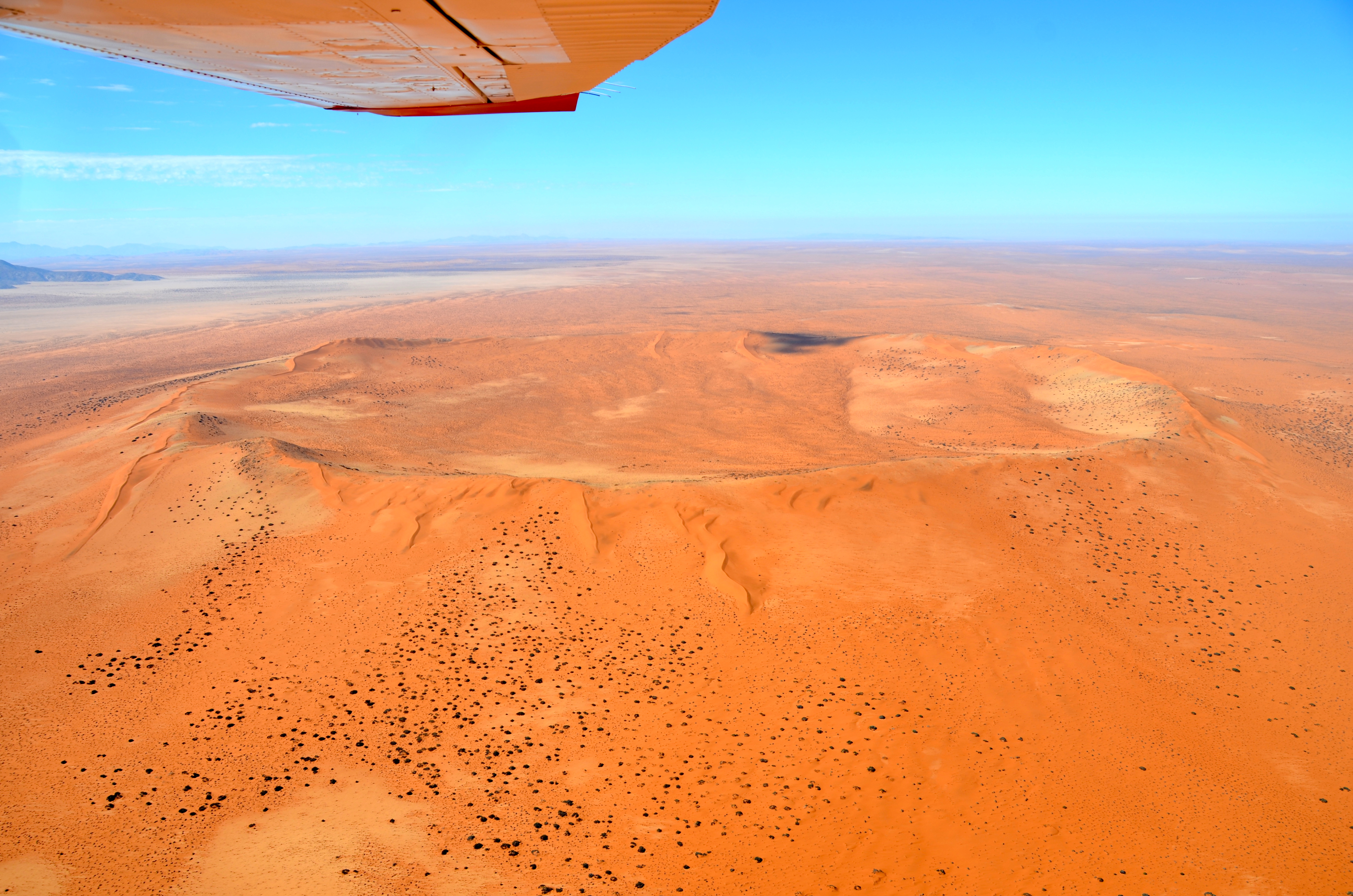
- Roter Kamm, aerial view direction south (April 2017)

- Location within Namibia
- Location: Sperrgebiet, Namib Desert, ǁKaras Region, Namibia; 27°46′0″S 16°17′20″E

Impact crater structure
- Confidence: Confirmed
- Diameter: 2.5 km (1.6 mi)
- Age: 4.81 ± 0.5 Ma; Zanclean
- Exposed: Yes
- Drilled: No

Roter Kamm (German: Red Ridge) is a meteorite crater, located in the Sperrgebiet, within the Namibian section of the Namib Desert, approximately 80 kilometres (50 mi) north of Oranjemund and 12 kilometres (7.5 mi) southwest of Aurus Mountain in the ǁKaras Region. The crater is 2.5 kilometres (1.6 mi) in diameter and is 130 metres (430 ft) deep. The age is estimated at 4.81 ± 0.5 Ma, placing it in the Pliocene. The crater is exposed at the surface, but its original floor is covered by sand deposits at least 100 metres (330 ft) thick.

== Description ==
The meteorite hit a layer of Precambrian granitic gneiss that is part of the Namaqua Metamorphic Complex, overlaid with some younger sedimentary rocks. No parts of the meteorite have been found, suggesting that it completely evaporated upon impact. The meteor that hit it was approximately the size of an SUV.

The Roter Kamm impact structure exposes a large volume of cataclastic/mylonitic and pseudotachylitic breccias in the basement granite and gneisses, which is unusual for small craters. Anomalous quartz found at the rim of the crater, and the primary fluid inclusions in the quartz, seem to provide evidence for post-impact hydrothermal activity, generated by impact heat, at the Roter Kamm impact crater. Eolian and alluvial processes each played a role in modifying the Roter Kamm impact crater since its formation. Much of the more recent history of crater modification relates to eolian processes. Active mobile sands largely bury the crater and effectively mask most of the signatures associated with prior activity by other processes. Ongoing eolian erosion is responsible for scouring of the exposed rim.

== Gallery ==
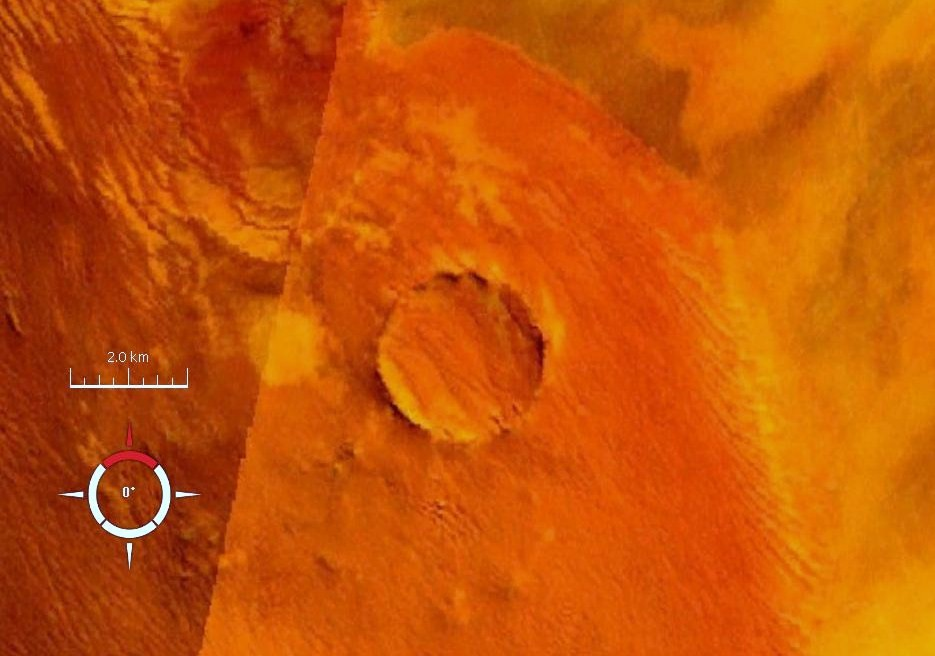
Landsat image of the Roter Kamm crater; screen capture from NASA World Wind

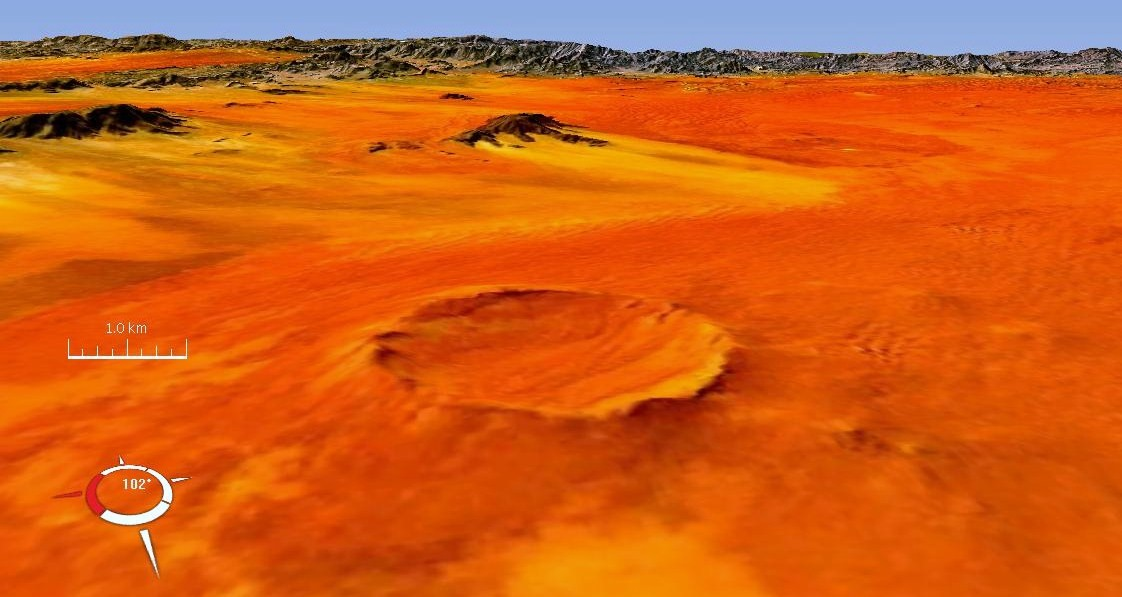
Oblique Landsat image of Roter Kamm crater draped over digital elevation model (x2 vertical exaggeration); screen capture from NASA World Wind

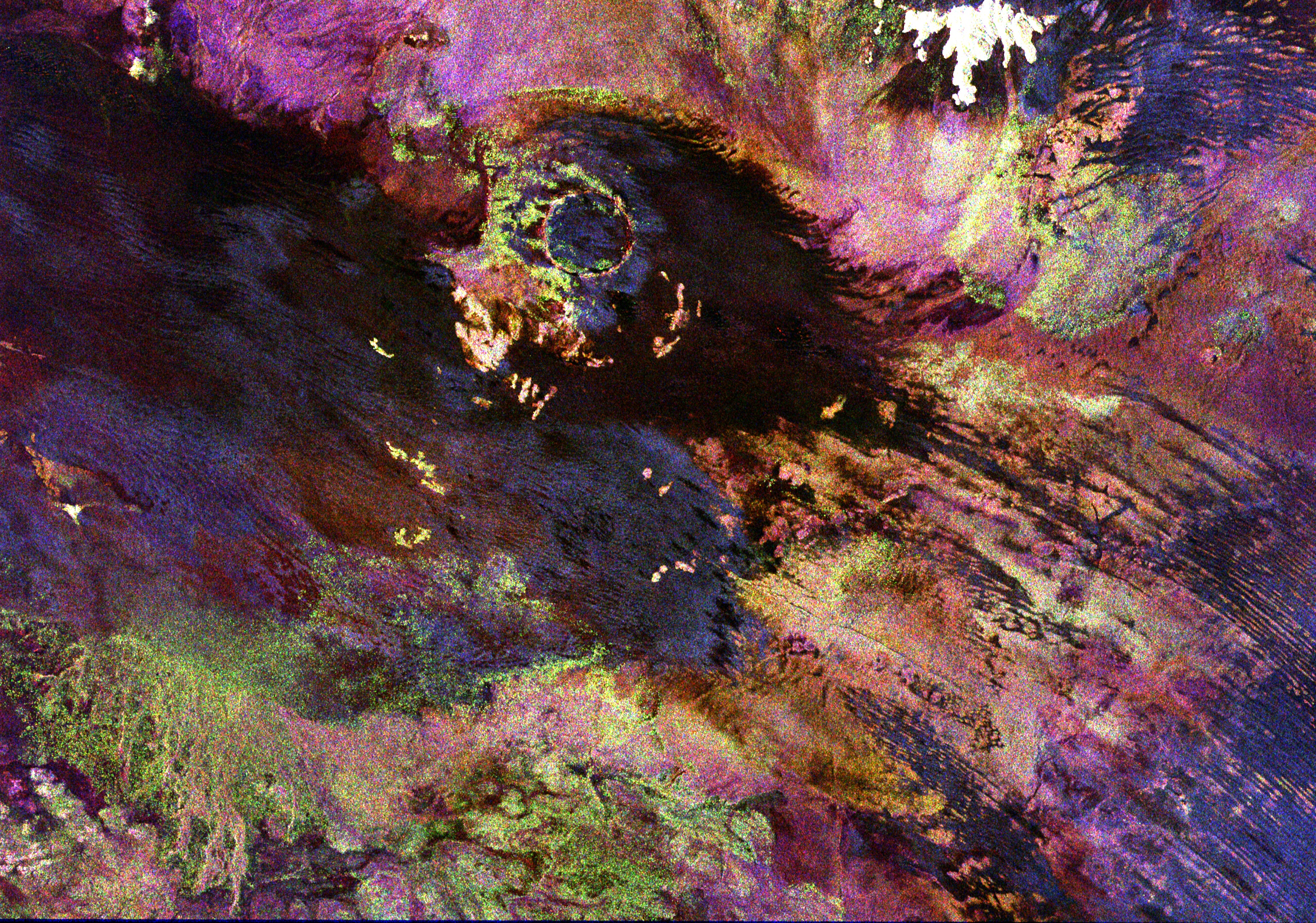
False color space radar (SAR-C/X-SAR) image of Roter Kamm impact crater

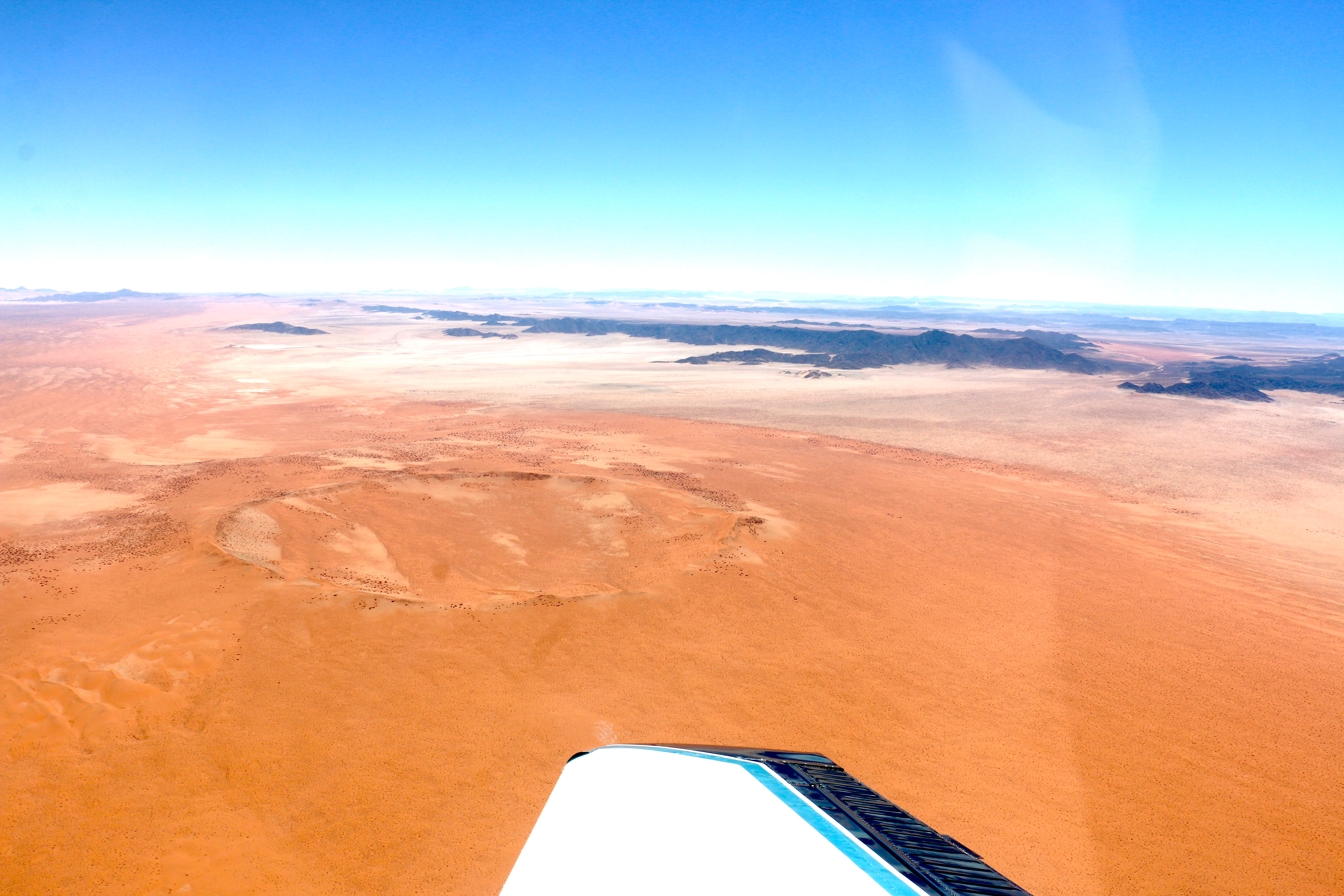
Roter Kamm Bird's eye view direction North

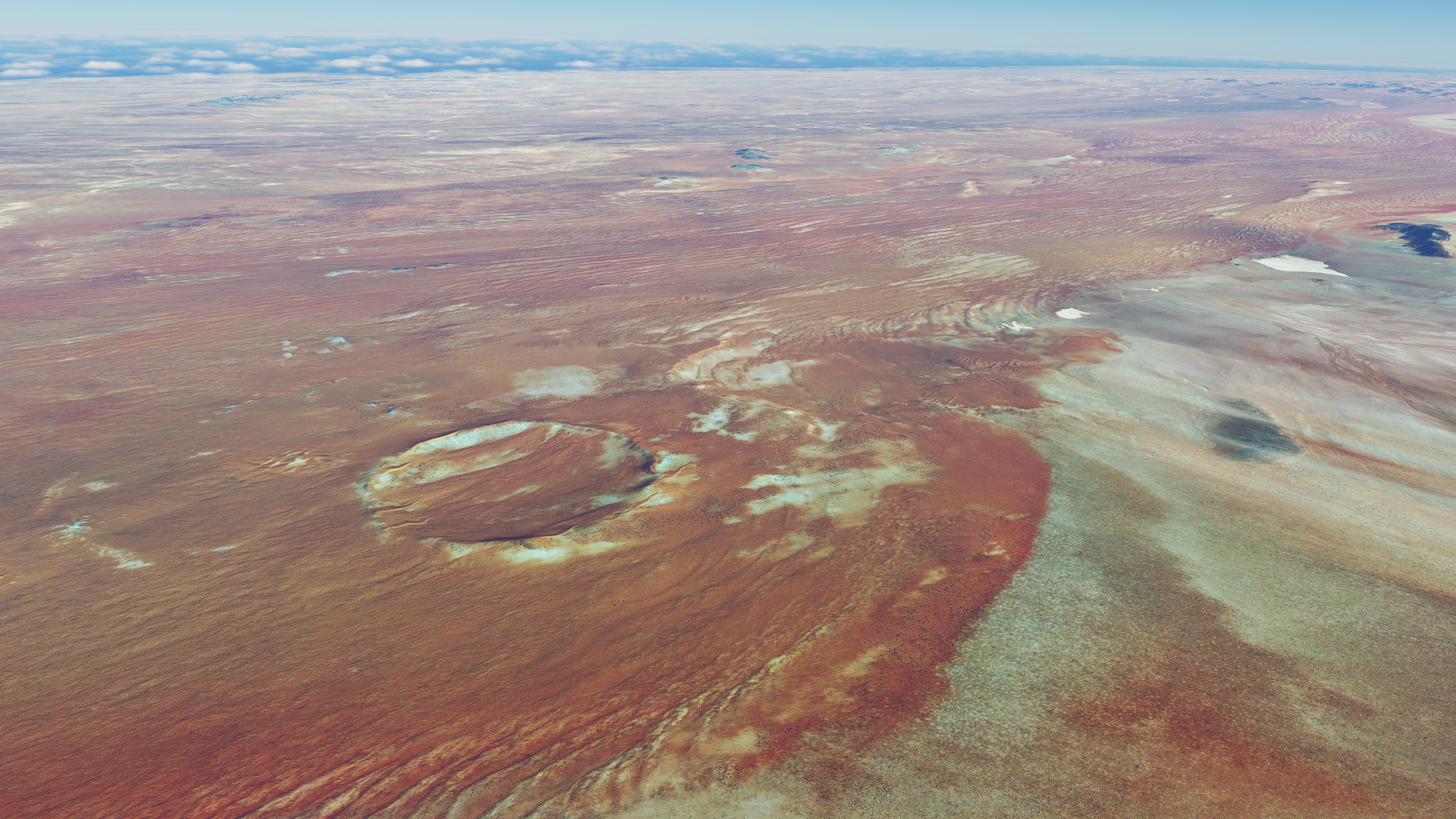
Image of Roter Kamm crater at 14 000 ft facing west; screen capture taken within Microsoft Flight Simulator

== See also ==
- List of impact craters in Africa
- Geology of Namibia
