= Ouarkziz crater =

Ouarkziz Crater
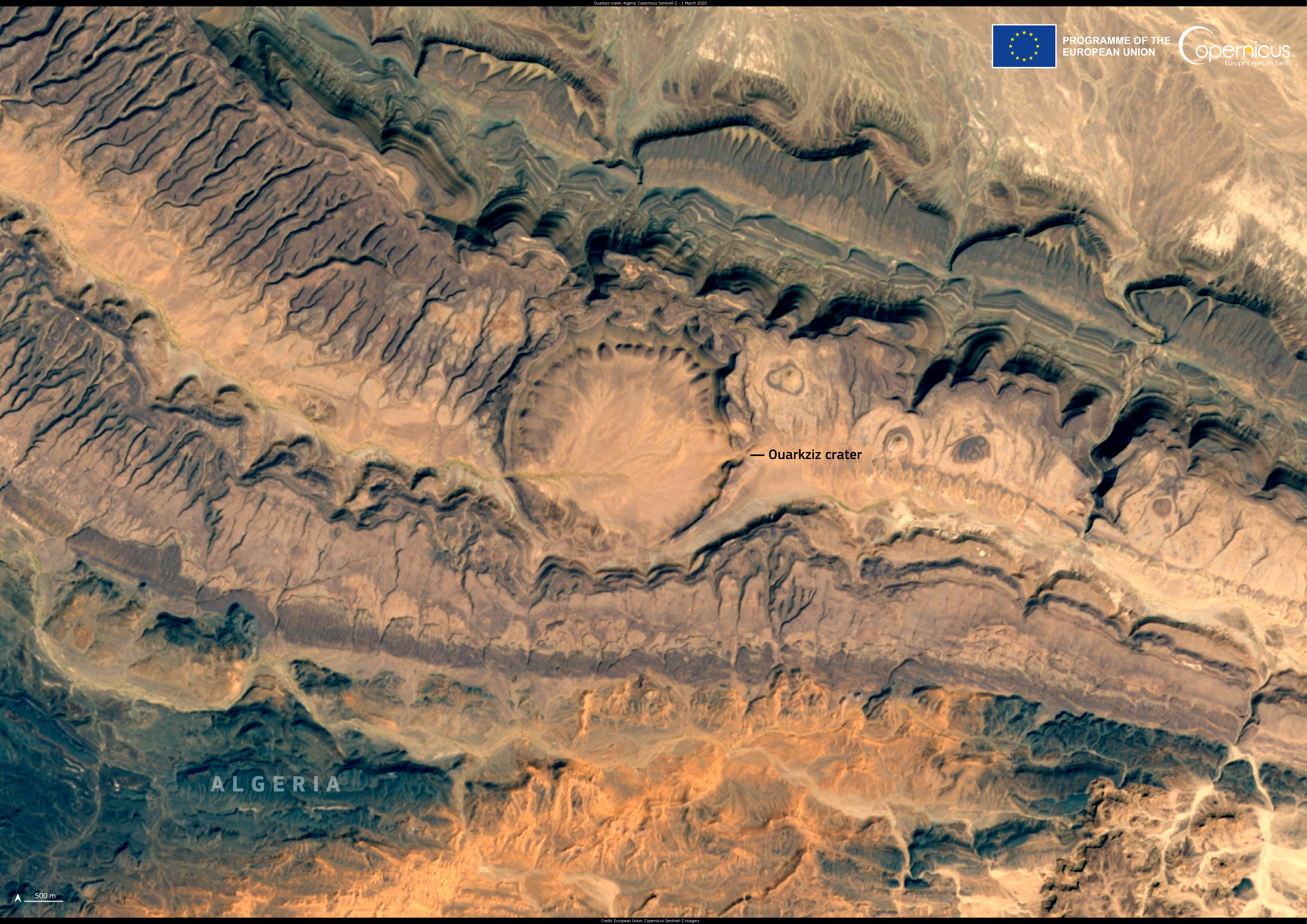

- Location within Algeria
- Location: Oum El Assel, Tindouf, Algeria; 29°0′42″N 7°33′8″W

Impact crater structure
- Confidence: Confirmed
- Diameter: 3.5 km (2.2 mi)
- Age: c. 70 million years
- Exposed: Yes
- Drilled: No

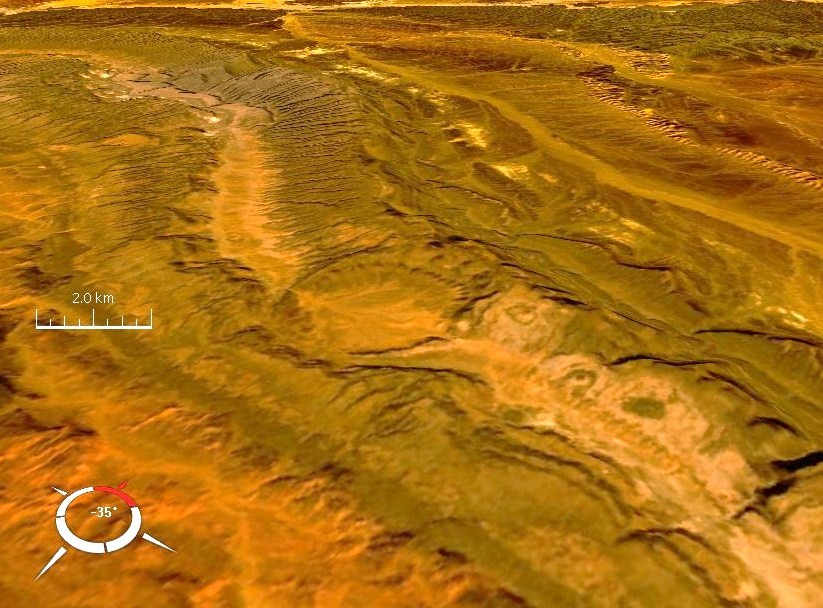
Oblique Landsat image of Ouarkziz crater draped over digital elevation model (x2 vertical exaggeration); screen capture from NASA World Wind

Ouarkziz Crater (Arabic: أوركزيز) is an impact crater in Tindouf, Algeria. It is 3.5 kilometers in diameter and the age is estimated to be less than 70 million years (Cretaceous or younger). The crater is exposed at the surface.

Ouarkziz Crater is located in northwestern Algeria, close to the border with Morocco. The crater was formed by a meteor impact less than 70 million years ago, during the late Cretaceous Period of the Mesozoic Era.

Originally called Tindouf, the 3.5-kilometer wide crater has been heavily eroded since its formation; however, its circular morphology is highlighted by exposures of older sedimentary rock layers that form roughly northwest to southeast-trending ridgelines. From the vantage point of an astronaut on the International Space Station, the impact crater is clearly visible with a magnifying camera lens.

A geologist interpreting this image to build a geological history of the region would conclude that Ouarkziz Crater is younger than the sedimentary rocks, as the rock layers had to be already present for the meteor to hit them. Likewise, a stream channel is visible cutting across the center of the structure, indicating that the channel formed after the impact had occurred. This Principle of Cross-Cutting Relationships, usually attributed to geologist Charles Lyell, is a basic logic tool used by geologists to build relative sequence and history of events when investigating a region.

== See also ==
- List of impact craters in Africa
