= Tin Bider crater =

Impact crater in Algeria

Tin Bider Crater
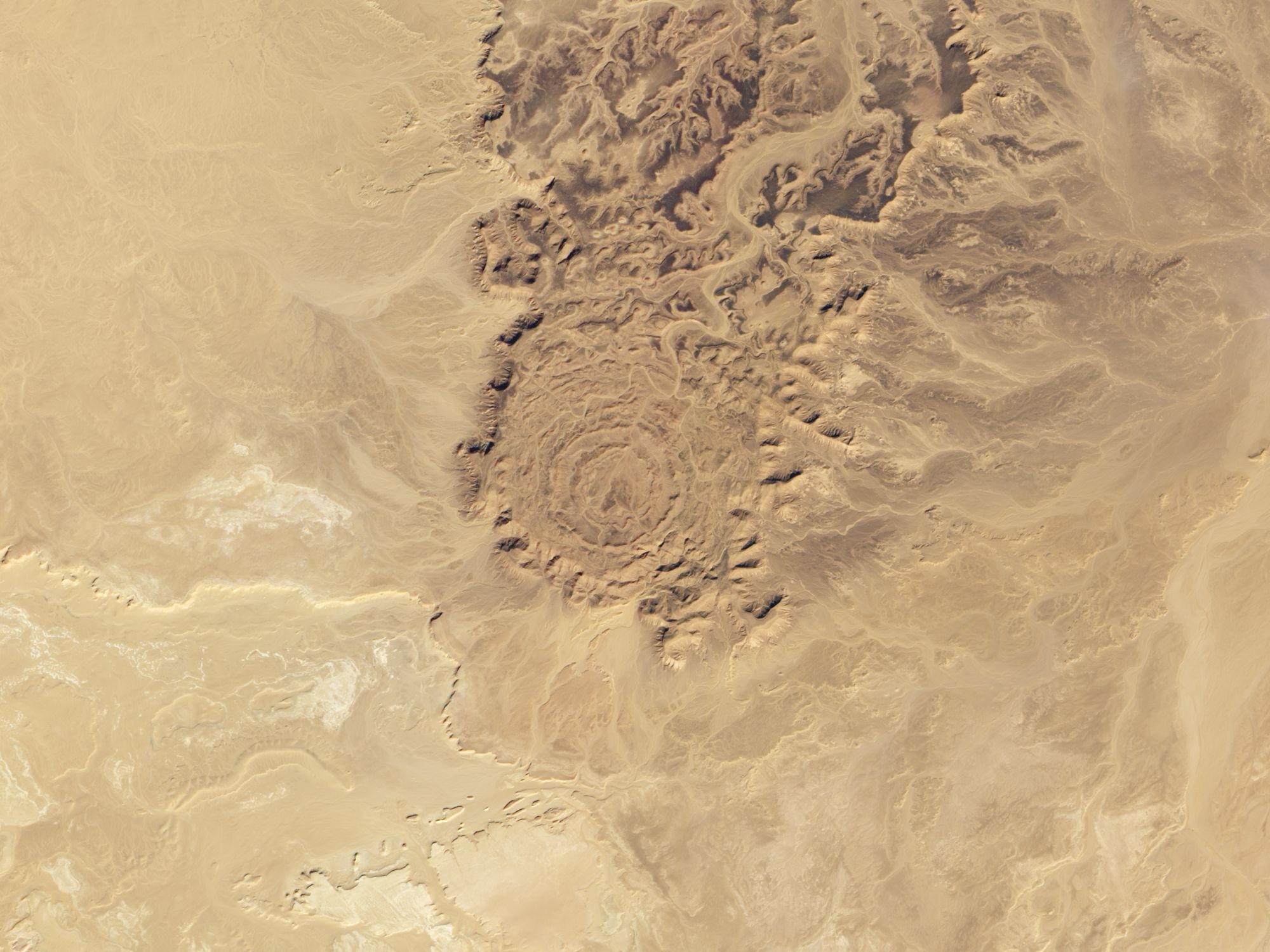

- Location within Algeria
- Location: Foggaret Ezzaouia, Tamanrasset, Algeria; 27°36′7″N 5°6′44″E

Impact crater structure
- Confidence: Confirmed
- Diameter: c. 6 km
- Age: c. 70 million years
- Exposed: Yes
- Drilled: No

Tin Bider Crater (Arabic: تين بيدر) is an impact crater that sits in dry, rugged terrain in Algeria. The crater was formed in the last 70 million years, perhaps in the late Cretaceous or early Paleogene Period. Spanning around 6 kilometres, the crater sits at the southern end of a range of hills. The elevated position and concentric rings of Tin Bider suggest that its structure is complex.

Massive sandstones attributable to the Lower Cretaceous, known throughout the Sahara Desert, are only exposed in the craters center, about 500 meters above its usual stratigraphic position.

Because of the large prominence of ductile deformation, Tin Bider significantly differs from other craters. While there is yet no conclusive explanation for this unique condition, Tin Bider could provide important information toward a better understanding of large-scale impact cratering.

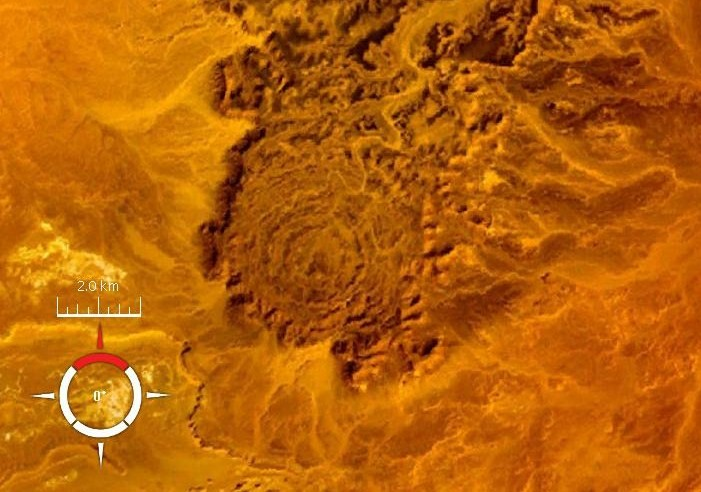
Landsat image of the Tin Bider crater; screen capture from NASA World Wind

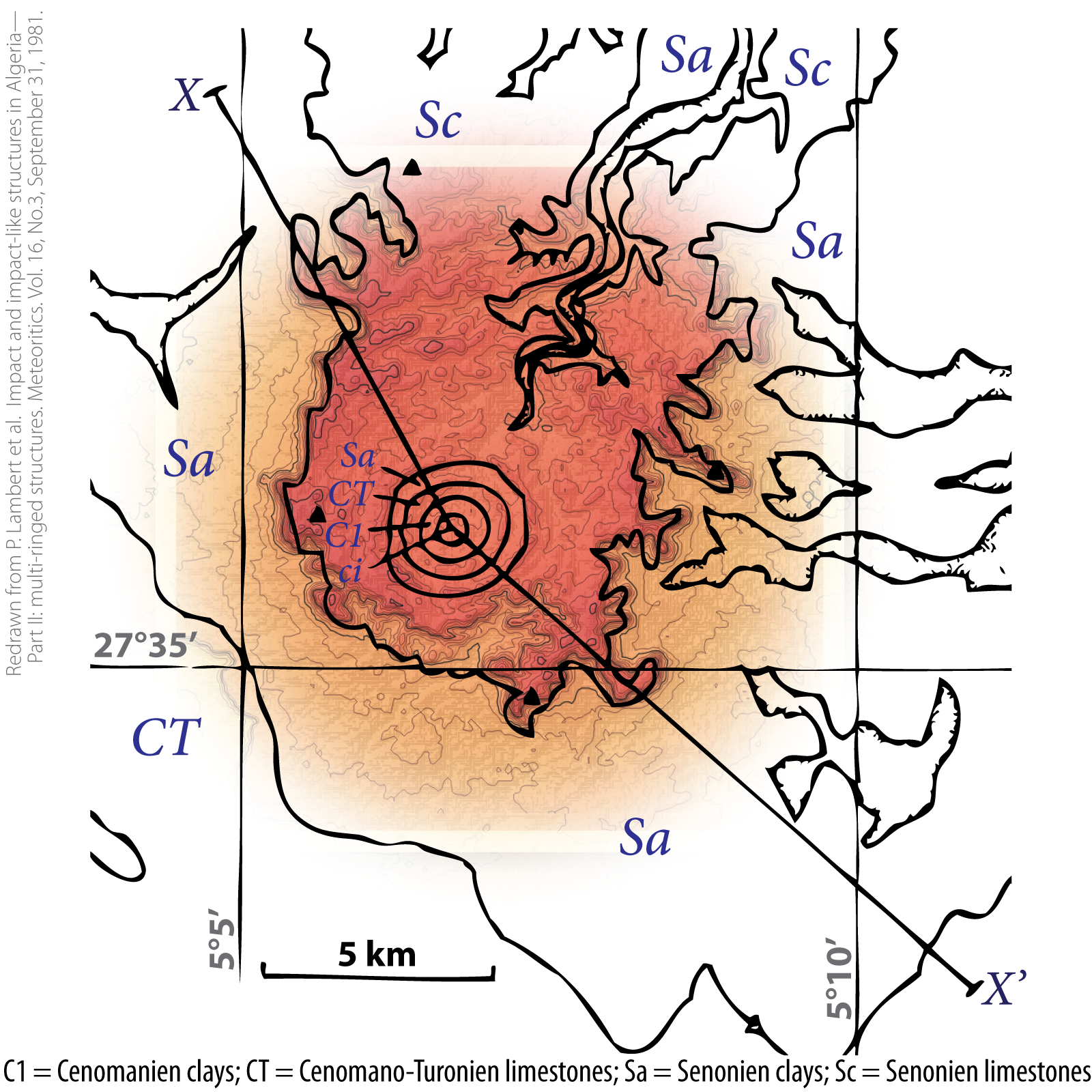
Schematic map of Tin Bider impact structure

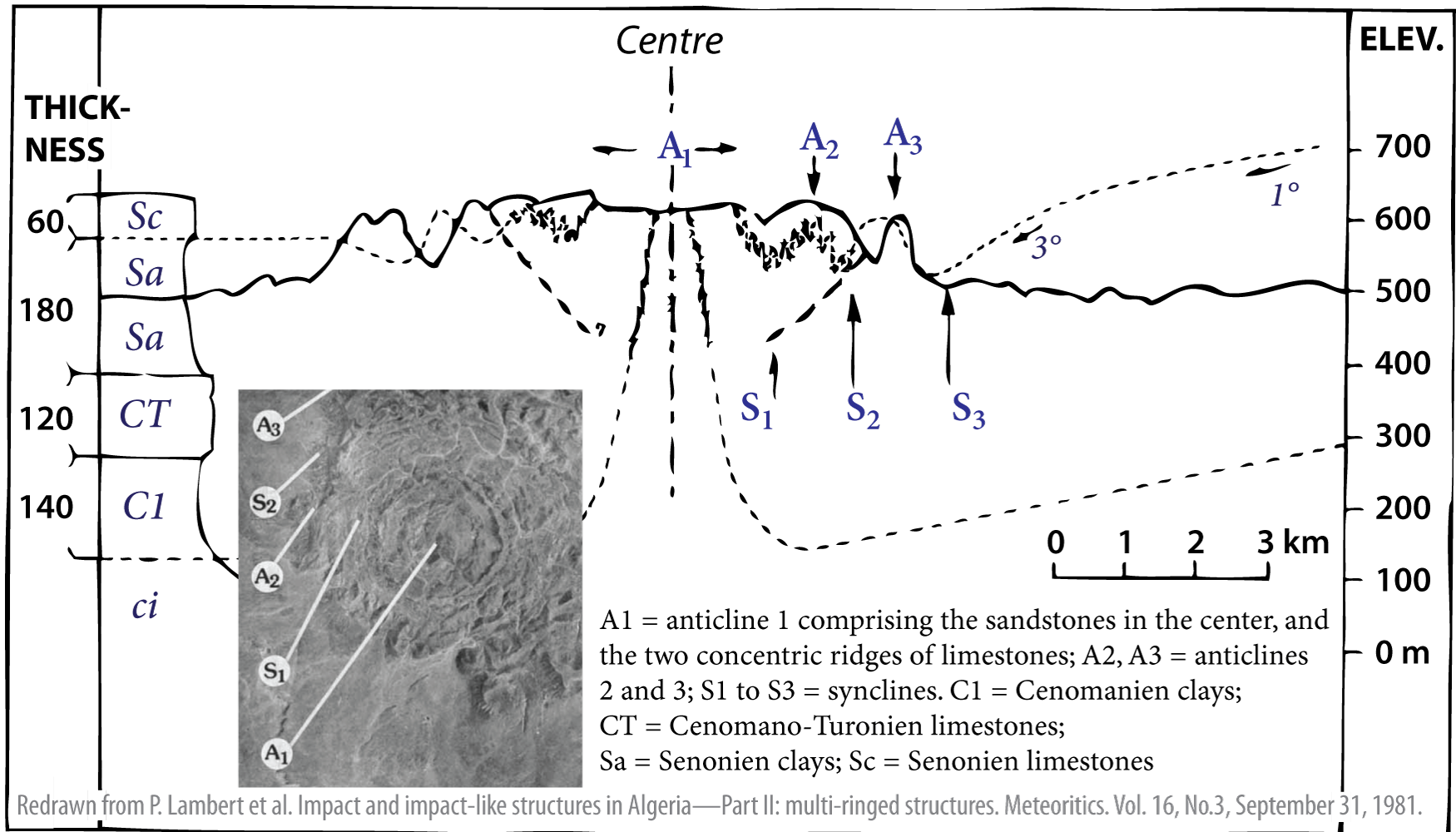
Cross-section of Tin Bider impact structure

== See also ==
- List of impact craters in Africa
