= Kalkkop crater =

Impact crater in South Africa

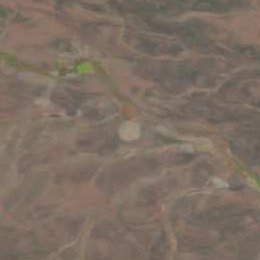
- Landsat image with Kalkkop at center

- Location within South Africa
- Location: Aberdeen, Eastern Cape, Eastern Cape Province, South Africa; 32°42′29″S 24°25′56″E

Impact crater structure
- Confidence: Confirmed
- Diameter: 0.64 kilometres (0.40 mi)
- Age: 0.25 ± 0.05 Ma
- Exposed: Yes
- Drilled: Yes

Kalkkop is an impact crater which can be found on a private farm 50 kilometres (31 mi) south east of the town of Aberdeen, Eastern Cape, in the Eastern Cape Province of South Africa. The name is derived from two Afrikaans words, namely "kalk" meaning limestone and "kop" meaning head.

The meteorite impact occurred about 250,000 years ago (Pleistocene) on what is now the flat Karoo landscape. It left a crater 640 metres in diameter and a few hundred metres deep. Over time, draining water left a limestone deposit 88 metres deep. This lies over a breccia layer a further 210 metres deep. Only a weathered circular ridge is still visible at the surface.

In 1992, a deep corehole was drilled to a depth of 151.8 m in the crater. A breccia sample from the core had an elevated Osmium content and low Os^{187}Os^{188} ratio of 0.215, which is considered to be closer to meteoritic composition than typical crust of the Earth.

This is one of four confirmed impact sites in South Africa and six within the Southern African region.
