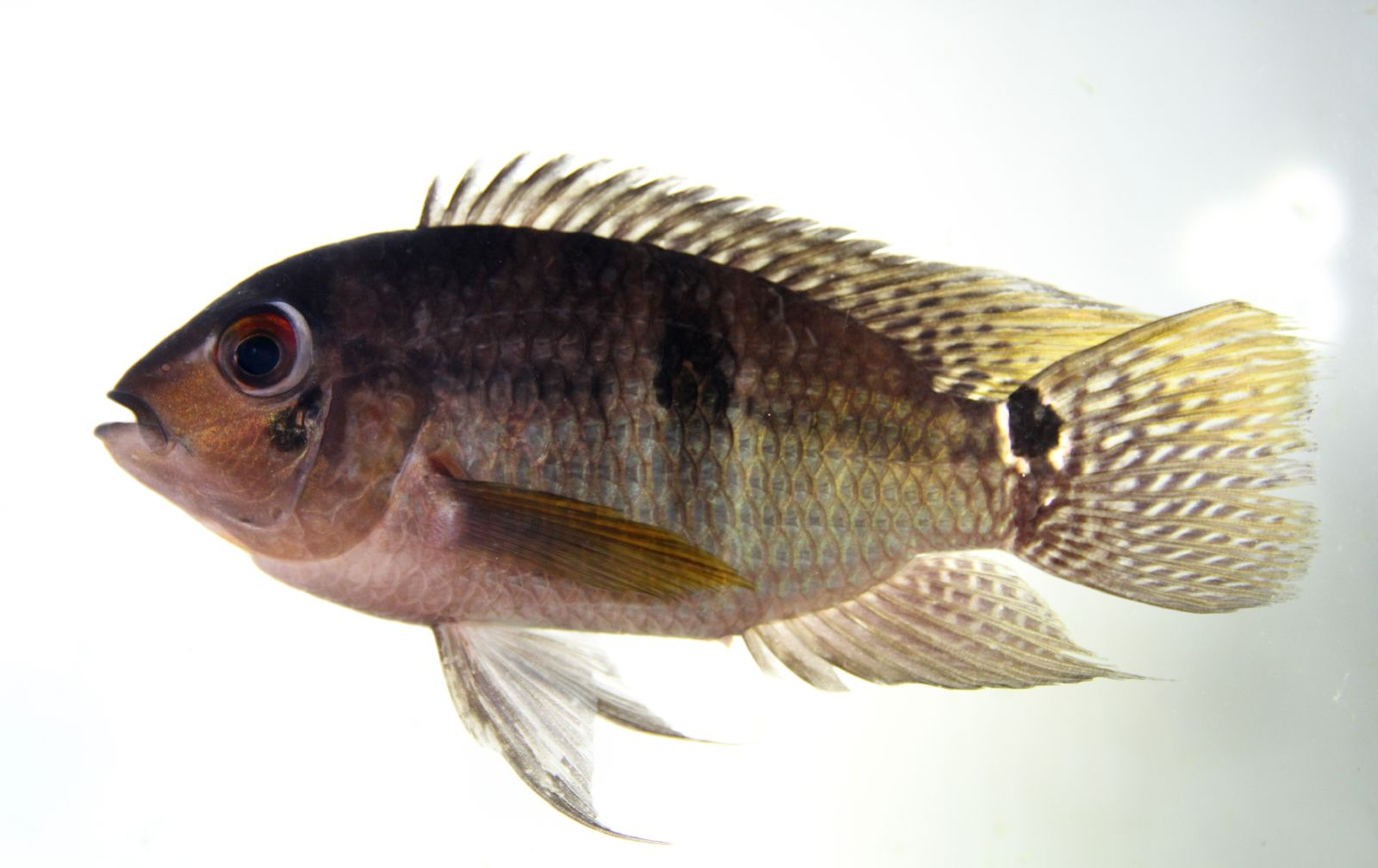
- Aequidens tetramerus

Scientific classification
- Kingdom: Animalia
- Phylum: Chordata
- Class: Actinopterygii
- Division: Teleostei
- Order: Cichliformes
- Family: Cichlidae
- Subfamily: Cichlinae
- Tribe: Cichlasomatini
- Genus: Aequidens; C. H. Eigenmann & W. L. Bray, 1894

Type species
- Acara tetramerus Heckel, 1840

= Aequidens =

Genus of fishes

Aequidens is a genus of fish in the family Cichlidae found in South America. Formerly a wastebasket genus, as presently defined Aequidens is largely restricted to the Amazon Basin, Orinoco Basin and river basins in The Guianas. The only exceptions are A. plagiozonatus which also occurs in the Paraná Basin, and A. tetramerus which also occurs in the Parnaíba River.

== Taxonomy ==
Many species formerly placed in this genus have been reallocated to other genera such as Andinoacara, Bujurquina, Cleithracara, Krobia, Laetacara, Rondonacara and Tahuantinsuyoa.

=== Species ===
There are currently 18 recognized species in this genus:

- Aequidens chimantanus Inger, 1956
- Aequidens diadema (Heckel, 1840)
- Aequidens epae S. O. Kullander, 1995
- Aequidens gerciliae S. O. Kullander, 1995
- Aequidens mauesanus S. O. Kullander, 1997
- Aequidens metae C. H. Eigenmann, 1922
- Aequidens michaeli S. O. Kullander, 1995
- Aequidens pallidus (Heckel, 1840) (Doublespot acara)
- Aequidens paloemeuensis S. O. Kullander & Nijssen, 1989
- Aequidens patricki S. O. Kullander, 1984
- Aequidens plagiozonatus S. O. Kullander, 1984
- Aequidens pirilampo Oliveira et al., 2024
- Aequidens potaroensis C. H. Eigenmann, 1912
- Aequidens rondoni (A. Miranda-Ribeiro, 1918)
- Aequidens superomaculatum Hernández-Acevedo, Machado-Allison & Lasso A., 2015
- Aequidens tetramerus (Heckel, 1840) (Saddle cichlid)
- Aequidens tubicen S. O. Kullander & E. J. G. Ferreira, 1991
- Aequidens viridis (Heckel, 1840)
