= List of impact structures in South America =

World map in equirectangular projection of the impact structures on the Earth Impact Database as of November 2017 (in the SVG file, hover over a structure to show its details)

This list includes all 11 confirmed impact structures in South America as listed in the Earth Impact Database. These features were caused by the collision of large meteorites or comets with the Earth. For eroded or buried craters, the stated diameter typically refers to an estimate of original rim diameter, and may not correspond to present surface features.

== Confirmed impact structures ==
Locations of confirmed and probable impact craters in South America, maximum ages:
Quaternary
Cenozoic
Mesozoic
Paleozoic

Name	Location	Diameter	Age (years)	Coordinates
Araguainha	Brazil	40 km	244.40 ± 3.25 million	16°47′S 52°59′W
Campo del Cielo	Argentina	0.05 km	< 4000	27°38′S 61°42′W
Carancas	Peru	0.0135 km	18	16°40′S 69°03′W
Colônia	Brazil	3.6 km	>5 million, <36 million	23°52′S 46°42′W
Monturaqui	Chile	0.46 km	< 1 million	23°56′S 68°16′W
Riachão Ring	Brazil	4.5 km	< 200 million	7°43′S 46°39′W
Rio Cuarto	Argentina	4.5 km (largest of 10)	< 100,000	32°53′S 64°14′W
Santa Marta	Brazil	10 km	66 million - 100 million	10°10′S 45°15′W
Serra da Cangalha	Brazil	12 km	< 300 million	8°5′S 46°52′W
Vargeão Dome	Brazil	12 km	< 70 million	26°50′S 52°7′W
Vista Alegre	Brazil	9.5 km	< 65 million	25°57′S 52°41′W

== Unconfirmed impact structures ==
The following structures are officially considered "unconfirmed" because they are not listed in the Earth Impact Database. Due to stringent requirements regarding evidence and peer-reviewed publication, newly discovered craters or those with difficulty collecting evidence generally are known for some time before becoming listed. However, entries on the unconfirmed list could still have an impact origin disproven.

Name	Location	Diameter	Age	Coordinates
Cerro do Jarau crater	Brazil	10 km (6.2 mi)	?	30°12′S 56°32′W
Iturralde	Bolivia	8 km (5.0 mi)	11–30 thousand	12°35′S 67°40′W
Piratininga crater	Paraná Basin, Brazil	12 km (7.5 mi)	117 million	22°28′12″S 49°09′00″W
Praia Grande	Santos Basin, Brazil	20 km (12 mi)	84 million	25°39′S 45°37′W
Vichada Structure	Colombia	50 km (31 mi)	30 million	4°30′N 69°15′W

== See also ==
- Impact craters
- Impact events
- Bolides and Meteorites
- Earth Impact Database – primary source
- Traces of Catastrophe book from Lunar and Planetary Institute - comprehensive reference on impact crater science
