= Arsenic poisoning =

Illness from ingesting arsenic

- Other names: Arsenicosis
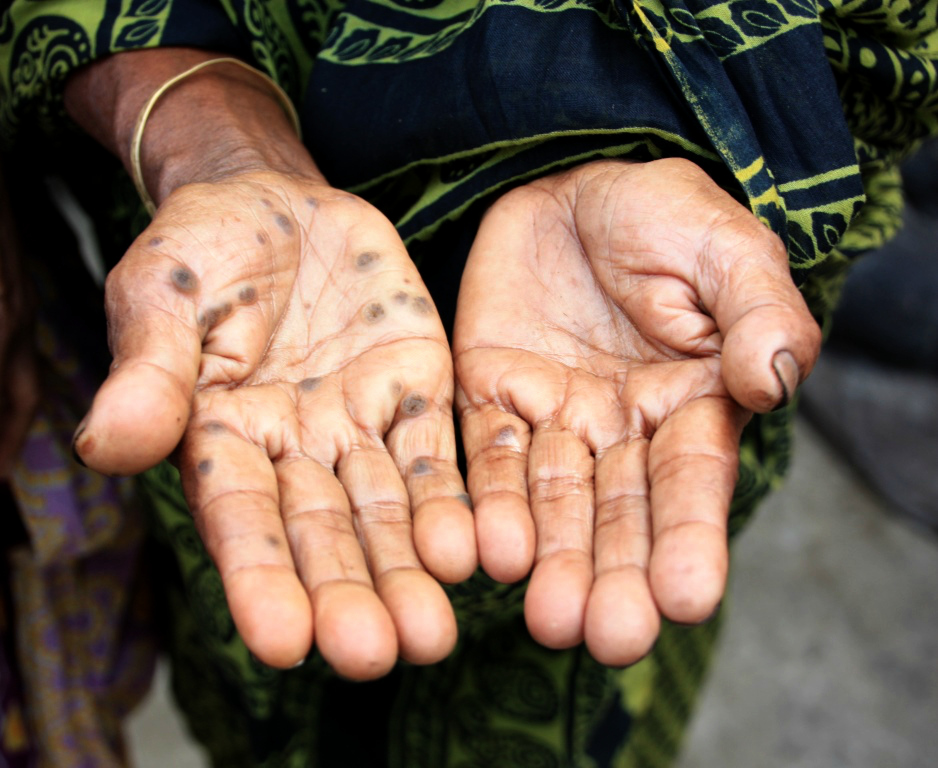
- A person displaying hyperpigmentation due to arsenic poisoning from contaminated water
- Specialty: Toxicology
- Symptoms: Acute: vomiting, abdominal pain, watery diarrhea Chronic: thickened skin, darker skin, cancer
- Causes: Arsenic
- Diagnostic method: Urine, blood, or hair testing
- Prevention: Drinking water without arsenic
- Treatment: Dimercaptosuccinic acid, dimercaptopropane sulfonate
- Frequency: >200 million

Arsenic poisoning (or arsenicosis) is a medical condition that occurs due to elevated levels of arsenic in the body. If arsenic poisoning occurs over a brief period, symptoms may include vomiting, abdominal pain, encephalopathy, and watery diarrhea that contains blood. Long-term exposure can result in thickening of the skin, darker skin, abdominal pain, diarrhea, heart disease, numbness, and cancer.

The most common reason for long-term exposure is contaminated drinking water. Groundwater most often becomes contaminated naturally; however, contamination may also occur from mining or agriculture. It may also be found in the soil and air. Recommended levels in water are less than 10–50 μg/L (10–50 parts per billion). Other routes of exposure include toxic waste sites and pseudo-medicine. Most cases of poisoning are accidental.

For acute poisonings treating dehydration is important. Dimercaptosuccinic acid or dimercaptopropane sulfonate may be used; but dimercaprol (BAL) is not recommended, because it tends to increase uptake of other co-occurring toxic heavy metals. Hemodialysis may also be used.

Through drinking water, more than 200 million people globally are exposed to higher-than-safe levels of arsenic. The areas most affected are Bangladesh and West Bengal. Exposure is also more common in people of low income and minorities. Acute poisoning is uncommon. The toxicity of arsenic has been described as far back as 1500 BC in the Ebers papyrus.

== Signs and symptoms ==
Ingesting large amounts of arsenic can cause symptoms similar to food poisoning, with abdominal pain, nausea, vomiting, and diarrhea, which can lead to severe dehydration and resultant hypovolemic shock.

Chronic exposure can eventually cause disease across multiple body systems, including peripheral neuropathy (numbness and tingling), enlargement of the liver and spleen, diabetes, heart disease, cognitive impairment, and damage to the portal vein (non-cirrhotic portal fibrosis and portal hypertension).

There may also be cardiovascular effects such as QT interval prolongation, tachycardia or heart failure which may result in death.

Arsenic is a neurotoxin capable of crossing the blood-brain barrier and accumulating in the brain and, as such, neurological complications are often present which may include seizures, comatose state, and severely reduced cognitive functioning.

Chronic ingestion of lower levels of arsenic often causes hyperpigmentation and/or, sometimes hypopigmentation. Some exposed individuals experience thickening of the skin on the palms and soles of the feet, which may be generalised or local or banding of the fingernails, referred to as Mees' lines.

Arsenic exposure increases the risk for developing several cancers, particularly of the lung, liver, bladder, prostate, blood vessels and skin, the most common of which is squamous cell carcinoma which may present years after exposure.

Inhaling arsine gas – the most toxic form of arsenic – causes a multisystem disease starting 2 to 24 hours after inhalation. Symptoms include gastrointestinal distress, headache, weakness, difficulty breathing, kidney and liver dysfunction.

== Causes ==
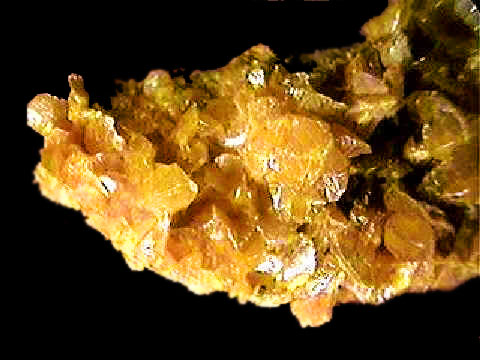
Orpiment, a toxic arsenic mineral used in the tanning industry to remove hair from hides.

Arsenic poisoning is caused by incidental ingestion, inhalation or skin-contact with arsenic or arsenic containing compounds. This commonly occurs through the use of arsenic-contaminated groundwater or exposure to arsenic-containing pesticides, use of supplements, or work involving the use of industrial chemicals.

=== Rice and seafood ===
It's estimated that an average adult in the United States consumes 3.2 μg/day of arsenic, with a range of 1–20 μg/day. Estimates for children were similar.

Food also contains many organic arsenic compounds. A wide range of arsenic containing compounds have been found in food, although arsenic compounds may range significantly in toxicity. Seafood is a common source of organic arsenic in the form of arsenobetaine. There is evidence indicating that arsenocholine, which can be found in some food sources, is non-toxic. Arsenosugars are present in some forms of seafood and been shown through in vitro studies to be significantly less toxic than both inorganic arsenic and trivalent methylated arsenic metabolites.

It has been found that rice is particularly susceptible to the accumulation of arsenic from soil. Rice grown in the United States has an average 260 ppb of arsenic, but U.S. arsenic intake remains far below World Health Organization-recommended limits. China has set a standard for arsenic limits in food (150 ppb), as levels in rice exceed those in water.

=== Air ===
The European Commission (2000) reports that levels of arsenic in air range 0–1 ng/m^{3} in remote areas, 0.2–1.5 ng/m^{3} in rural areas, 0.5–3 ng/m^{3} in urban areas, and up to about 50 ng/m^{3} in the vicinity of industrial sites. Based on these data, the European Commission (2000) estimated that in relation to food, cigarette smoking, water, and soil, air contributes less than 1% of total arsenic exposure.

=== Pesticides ===
Although the use of lead arsenic-containing pesticides has long been stopped, large areas of land remain contaminated.

Some arsenic-based pesticides still exist. Chromated copper arsenate has been registered for use in the United States since the 1940s as a wood preservative, protecting wood from insects and microbial agents. In 2003, manufacturers of chromated copper arsenate initiated a voluntary recall of residential wood treated with the chemical. The Environmental Protection Agency Act 2008 final report stated that chromated copper arsenate is still approved for use in nonresidential applications, such as in marine facilities (pilings and structures), utility poles, and sand highway structures.

=== Copper smelting ===
Exposure studies in the copper smelting industry are much more extensive and have established definitive links between arsenic, a by-product of copper smelting, and lung cancer via inhalation. Dermal and neurological effects were also increased in some of these studies. Although further occupational controls were introduced and workers were exposed to lower arsenic concentrations, the arsenic exposures measured in these studies range from about 0.05 to 0.3 mg/m^{3}, significantly higher than usual airborne levels, ranging from 0 to 0.000003 mg/m^{3}).

== Pathophysiology ==
Arsenic interferes with cellular longevity by allosteric inhibition of an essential metabolic enzyme pyruvate dehydrogenase complex, which catalyzes the oxidation of pyruvate to acetyl-CoA by NAD^{+}. With the enzyme inhibited, the energy system of the cell is disrupted resulting in cellular apoptosis. Biochemically, arsenic prevents the use of thiamine resulting in a clinical picture resembling thiamine deficiency. Poisoning with arsenic can raise lactate levels and lead to lactic acidosis. Low potassium levels in the cells increase the risk of experiencing a life-threatening heart rhythm problem from arsenic trioxide. Arsenic in cells clearly stimulates the production of hydrogen peroxide (H_{2}O_{2}). When the H_{2}O_{2} reacts with certain metals such as iron or manganese, it produces a highly reactive hydroxyl radical. Inorganic arsenic trioxide found in ground water particularly affects voltage-gated potassium channels, disrupting cellular electrolytic function resulting in neurological disturbances, cardiovascular episodes such as prolonged QT interval, neutropenia, high blood pressure, central nervous system dysfunction, anemia, and death.

Arsenic exposure plays a key role in the pathogenesis of vascular endothelial dysfunction as it inactivates endothelial nitric oxide synthase, leading to a reduction in the generation and bioavailability of nitric oxide. In addition, chronic arsenic exposure induces high oxidative stress, which may affect the structure and function of the cardiovascular system. Further, the arsenic exposure has been noted to induce atherosclerosis by increasing the platelet aggregation and reducing fibrinolysis. Moreover, arsenic exposure may cause arrhythmia by increasing the QT interval and accelerating the cellular calcium overload. The chronic exposure to arsenic upregulates the expression of tumor necrosis factor-α, interleukin-1, vascular cell adhesion molecule and vascular endothelial growth factor to induce cardiovascular pathogenesis.

— Pitchai Balakumar and Jagdeep Kaur, "Arsenic Exposure and Cardiovascular Disorders: An Overview", Cardiovascular Toxicology, December 2009

Arsenic has also been shown to induce cardiac hypertrophy by activating certain transcription factors involved in pathologically remodeling the heart. Tissue culture studies have shown that arsenic compounds block both IKr and Iks channels and, at the same time, activate IK-ATP channels. Arsenic compounds also disrupt ATP production through several mechanisms. At the level of the citric acid cycle, arsenic inhibits pyruvate dehydrogenase and by competing with phosphate it uncouples oxidative phosphorylation, thus inhibiting energy-linked reduction of NAD+, mitochondrial respiration, and ATP synthesis. Hydrogen peroxide production is also increased, which might form reactive oxygen species and oxidative stress. These metabolic interferences lead to death from multi-system organ failure, probably from necrotic cell death, not apoptosis. A post mortem reveals brick red colored mucosa, due to severe hemorrhage. Although arsenic causes toxicity, it can also play a protective role.

=== Mechanism ===
Arsenite inhibits not only the formation of acetyl-CoA but also the enzyme succinic dehydrogenase. Arsenate can replace phosphate in many reactions. It can form Glc-6-arsenate in vitro; therefore, it has been argued that hexokinase could be inhibited. (Eventually this may be a mechanism leading to muscle weakness in chronic arsenic poisoning.) In the glyceraldehyde 3-phosphate dehydrogenase reaction arsenate attacks the enzyme-bound thioester. The formed 1-arseno-3-phosphoglycerate is unstable and hydrolyzes spontaneously. Thus, ATP formation in glycolysis is inhibited while bypassing the phosphoglycerate kinase reaction. (Moreover, the formation of 2,3-bisphosphoglycerate in erythrocytes might be affected, followed by a higher oxygen affinity of hemoglobin and subsequently enhanced cyanosis.) As shown by Gresser (1981), submitochondrial particles synthesize adenosine-5'-diphosphate-arsenate from ADP and arsenate in presence of succinate. Thus, by a variety of mechanisms, arsenate leads to an impairment of cell respiration and subsequently diminished ATP formation. This is consistent with observed ATP depletion of exposed cells and histopathological findings of mitochondrial and cell swelling, glycogen depletion in liver cells and fatty change in liver, heart and kidney.

Experiments demonstrated enhanced arterial thrombosis in a rat animal model, elevations of serotonin levels, thromboxane A[2], and adhesion proteins in platelets, while human platelets showed similar responses. The effect on vascular endothelium may eventually be mediated by the arsenic-induced formation of nitric oxide. It was demonstrated that +3 As concentrations substantially lower than concentrations required for inhibition of the lysosomal protease cathepsin L in the B cell line TA3 were sufficient to trigger apoptosis in the same B cell line, while the latter could be a mechanism mediating immunosuppressive effects.

Its comutagenic effects may be explained by interference with base and nucleotide excision repair, eventually through interaction with zinc finger structures. Dimethylarsinic acid, DMA(V), caused DNA single strand breaks resulting from inhibition of repair enzymes at levels of 5 to 100 mM in human epithelial type II cells.

MMA(III) and DMA(III) were also shown to be directly genotoxic by effectuating scissions in supercoiled ΦX174 DNA. Increased arsenic exposure is associated with an increased frequency of chromosomal aberrations, micronuclei and sister-chromatid exchanges. An explanation for chromosomal aberrations is the sensitivity of the protein tubulin and the mitotic spindle to arsenic. Histological observations confirm effects on cellular integrity, shape and locomotion.

DMA(III) can form reactive oxygen species by reaction with molecular oxygen. Resulting metabolites are the dimethylarsenic radical and the dimethylarsenic peroxyl radical. Both DMA(III) and DMA(V) were shown to release iron from horse spleen as well as from human liver ferritin if ascorbic acid was administered simultaneously. Thus, the formation of reactive oxygen species can be promoted. Moreover, arsenic could cause oxidative stress by depleting the cell's antioxidants, especially those containing thiol groups. The accumulation of reactive oxygen species like that cited above and hydroxyl radicals, superoxide radicals, and hydrogen peroxides causes aberrant gene expression at low concentrations and lesions of lipids, proteins, and DNA in higher concentrations, which eventually lead to cellular death. In a rat animal model, urine levels of 8-hydroxy-2'-deoxyguanosine (as a biomarker of DNA damage by reactive oxygen species) were measured after treatment with DMA(V). In comparison to control levels, they turned out to be significantly increased. This theory is further supported by a cross-sectional study which found elevated mean serum lipid peroxides in the As exposed individuals which correlated with blood levels of inorganic arsenic and methylated metabolites and inversely correlated with nonprotein sulfhydryl (NPSH) levels in whole blood.

Another study found an association of As levels in whole blood with the level of reactive oxidants in plasma and an inverse relationship with plasma antioxidants. A finding of the latter study indicates that methylation might in fact be a detoxification pathway with regard to oxidative stress: the results showed that the lower the As methylation capacity was, the lower the level of plasma antioxidant capacity. As reviewed by Kitchin (2001), the oxidative stress theory explains the preferred tumor sites connected with arsenic exposure. Considering that a high partial pressure of oxygen is present in lungs and DMA(III) is excreted in gaseous state via the lungs, this seems to be a plausible mechanism for special vulnerability. The fact that DMA is produced by methylation in the liver, excreted via the kidneys, and later on stored in the bladder accounts for the other tumor localizations.

Regarding DNA methylation, some studies suggest interaction of As with methyltransferases, which leads to an inactivation of tumor suppressor genes through hypermethylation; others state that hypomethylation might occur due to a lack of SAM, resulting in aberrant gene activation. An experiment by Zhong et al. (2001) with arsenite-exposed human lung A549, kidney UOK123, UOK109 and UOK121 cells isolated eight different DNA fragments by methylation-sensitive arbitrarily primed polymerase chain reactions. It turned out that six of the fragments were hyper- and two of them were hypomethylated. Higher levels of DNA methyltransferase mRNA and enzyme activity were found.

Kitchin (2001) proposed a model of altered growth factors, which lead to cell proliferation and thus to carcinogenesis. From observations, it is known that chronic low-dose arsenic poisoning can lead to increased tolerance to its acute toxicity. MRP1-overexpressing lung tumor GLC4/Sb30 cells poorly accumulate arsenite and arsenate. This is mediated through MRP-1-dependent efflux. The efflux requires glutathione, but no arsenic-glutathione complex formation.

Although many mechanisms have been proposed, no definite model accounts for the mechanisms of chronic arsenic poisoning. The prevailing events of toxicity and carcinogenicity might be quite tissue-specific. The consensus on the mode of carcinogenesis is that it acts primarily as a tumor promoter. Its co-carcinogenicity has been demonstrated in several models. However, the finding of several studies that chronically arsenic-exposed Andean populations (as most extremely exposed to UV-light) do not develop skin cancer with chronic arsenic exposure, is puzzling.

=== Kinetics ===
The two forms of inorganic arsenic, reduced (trivalent As(III)) and oxidized (pentavalent As(V)), can be absorbed and accumulated in tissues and body fluids. In the liver, the metabolism of arsenic involves enzymatic and non-enzymatic methylation; the most frequently excreted metabolite (≥ 90%) in the urine of mammals is dimethylarsinic acid or cacodylic acid, DMA(V). Dimethylarsenic acid is also known as Agent Blue and was used as herbicide in the American war in Vietnam.

In humans, inorganic arsenic is reduced nonenzymatically from pentoxide to trioxide, using glutathione, or it is mediated by enzymes. Reduction of arsenic pentoxide to arsenic trioxide increases its toxicity and bioavailability. Methylation occurs through methyltransferase enzymes. S-adenosylmethionine (SAM) may serve as a methyl donor. Various pathways are used, the principal route being dependent on the cellular environment. Resulting metabolites are monomethylarsonous acid, MMA(III), and dimethylarsinous acid, DMA(III).

Methylation had been regarded as a detoxification process, but reduction from +5 As to +3 As may be considered as a bioactivation instead. Another suggestion is that methylation might be a detoxification if "As[III] intermediates are not permitted to accumulate" because the pentavalent organoarsenics have a lower affinity to thiol groups than inorganic pentavalent arsenics. Gebel (2002) stated that methylation is a detoxification through accelerated excretion. With regard to carcinogenicity it has been suggested that methylation should be regarded as a toxification.

Arsenic, especially +3 As, binds to single, but with higher affinity to vicinal sulfhydryl groups, thus reacting with a variety of proteins and inhibiting their activity. It was also proposed that binding of arsenite at nonessential sites might contribute to detoxification. Arsenite inhibits members of the disulfide oxidoreductase family like glutathione reductase and thioredoxin reductase.

The remaining unbound arsenic (≤ 10%) accumulates in cells, which over time may lead to skin, bladder, kidney, liver, lung, and prostate cancers. Other forms of arsenic toxicity in humans have been observed in blood, bone marrow, cardiac, central nervous system, gastrointestinal, gonadal, kidney, liver, pancreatic, and skin tissues.

The acute minimal lethal dose of arsenic in adults is estimated to be 70 to 200 mg or 1 mg/kg/day.

=== Heat shock response ===
Another aspect is the similarity of arsenic effects to the heat shock response. Short-term arsenic exposure has effects on signal transduction inducing heat shock proteins with masses of 27, 60, 70, 72, 90, and 110 kDa as well as metallothionein, ubiquitin, mitogen-activated [MAP] kinases, extracellular regulated kinase [ERK], c-jun terminal kinases [JNK] and p38. Via JNK and p38 it activates c-fos, c-jun and egr-1 which are usually activated by growth factors and cytokines. The effects are largely dependent on the dosing regime and may be as well inversed.

As shown by some experiments reviewed by Del Razo (2001), reactive oxygen species induced by low levels of inorganic arsenic increase the transcription and the activity of the activator protein 1 (AP-1) and the nuclear factor-κB (NF-κB) (maybe enhanced by elevated MAPK levels), which results in c-fos/c-jun activation, over-secretion of pro-inflammatory and growth promoting cytokines stimulating cell proliferation. Germolec et al. (1996) found an increased cytokine expression and cell proliferation in skin biopsies from individuals chronically exposed to arsenic-contaminated drinking water.

Increased AP-1 and NF-κB obviously also result in an up-regulation of mdm2 protein, which decreases p53 protein levels. Thus, taking into account p53's function, a lack of it could cause a faster accumulation of mutations contributing to carcinogenesis. However, high levels of inorganic arsenic inhibit NF-κB activation and cell proliferation. An experiment of Hu et al. (2002) demonstrated increased binding activity of AP-1 and NF-κB after acute (24 h) exposure to +3 sodium arsenite, whereas long-term exposure (10–12 weeks) yielded the opposite result. The authors conclude that the former may be interpreted as a defense response while the latter could lead to carcinogenesis. As the contradicting findings and connected mechanistic hypotheses indicate, there is a difference in acute and chronic effects of arsenic on signal transduction, which is not clearly understood yet.

=== Oxidative stress ===
Studies have demonstrated that the oxidative stress generated by arsenic may disrupt the signal transduction pathways of the nuclear transcriptional factors PPARs, AP-1, and NF-κB, as well as the pro-inflammatory cytokines IL-8 and TNF-α. The interference of oxidative stress with signal transduction pathways may affect physiological processes associated with cell growth, metabolic syndrome X, glucose homeostasis, lipid metabolism, obesity, insulin resistance, inflammation, and diabetes-2. Recent scientific evidence has elucidated the physiological roles of the PPARs in the ω- hydroxylation of fatty acids and the inhibition of pro-inflammatory transcription factors (NF-κB and AP-1), pro-inflammatory cytokines (IL-1, −6, −8, −12, and TNF-α), cell4 adhesion molecules (ICAM-1 and VCAM-1), inducible nitric oxide synthase, proinflammatory nitric oxide (NO), and anti-apoptotic factors.

Epidemiological studies have suggested a correlation between chronic consumption of drinking water contaminated with arsenic and the incidence of type 2 diabetes. The human liver after exposure to therapeutic drugs may exhibit hepatic non-cirrhotic portal hypertension, fibrosis, and cirrhosis. However, the literature provides insufficient scientific evidence to show cause and effect between arsenic and the onset of diabetes mellitus Type 2.

== Diagnosis ==
Arsenic may be measured in blood or urine to monitor excessive environmental or occupational exposure, confirm a diagnosis of poisoning in hospitalized victims or to assist in the forensic investigation in a case of fatal overdose. Some analytical techniques are capable of distinguishing organic from inorganic forms of the element. Organic arsenic compounds tend to be eliminated in the urine in unchanged form, while inorganic forms are largely converted to organic arsenic compounds in the body before urinary excretion. The biological exposure index for U.S. workers of 35 μg/L total urinary arsenic may easily be exceeded by a healthy person eating a seafood meal.

Tests are available to diagnose poisoning by measuring arsenic in blood, urine, hair, and fingernails. The urine test is the most reliable test for arsenic exposure within the last few days. Urine testing needs to be done within 24–48 hours for an accurate analysis of an acute exposure. Tests on hair and fingernails can measure exposure to high levels of arsenic over the past 6–12 months. These tests can determine if one has been exposed to above-average levels of arsenic. They cannot predict, however, whether the arsenic levels in the body will affect health. Chronic arsenic exposure can remain in the body systems for a longer period than a shorter term or more isolated exposure and can be detected in a longer time frame after the introduction of the arsenic, important in trying to determine the source of the exposure.

Hair is a potential bioindicator for arsenic exposure due to its ability to store trace elements from blood. Incorporated elements maintain their position during the growth of hair. Thus, for a temporal estimation of exposure, an assay of hair composition needs to be carried out with a single hair, which is not possible with older techniques requiring homogenization and dissolution of several strands of hair. This type of biomonitoring has been achieved with newer microanalytical techniques like synchrotron radiation-based X-ray fluorescence spectroscopy and microparticle-induced X-ray emission. The highly focused and intense beams study small spots on biological samples, allowing analysis at the micro level along with chemical speciation. In a study, this method has been used to follow arsenic levels before, during, and after treatment with arsenious oxide in patients with acute promyelocytic leukemia.

== Treatment ==
=== Chelation ===
Dimercaprol and dimercaptosuccinic acid (succimer) are chelating agents that sequester the arsenic away from blood proteins and are used in treating acute arsenic poisoning. The most important side effect is hypertension. Dimercaprol is considerably more toxic than succimer. Dimercaptosuccinic acid monoesters, e.g., MiADMSA, are promising antidotes for arsenic poisoning.

== History ==
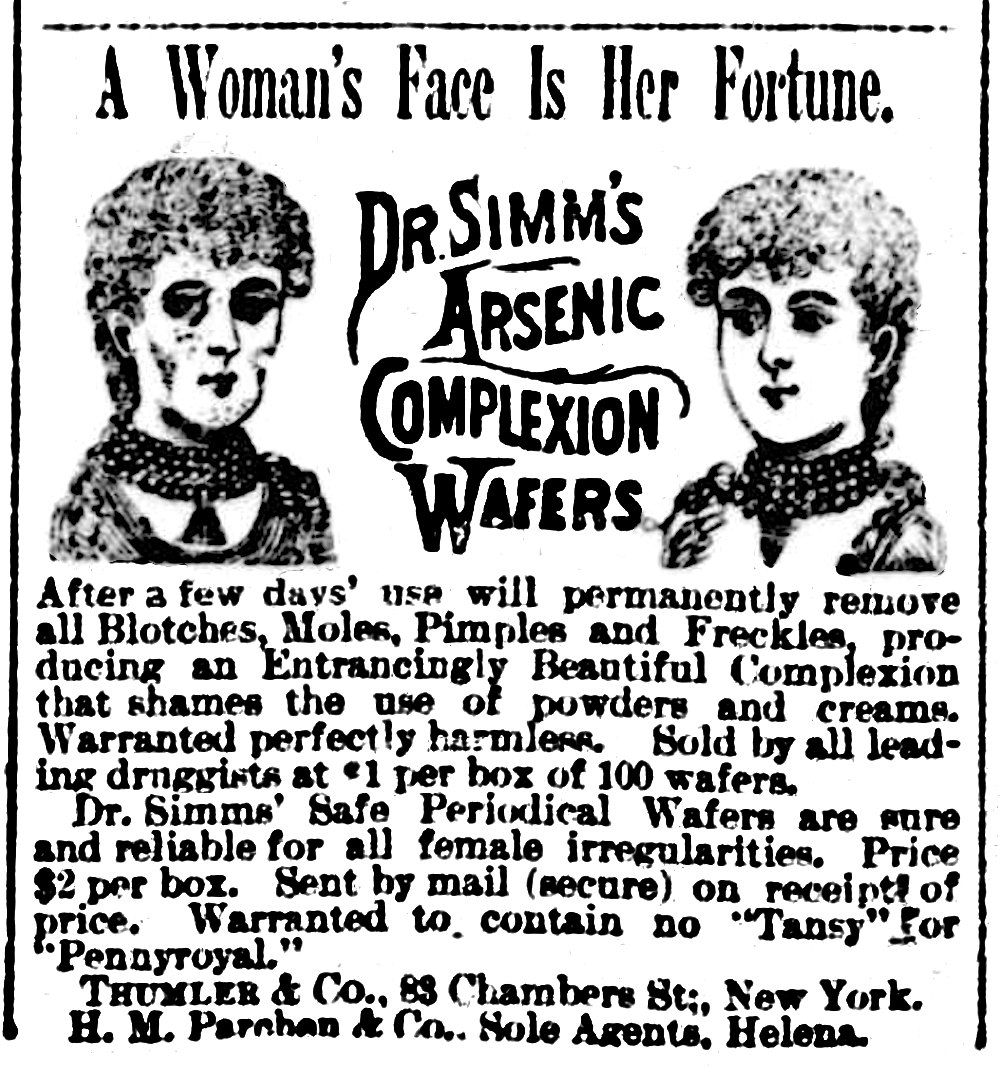
An 1889 newspaper advertisement for "arsenic complexion wafers". Arsenic was known to be poisonous during the Victorian era.

Beginning in about 3000 BC, arsenic was mined and added to copper in the alloying of bronze, but the adverse health effects of working with arsenic led to it being abandoned when a viable alternative, tin, was discovered.

During the Elizabethan era, some women used toxic makeup composed of vinegar, chalk, and arsenic applied topically to whiten their skin. This use of arsenic was intended to prevent aging and creasing of the skin, but some arsenic was inevitably absorbed into the bloodstream. During the Victorian era (late 19th century) in the United States, U.S. newspapers advertised "arsenic complexion wafers" that promised to remove facial blemishes such as moles and pimples.

Some pigments, most notably the popular Emerald Green (known also under several other names), were based on arsenic compounds. Overexposure to these pigments was a frequent cause of accidental poisoning of artists and craftsmen.

Arsenic became a favored method for murder of the Middle Ages and Renaissance, particularly among the ruling classes in Italy, allegedly. Because the symptoms are similar to those of cholera, which was common at the time, arsenic poisoning often went undetected. By the 19th century, it had acquired the nickname "inheritance powder", perhaps because impatient heirs were known or suspected to use it to ensure or accelerate their inheritances. It was also a common murder technique in the 19th century in domestic violence situations, such as the case of Rebecca Copin, who attempted to poison her husband by "putting arsenic in his coffee".

In post-WW1 Hungary, arsenic extracted by boiling fly paper was used in an estimated 300 murders by the Angel Makers of Nagyrév.

In imperial China, arsenic trioxide and sulfides were used in murder, as well as for capital punishment for members of the royal family or aristocracy. Forensic studies have determined that the Guangxu Emperor (d. 1908) was murdered by arsenic, most likely ordered by the Empress Dowager Cixi or Generalissimo Yuan Shikai. Likewise, in ancient Korea, and particularly in the Joseon Dynasty, arsenic-sulfur compounds had been used as a major ingredient of sayak (사약; 賜藥), which was a poison cocktail used in capital punishment of high-profile political figures and members of the royal family. Due to social and political prominence of the condemned, many of these events were well-documented, often in the Annals of Joseon Dynasty; they are sometimes portrayed in historical television miniseries because of their dramatic nature.

Arsenic-contaminated beer poisoned over 6,000 people in the Manchester area of England in 1900, and is thought to have killed at least 70 victims.

Mass arsenic poisoning due to naturally occurring arsenic in drinking water was first noted by Dr. Abel Ayerza in Córdoba, Argentina in a paper published in 1918. One of the worst incidents of arsenic poisoning via well water occurred in Bangladesh with the mass installation of tube wells following Bangladesh's independence in 1971. The World Health Organization called this the "largest mass poisoning of a population in history" and was recognized as a major public health concern. The contamination in the Ganga-Brahmaputra fluvial plains in India and Padma-Meghna fluvial plains in Bangladesh demonstrated adverse impacts on human health.

Clare Luce, American ambassador to Italy from 1953 to 1956, suffered from arsenic poisoning. Its source was traced to flaking arsenic-laden paint on the ceiling of her bedroom. She may also have eaten food contaminated by arsenic in flaking ceiling paint in the embassy dining room.

Arsenic poisoning from exposure to groundwater is believed to be responsible for the illness experienced by those that witnessed the 2007 Carancas impact event in Peru, as local residents inhaled steam which was contaminated with arsenic, produced from groundwater which boiled from the intense heat and pressure produced by a chondrite meteorite impacting the ground. Ground water contaminated by arsenic, as of 2014, "is still poisoning millions of people in Asia".

== Legislation ==
In the U.S. in 1975, under the authority of the Safe Drinking Water Act, the U.S. Environmental Protection Agency determined the National Interim Primary Drinking Water Regulation levels of arsenic (inorganic contaminant – IOCs) to be 0.05 mg/L (50 parts per billion – ppb).

Throughout the years, many studies have reported dose-dependent effects of arsenic in drinking water and skin cancer. In order to prevent new cases and deaths from cancerous and non-cancerous diseases, the Safe Drinking Water Act directed the Environmental Protection Agency to revise arsenic levels and specify the maximum contaminant level (MCL). MCLs are set as close to the health goals as possible, considering cost, benefits, and the ability of public water systems to detect and remove contaminants using suitable treatment technologies.

In 2001, the Environmental Protection Agency adopted a lower standard of MCL 0.01 mg/L (10 ppb) for arsenic in drinking water that applies to both community water systems and non-transient non-community water systems.

In some other countries, when developing national drinking water standards based on the guideline values, it is necessary to take account of a variety of geographical, socio-economic, dietary, and other conditions affecting potential exposure. These factors lead to national standards that differ appreciably from the guideline values. That is the case in countries such as India and Bangladesh, where the permissible limit of arsenic in absence of an alternative source of water is 0.05 mg/L.

=== Challenges to implementation ===
Arsenic removal technologies are traditional treatment processes that have been tailored to improve the removal of arsenic from drinking water. Although some of the removal processes, such as precipitative processes, adsorption processes, ion exchange processes, and separation (membrane) processes, may be technically feasible, their cost may be prohibitive.

For underdeveloped countries, the challenge is finding the means to fund such technologies. The Environmental Protection Agency, for example, has estimated the total national annualized cost of treatment, monitoring, reporting, record keeping, and administration to enforce the MCL rule to be approximately $181 million. Most of the cost is due to the installation and operation of the treatment technologies needed to reduce arsenic in public water systems.

== Pregnancy ==
Arsenic exposure through groundwater is highly concerning throughout the perinatal period. Pregnant women are a high-risk population because not only are they at risk for adverse outcomes, but in-utero exposure also poses health risks to the fetus.

There is a dose-dependent relationship between perinatal exposure to arsenic and infant mortality, meaning that infants born to people exposed to higher concentrations, or exposed for longer periods, have a higher mortality rate.

Studies have shown that ingesting arsenic through groundwater during pregnancy poses dangers to the pregnant woman, including, but not limited to, abdominal pain, vomiting, diarrhea, skin pigmentation changes, and cancer. Research has also demonstrated that arsenic exposure causes low birth weight, low birth size, infant mortality, and a variety of other outcomes in infants. Some of these effects, like lower birth rate and size, may be due to the effects of arsenic on weight gain during pregnancy.

== See also ==
- 2007 Peruvian meteorite event – a meteorite impact believed to have caused arsenic poisoning
- Arsenic contamination of groundwater
- Mary Ann Cotton – serial arsenic poisoner
- Felicia Dorothea Kate Dover – arsenic poisoner
- James Marsh (chemist) – invented the Marsh test for detecting arsenic
- Toroku arsenic disease
- 1858 Bradford sweets poisoning - accidental arsenic poisoning caused mass death, leading to increased regulation
- Croydon Poisonings - unsolved murder case of three arsenic poisonings
- The Pardoner's Tale – Chaucerian tale featuring murder with ratsbane
- Madame Bovary – fictional suicide by arsenic
- Lady Macbeth of the Mtsensk District (novella) – fictional murder by arsenical rat poison
