= Piratininga crater =

- Location within Brazil
- Location: Paraná Basin, São Paulo, Brazil; 22°28′12″S 49°09′00″W

Impact crater structure
- Confidence: Probable (2017); Questionable (2019)
- Diameter: 12 km (7.5 mi)
- Depth: 130 m (430 ft)
- Age: ~117 Ma; Aptian
- Exposed: Yes
- Drilled: No

Piratininga crater is a 12 kilometres (7.5 mi) diameter circular feature in the Paraná Basin of São Paulo State in Brazil. It is a possible impact crater, but further investigation is needed to obtain more information on the structure. The Russian Academy of Sciences listed the structure as a probable impact crater in 2017, but as questionable in 2019.

== Description ==
The Piratininga crater is located in São Paulo State, Brazil. The structure was identified in the 1970s. The crater is heavily eroded and has a 130 metres (430 ft) topographic difference between the centre and rim of the crater. The structure is analysed with aeromagnetic and seismic surveys. The identified structures are not conclusive for an impact crater and more research is needed. Normal faults have been registered in the east of the structure with smaller faults located in the west. The age has been estimated at Cretaceous, and possibly the Aptian, around 117 Ma.

== See also ==
- List of possible impact structures on Earth
- List of impact craters in South America
- Cerro do Jarau crater
- Santa Marta crater
