= Vichada =

Vichada may refer to:

- Department of Vichada, a subdivision of Colombia
- Vichada River, a river in eastern Colombia
- Vichada Structure, impact structure in Colombia
