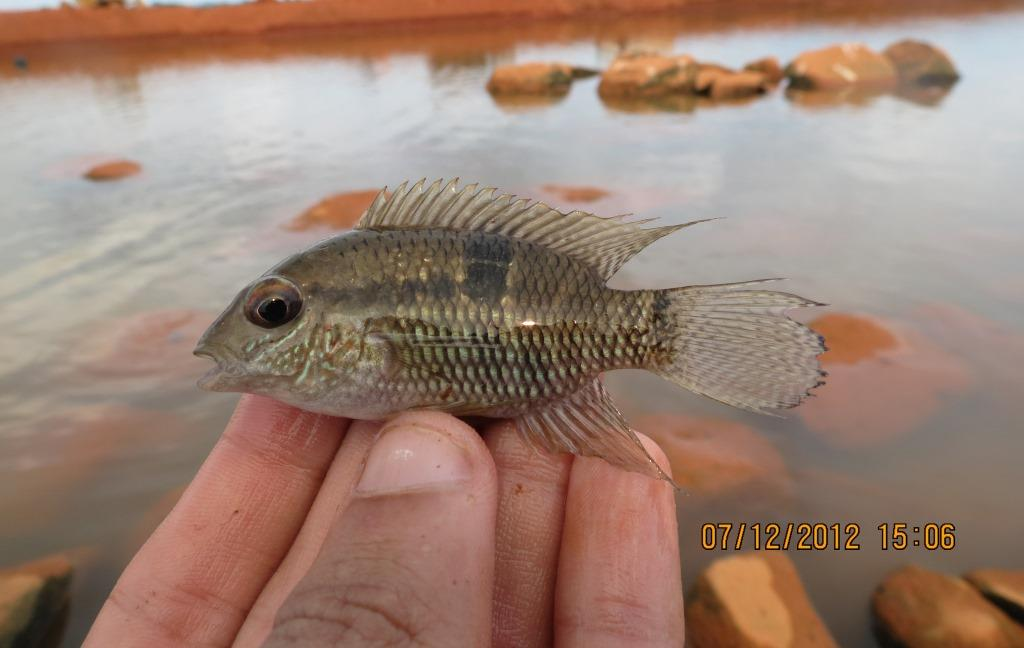

Scientific classification
- Kingdom: Animalia
- Phylum: Chordata
- Class: Actinopterygii
- Order: Cichliformes
- Family: Cichlidae
- Subfamily: Cichlinae
- Tribe: Cichlasomatini
- Genus: Aequidens
- Species: A. tetramerus

Binomial name
- Aequidens tetramerus (Heckel, 1840)

Synonyms
- Acara tetramerus Heckel, 1840; Chromys uniocellata Castelnau, 1855; Aequidens stollei Miranda-Ribeiro, 1918; Acaronia trimaculata Allen, 1942

= Saddle cichlid =

Species of fish

The saddle cichlid (Aequidens tetramerus) is a species of cichlid from the tribe Cichlasomatini, part of the subfamily Cichlasomatinae from South America. It is the type species of the genus Aequidens. It is reasonably common in the aquarium trade.

== Description ==
The saddle cichlid shows significant variation in colour and thus variation is geographic. In the western parts of its range, in Ecuador and Peru they develop striking red or orange colouration on the lower jaw, the head and the forward portion of the belly while Brazilian specimens are more of an overall grey or blue or green colouration. The males grow larger than the females and they usually grow extensions to the dorsal, caudal and anal fins as they reach sexual maturity. In spawning condition the males are more brightly coloured than the females. The maximum recorded length of the saddle cichlid is 162 millimetres (6.4 in).

== Distribution ==
The saddle cichlid is the most widely distributed of the cichlids in the genus Aequidens it is found throughout the basin of the Amazon River in Peru, Colombia, Ecuador, Brazil and Bolivia. It also occurs in the Rio Tocantins and Rio Parnaiba, in French Guiana, Suriname, Guyana as well as in the Orinoco River basin in Venezuela and Colombia.

== Habitat and biology ==
The saddle cichlid is a habitat generalist which shows a preference for slow-moving or still water with complex substrates consisting of submerged tree roots, branches, leaf litter and other objects. During periods of high water this species moves into flooded forests and this results in its occurrence in flood plain lakes and oxbows. It is most commonly observed in the quieter tributaries instead of the main river channels and has also been recorded at localities with a dense growth of aquatic plants. The water in the rivers in which it occurs can vary from clear through to almost black, although clear water appears to be favoured.

They are omnivorous, especially in captivity, but wild fish have diet dominated by invertebrates, such as insects, and small fish, as well as some vegetable matter

It is a highly territorial species which lives in pairs. Around a thousand eggs are laid on a stone or piece of wood. The eggs are tended by both parents.

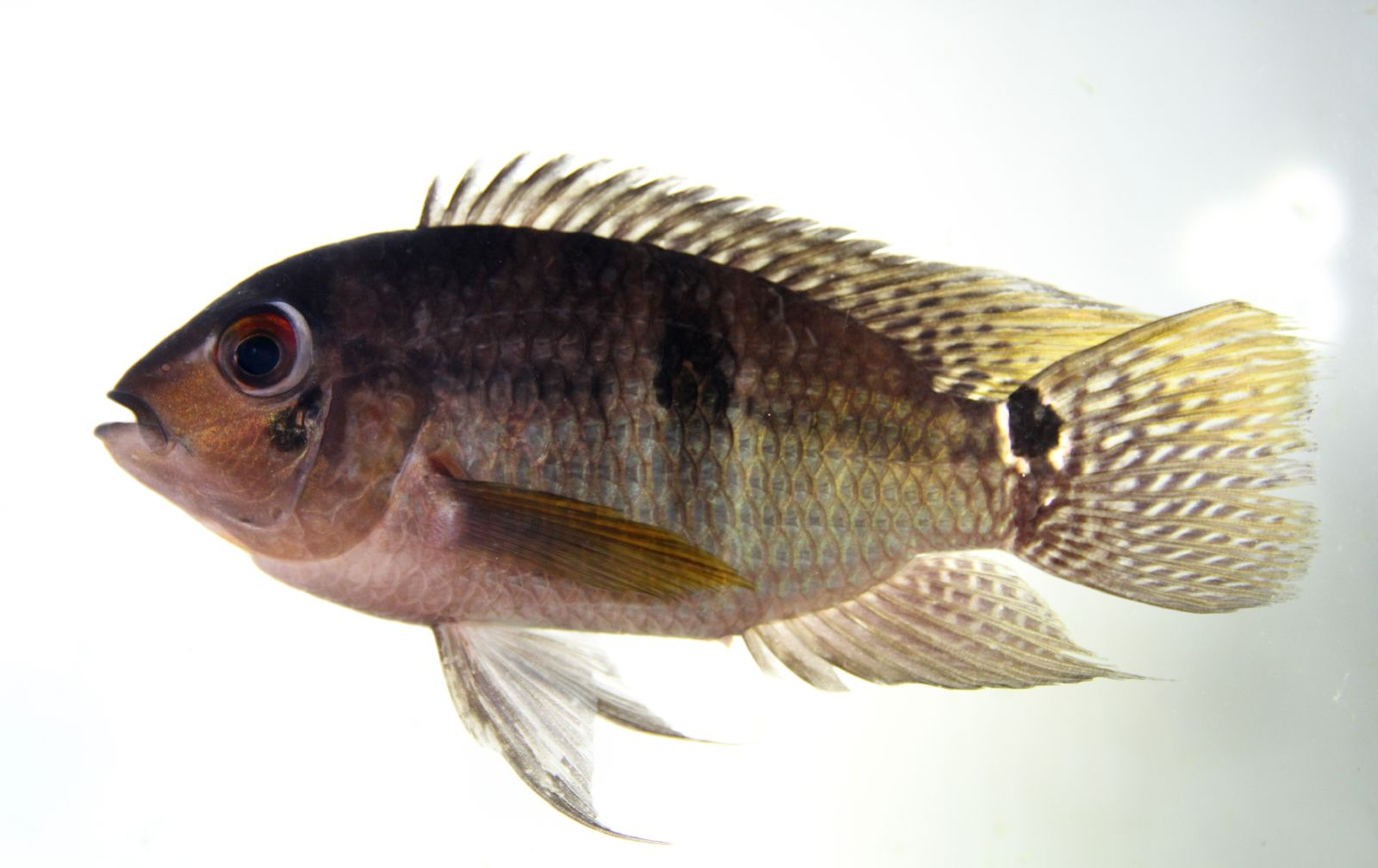

== Taxonomy ==
This species is the type species of the genus Aequidens but many authorities have hypothesised that as currently recognised this taxon is probably a group of related fish species instead of a single taxonand that some of the distinct populations may be described as distinct species once detailed analysis is performed. A. tetramerus and its closely related taxa have been found to be a sister taxa to the genus Cichlasoma and this has suggested that Aequidens is a nomen dubium due to paraphyly and that all but two species should be placed in the genus Cichlasome while two species should be placed in Krobia.

== Aquaria ==
The saddle cichlid is easy to obtain and relatively easy to keep and breed as an aquarium fish, although the males can be territorial and they may prey on smaller species kept in a community tank.
