= Serra da Cangalha =

Impact crater in Brazil

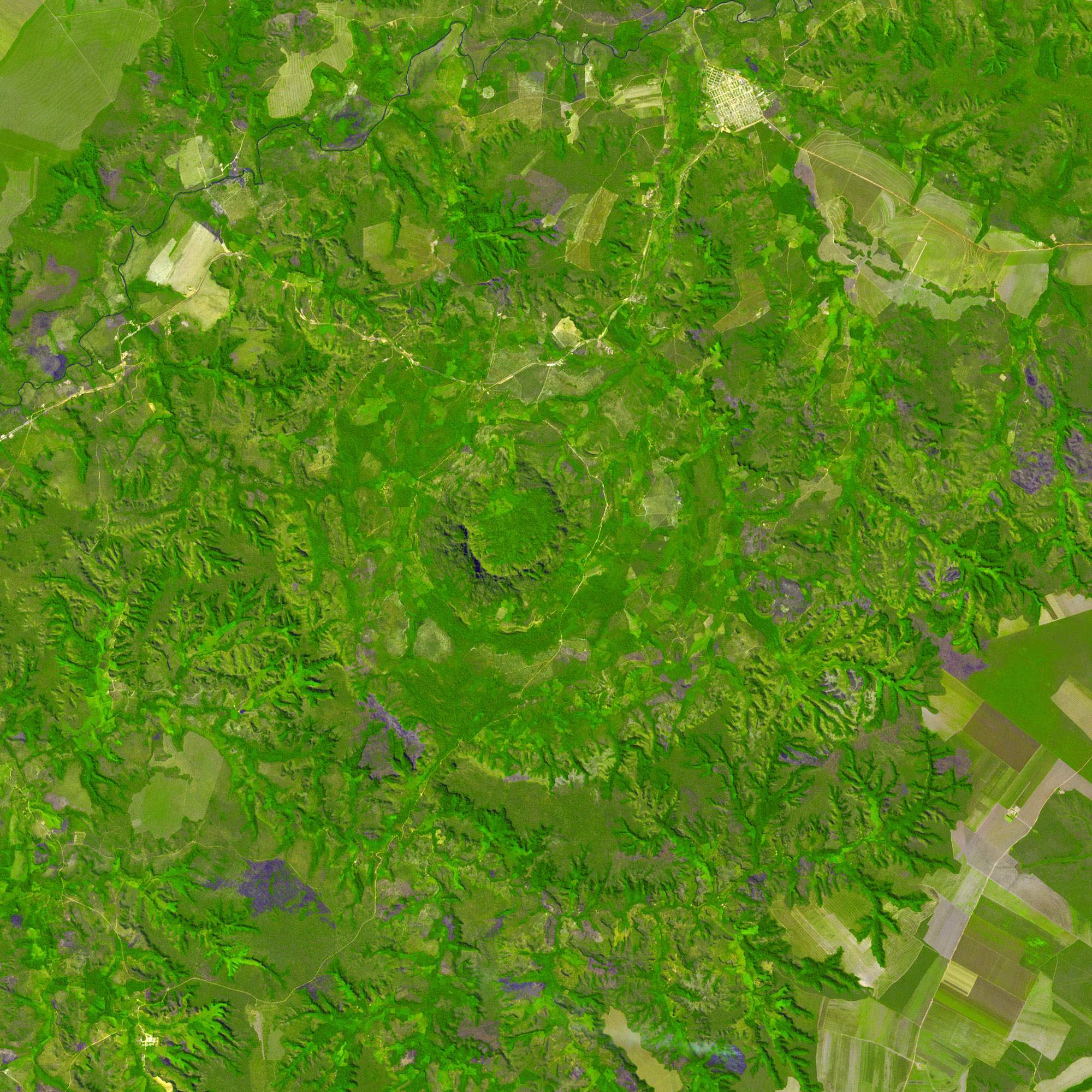

- Location within Brazil
- Location: Tocantins, Brazil; 8°5′S 46°52′W

Impact crater structure
- Confidence: Confirmed
- Diameter: c. 12.5 km
- Age: c. 220 million years
- Exposed: Yes
- Drilled: Yes

Serra da Cangalha is an impact crater in Tocantins, Brazil. The crater is between 12 and 13 kilometres (7.5 and 8.1 mi) in diameter, making it the second-largest known crater in Brazil. Its was formed around 220 million years ago, during the Triassic. The name means Pack-Saddle Mountains in Portuguese.

== Description ==
The outer perimeter is a circular inward scarp around 12.5 kilometres (7.8 mi) in diameter on the largely undisturbed Cretaceous and upper Silurian sediments of the Parnaíba basin, breached on the west, north, and south sides by drainage valleys. Within the perimeter there is a series of concentric circular valleys and a central basin, all at roughly the same elevation, separated by ring walls. Shuttle Radar Topography Mission imagery shows a faint ring about 11 kilometres (6.8 mi) in diameter, a second ring of gentle hills around 5.5 kilometres (3.4 mi) in diameter, and an inner ring of steeper hills, about 3 kilometres (1.9 mi) in diameter and up to 420 metres (1,380 ft) high, open to the northwest, surrounding a central basin about 2.2 kilometres (1.4 mi) in diameter.

The impact origin is attested by the presence of impact breccias, quartzite shatter cones, and shocked quartz. The meteorite is believed to have struck the surface at a low oblique angle, 25 to 30 degrees, on dry land. Radial faults are present inside the crater, and some extend up to 16 kilometers from the center. Disturbed and steeply inclined sediments from the Carboniferous and Devonian periods occur within the crater. Formations affected include Longá, Poti, Piauí and Pedra de Fogo formations of Devonian to Late Permian age.

A magnetic survey of the structure indicates that deformation within the crater extends to a depth of about 2 kilometres (1.2 mi).

== History and studies ==
The identification of the structure as an impact crater was first published in 1973 by Robert Dietz and B.M. French. Shatter cones were reported by Beatty in 1980. Impact breccias, impact melting, and shocked quartz were reported by McHone in his 1986 thesis. A magnetic survey of the structure was published by A.A. Adepelumi and others in 2005.

== See also ==
- Riachão Ring
- Santa Marta crater
