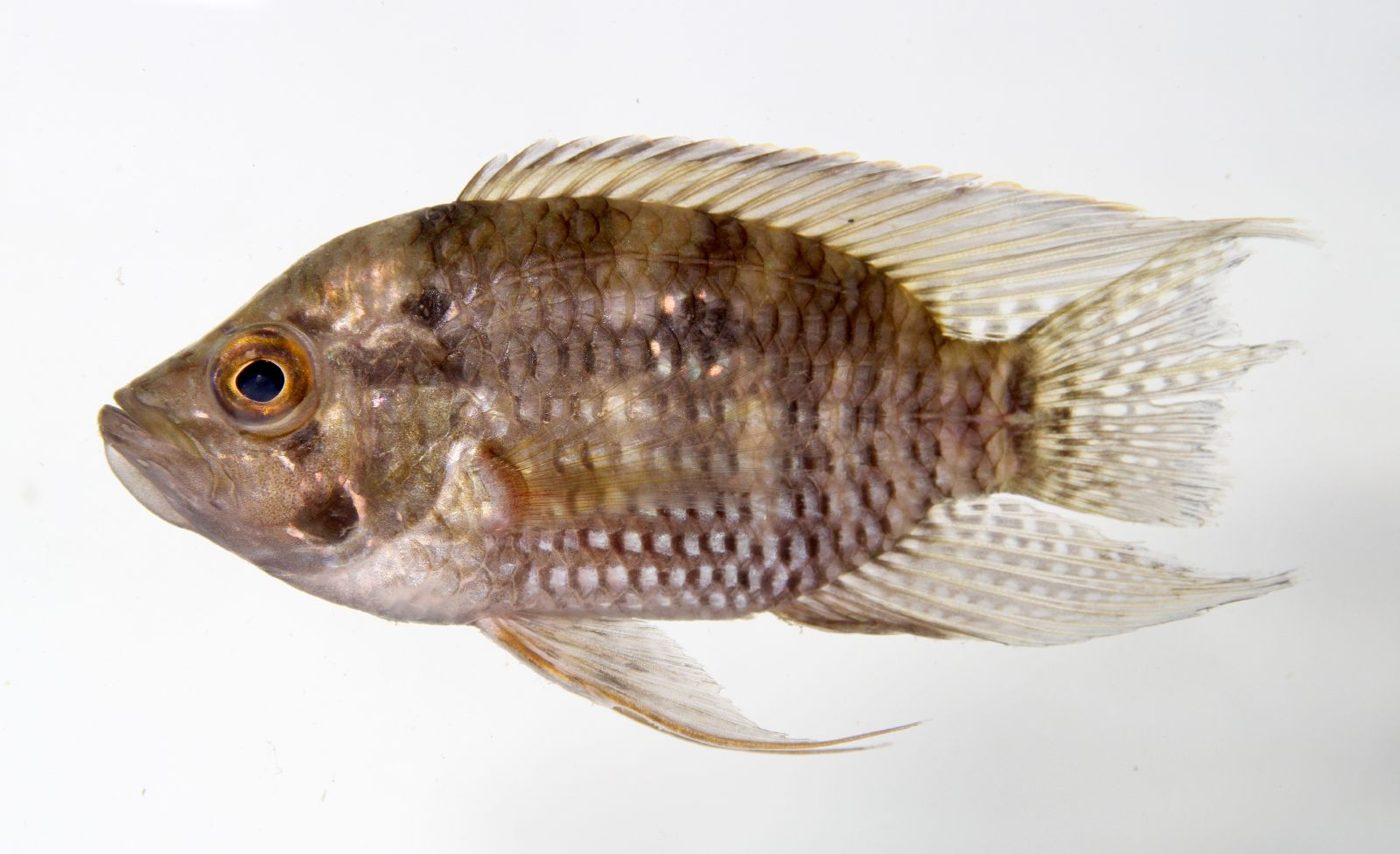

Scientific classification
- Kingdom: Animalia
- Phylum: Chordata
- Class: Actinopterygii
- Order: Cichliformes
- Family: Cichlidae
- Genus: Acaronia
- Species: A. vultuosa

Binomial name
- Acaronia vultuosa (Kullander, 2003)

= Acaronia vultuosa =

Species of fish

Acaronia vultuosa, the spangled cichlid, is a species of cichlid found throughout the Orinoco Basin, including the Casiquiare, Inírida River, and the Vichada River, as well as the Rio Negro. This species can reach a length of 12 centimetres (4.7 in) TL. It inhabits the waters close to the bank that are rich in vegetation, and preys on smaller fish.
