= Rondonacara hoehnei =

Scientific classification
- Kingdom: Animalia
- Phylum: Chordata
- Class: Actinopterygii
- Order: Cichliformes
- Family: Cichlidae
- Subfamily: Cichlinae
- Tribe: Cichlasomatini
- Genus: Rondonacara; Ottoni & Mattos, 2015
- Species: R. hoehnei

Binomial name
- Rondonacara hoehnei (A. Miranda-Ribeiro, 1918)

Synonyms
- Aequidens hoehnei (Miranda-Ribeiro, 1918); Nannacara hoehnei Miranda-Ribeiro, 1918

Species of fish

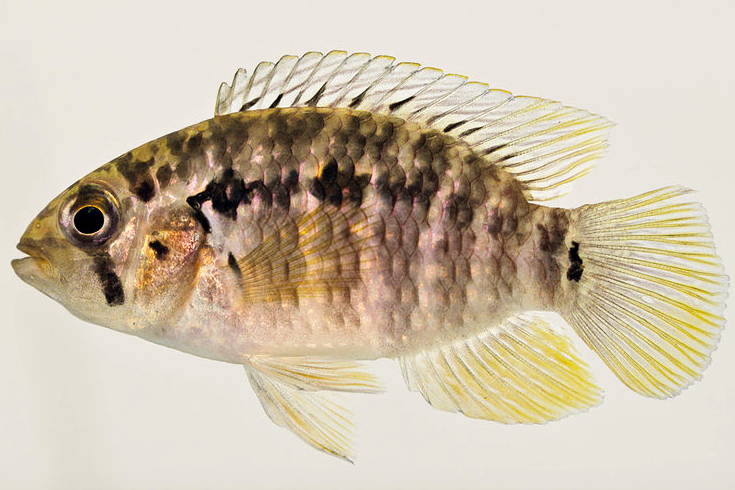

Rondonacara hoehnei is a species of cichlid fish of the subfamily Cichlinae. This species is endemic to the upper das Mortes River basin in the Araguaia drainage of central Brazil. This species is the only known member of its genus, but it was formerly included in Aequidens. Although not yet rated by the IUCN, it has been suggested that it is seriously threatened and should be considered critically endangered. The specific name honour the collector of the type specimen, the Brazilian botanist Frederico Carlos Hoehne (1882-1959).
