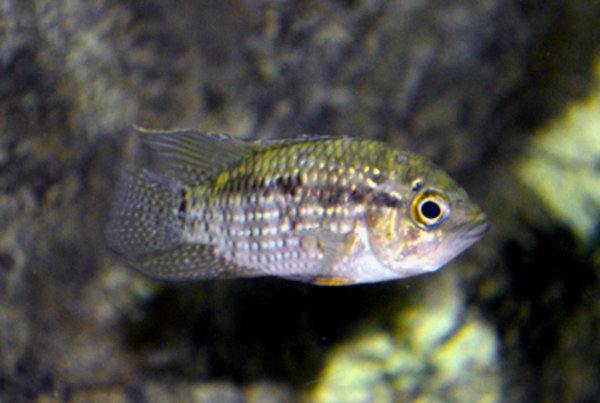

Conservation status
- Least Concern (IUCN 3.1)

Scientific classification
- Kingdom: Animalia
- Phylum: Chordata
- Class: Actinopterygii
- Order: Cichliformes
- Family: Cichlidae
- Genus: Acaronia
- Species: A. nassa

Binomial name
- Acaronia nassa (Heckel, 1840)

Synonyms
- Acara nassa Heckel, 1840; Acara cognatus Heckel, 1840; Acara unicolor Heckel, 1840; Centrarchus rostratus Jardine, 1843; Apistogramma ambloplitoides Fowler, 1940

= Acaronia nassa =

Species of fish

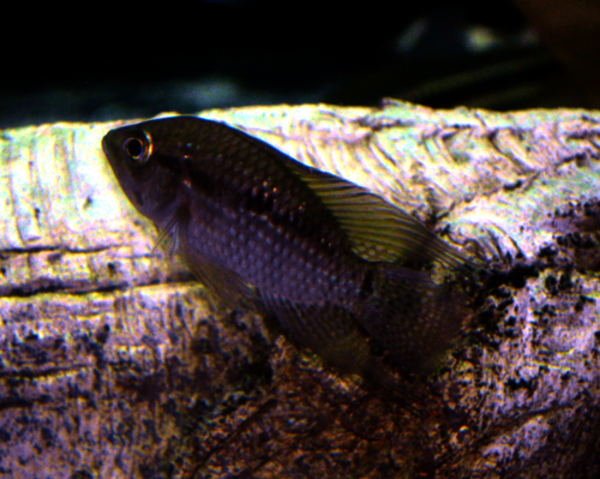
A bigeye cichlid swimming in a tank

Acaronia nassa is a species of cichlid native to the Amazon basin and the Oyapock and Essequibo drainages of South America. Growing up to 25 cm (9.8 in) total length, this species is utilised as a food source and for the aquarium trade. It is commonly known as the bigeye cichlid in English, acará boca de quguiá in Portuguese, and paya in French.
