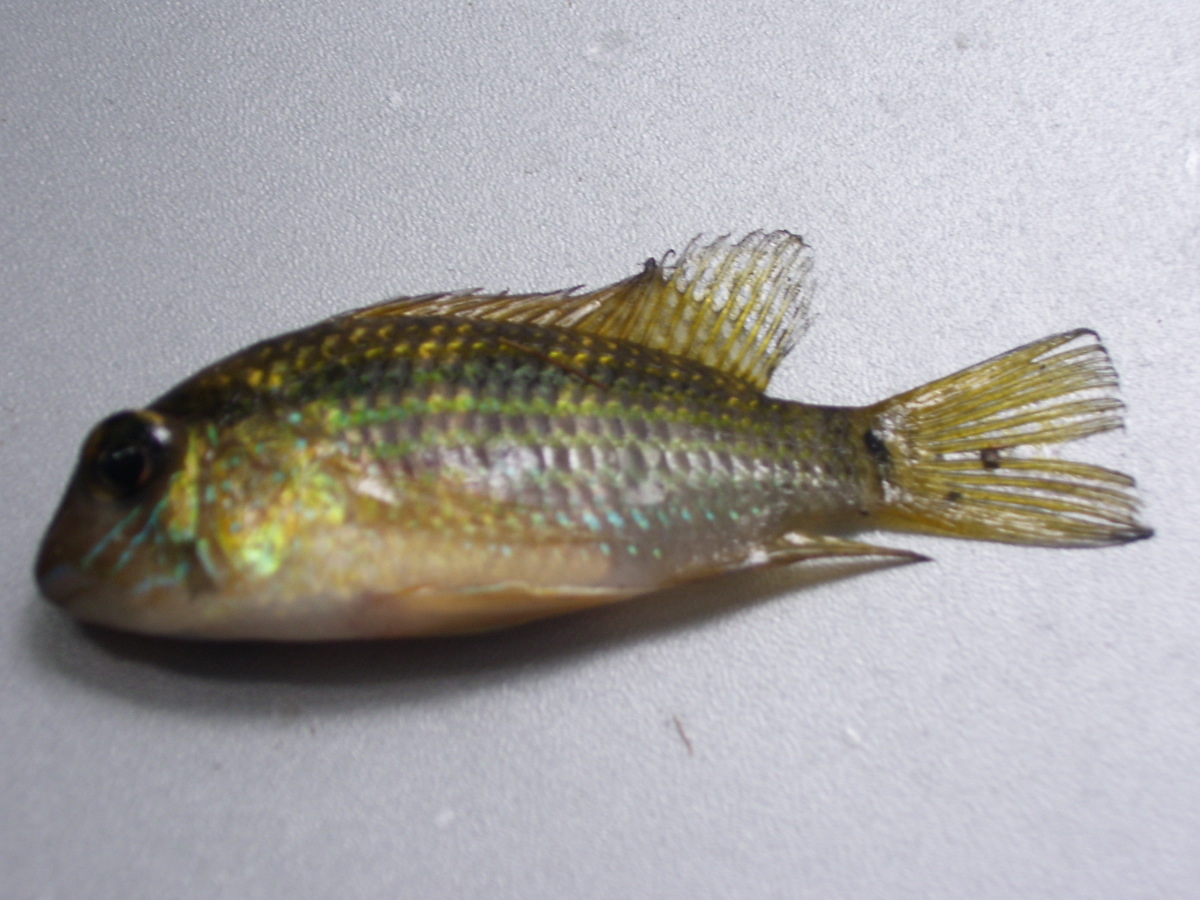
- Bujurquina syspilus

Scientific classification
- Domain: Eukaryota
- Kingdom: Animalia
- Phylum: Chordata
- Class: Actinopterygii
- Order: Cichliformes
- Family: Cichlidae
- Genus: Bujurquina
- Species: B. syspilus

Binomial name
- Bujurquina syspilus (Cope, 1872)

Synonyms
- Acara syspilus Cope, 1872 Aequidens syspilus (Cope, 1872)

= Bujurquina syspilus =

Species of fish

Bujurquina syspilus is a species of fish from the genus Bujurquina.
