= Cerro do Jarau crater =

Possible impact crater in Rio Grande do Sul, Brazil

- Location within Brazil
- Location: Paraná Basin, Quaraí, Campanha Ocidental, Sudoeste, Rio Grande do Sul, Brazil; 30°11′53.3″S 56°32′40.8″W

Impact crater structure
- Confidence: Probable
- Diameter: ~13.5 km (8.4 mi)
- Rise: >200 m (660 ft)
- Age: 105 to 128.7 Ma; Early Cretaceous
- Exposed: Yes
- Drilled: No

Cerro do Jarau crater is a 13.5 kilometres (8.4 mi) diameter circular feature in the Paraná Basin, Rio Grande do Sul in southern Brazil, close to the border with Uruguay. The Russian Academy of Sciences lists the structure as a probable impact crater.

== Description ==
Cerro do Jarau is a prominent, approximately 13.5 kilometres (8.4 mi) wide, circular landform rising more than 200 metres (660 ft) above the plains of the pampas in southern Brazil. The name (meaning Jarau hills) comes from the prominent crests of silicified sandstones, which form a semiring of elevated hills in the northern part of the structure. The origin of this structure has been debated for decades, and varied suggestions of its formation include either endogenous tectonic processes or large meteorite impact. However, no conclusive evidence to support either hypothesis has been presented to date.

This structure was formed in Mesozoic volcano-sedimentary rocks of the Paraná Basin and consists of the Jurassic to Cretaceous Guará (sandstones), Botucatu (sandstones), and Serra Geral (basalts) formations. The Botucatu Formation sandstones are intensely silicified and deformed, and were subject to radial and annular faulting. Investigations at Cerro do Jarau identified the occurrence of parautochthonous monomict lithic breccia and polymict breccias resembling suevite and striated joint surfaces resembling crude shatter cones in sandstones and basalts. In addition, the first mineral deformation studies show the presence of rare planar features in quartz clasts in polymict breccias. The identification of these features at Cerro do Jarau is suggestive of an impact origin for the structure.

If confirmed by further investigation of possible shock features, Cerro do Jarau would become the sixth known impact structure in Brazil, as well as the fifth basalt-hosted impact structure on Earth. The crater formed in the same basaltic unit as the nearby Vista Alegre crater and the Vargeão Dome. The age of impact has been given at 117 Ma (Aptian), or a broader range from 128.7 to 105 Ma.

== See also ==
- List of possible impact structures on Earth
- List of impact craters in South America
- Praia Grande crater
