= Croydon poisonings =

1928–29 series of unsolved murders in England

Coordinates: 51°21′43″N 0°5′22″W

The Croydon poisonings were a series of unsolved murders by arsenic poisoning that took place in Croydon, Surrey, in 1928–1929. Three relatives all consumed lethal amounts of arsenic, but despite investigation and potential suspects, no specific evidence was found and the crime has never been solved.

== Murders ==
On 27 April 1928, an upper middle class retired colonial civil servant Edmund Creighton Duff returned from a fishing trip in Hampshire to his home, 29 Birdhurst Rise in Croydon. He began to feel unwell and was examined by a doctor, who found no serious concerns. Some hours later, he began vomiting and having painful cramps, and died. The local physician believed he had suffered sudden heart failure.

On 14 February 1929, his sister in law, Vera Sidney (or Sydney) suddenly became ill, after eating soup that lunchtime, which she complained tasted "gritty". Though other members of the household, including the cook and a cat all felt unwell, Vera's condition deteriorated quickly and she died two days later.

At the time, foul play was not suspected. Vera's mother, Violet Sidney, was devastated at the loss of her daughter. She had been prescribed a tonic by a doctor. On 5 March 1929, she took the tonic and complained of a "gritty" taste. She told the doctor, "the liquid burned my throat", then lost consciousness and died a few hours later.

== Aftermath ==
Following Violet's death, surviving family members asked for an inquest. After exhuming on 22 March 1929, both Violet and Vera were found to have traces of arsenic in their bodies. Edmund Duff was also exhumed on 15 May 1929, when arsenic was also found. A tin of weedkiller was discovered in the garden shed, and it was believed to have been added to Edmund's beer, Vera's soup and Violet's tonic, killing all three of them.

Despite these deaths, the killer was never discovered. Public opinion suspected Grace Duff (Edmund Duff's wife, Violet Sidney's daughter and Vera Sidney's sister) was the likely culprit, but this was not backed up with any evidence. While Grace Duff and her brother Thomas Sidney financially benefitted from their mother's death, nobody is known to have gained financially from the death of Edmund Duff.

Thomas Sidney moved to the US, while Grace Duff settled on the English South Coast. They lost contact around 1940 and never spoke to each other again.

In 1975, Richard Whittington-Egan published The Riddle of Birdhurst Rise, in which he directly accused Grace of murdering Edmund because she hated him, and her mother and sister for the money. Because this was considered libelous, it was not published until after Grace's death on 24 June 1973, aged 86.

29 Birdhurst Rise was demolished, and is now a block of flats.

== Bibliography ==
- Berry-Dee, Christopher (2026). Inside the Darkest Minds – How Killers are Caught and the Secrets of Those who Got Away. Orion. ISBN 978-1-399-63601-8.
- Hargreaves, Tony (2020). Poisons and Poisonings : Death by Stealth. Royal Society of Chemistry. ISBN 978-1-839-16298-5.
- Newton, Michael (2009). The Encyclopedia of Unsolved Crimes. Facts On File. ISBN 978-1-438-11914-4.
- Odell, Robin; Gaute, JHH (1991). The New Murderers' Who's who. Dorset Press. ISBN 978-0-880-29582-6.
