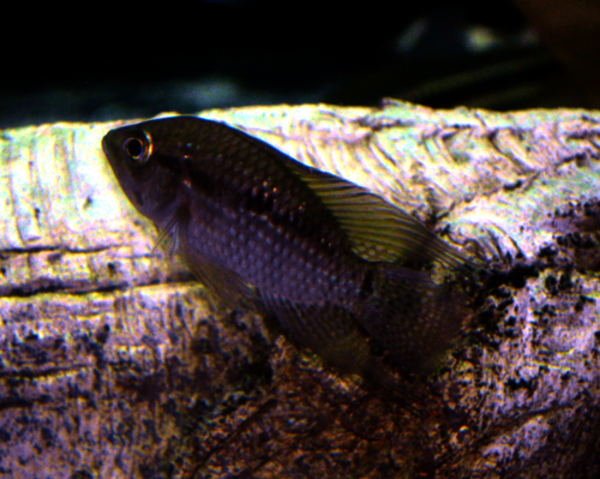
- Acaronia nassa

Scientific classification
- Kingdom: Animalia
- Phylum: Chordata
- Class: Actinopterygii
- Division: Teleostei
- Order: Cichliformes
- Family: Cichlidae
- Subfamily: Cichlinae
- Tribe: Cichlasomatini
- Genus: Acaronia; G. S. Myers, 1940

Type species
- Acara nassa Heckel, 1840

= Acaronia =

Genus of fishes

Acaronia is a small genus of cichlids found in the Amazon, Orinoco and other basins in northern South America.

== Species ==
There are currently two recognized species in this genus:

- Acaronia nassa (Heckel, 1840) (bigeye cichlid)
- Acaronia vultuosa S. O. Kullander, 1989 (spangled cichlid)
