= Toroku arsenic disease =

Disease caused by pollution in Japan

Toroku arsenic disease (土呂久砒素公害, Toroku hiso kōgai) was a disease resulting from air and water pollution from a refinery at a mine at Toroku, located in Takachiho, Nishiusuki District, Miyazaki, Japan.

It emitted arsenic-containing air, resulting in patients with chronic arsenic poisoning producing skin changes, skin cancers and sometimes lung cancer. The Sumitomo Metal Mining Co., Ltd., which bought the right of mining, was sued by the patients for health damage, but 15 years later, the lawsuit ended with a compromise.

== History ==
The pollution at Toroku dates back to 1690 according to A Table of Public Hazards of Japan

- Between 1920 and 1941, and between 1955 and 1962, arsenic production was conducted at a refinery which produced smoke, which stayed deep in V-shaped valleys. Workers and inhabitants developed chronic arsenic poisoning, and five died in a family of seven in succession.
- In 1925, horses and cows died possibly due to pollution, recorded a veterinarian.
- In 1967, the mining rights went from a small factory to Sumitomo Metal Mining Company.
- On December 8, 1970, Tsurue Sato sought advice at a branch of the Legal Affairs Bureau.
- On November 13, 1971, elementary school teacher Masa Saito published the presence of health damage by the refinery after meeting Tsurue Sato.
- The response of Miyazaki Prefecture was quick; however, the response at first tried to underestimate the damage.
- This case was brought to court against the Sumitomo Mining Company and the trial started in 1975.

== Medical examinations ==
Seven patients were examined extensively at Kumamoto University, and they were diagnosed as having chronic arsenic poisoning due to pollution, in a report published in 1973. The same team increased the number of patients to 48 in 1976, while Hotta and his co-workers made extensive studies of the pollution.

== Symptoms of patients in Toroku pollution ==
=== Skin and otorhinolaryngological symptoms ===
Nakamura et al. characterized the condition by pigmentation which is either macular or diffuse, appearing both in covered and exposed areas. Punctate depigmentation appears in raindrop shapes, and hard keratoses are either localized or diffuse. Malignant changes may occur. They pointed out nasal septum defects. The environmental agency first indicated the skin and ENT findings of nasal scar or septum defect as necessary symptoms for the Toroku Pollution.

=== Other symptoms ===
In addition to the skin and ENT findings, neuritis was added as a criterion of chronic arsenic poisoning. Bowen's disease, Lung cancer, and cancer of the urinary organ were added as appearing following chronic arsenic poisoning.

== Arsenic pollution in other areas of Japan ==
- Namikata, Ehime, discovered in 1933, called the black baby incident. The cause remains unknown.
- Nishikawa, Niigata, discovered in 1955, Pollution due to disposal of agricultural drugs
- Nakajo, Niigata, discovered in 1959, Caused by 75 year pollution of waste of a factory, Resulting in lung cancers
