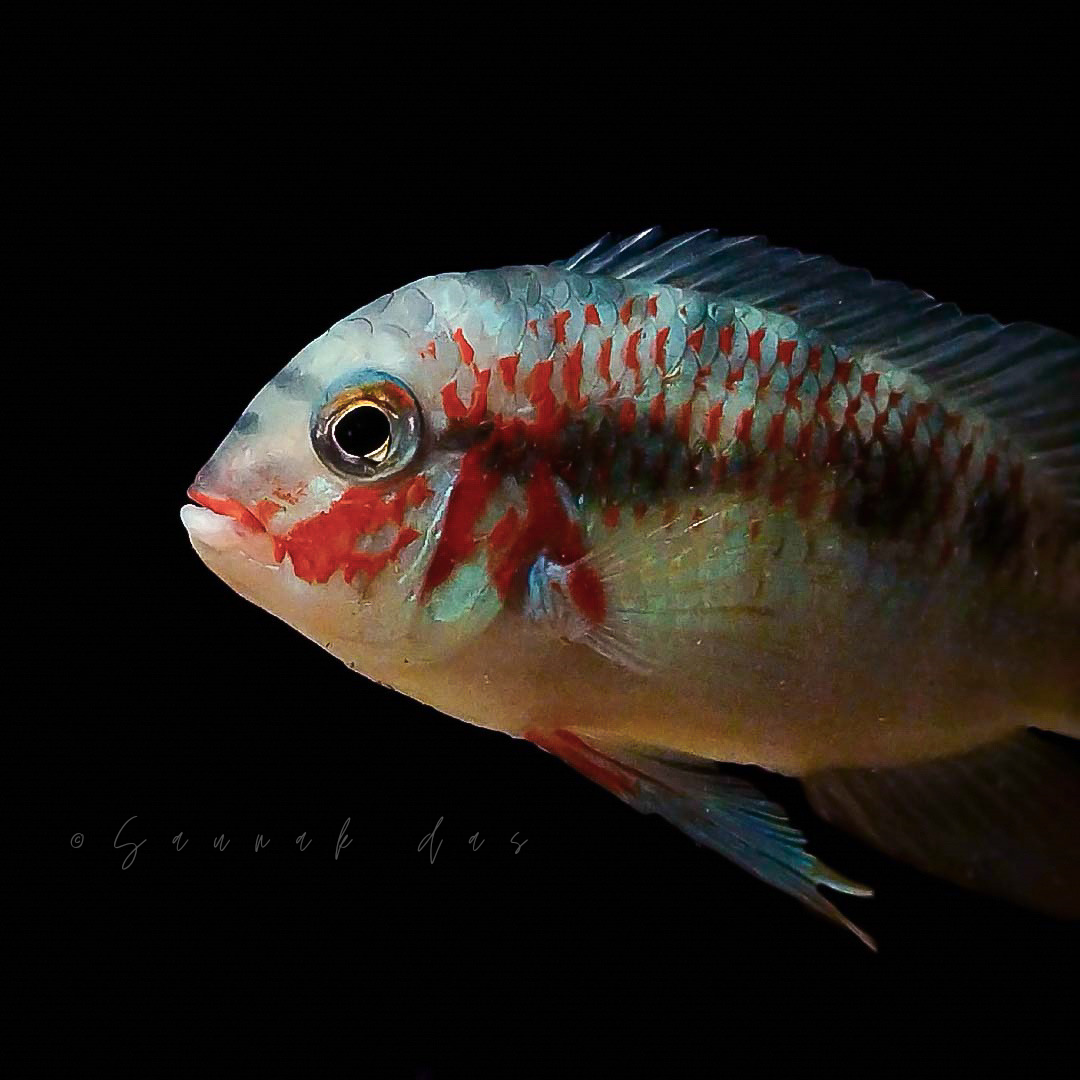
- Krobia xinguensis

Scientific classification
- Kingdom: Animalia
- Phylum: Chordata
- Class: Actinopterygii
- Order: Cichliformes
- Family: Cichlidae
- Tribe: Cichlasomatini
- Genus: Krobia; S. O. Kullander & Nijssen, 1989

Type species
- Acara guianensis Regan, 1905

= Krobia (fish) =

Genus of fishes

Krobia is a genus of cichlid fish native to freshwater habitats in South America, with three species found in the Guianas and a single in the Xingu River basin. They are typically found in small streams or creeks with little current and they feed on small invertebrates. They reach up to 12.8 cm (5.0 in) in standard length. They were formerly included in Aequidens.

== Species ==
There are currently four recognized species in this genus:

- Krobia guianensis (Regan, 1905) (Krobia)
- Krobia itanyi (Puyo, 1943) (Dolphin cichlid)
- Krobia petitella Steele, Liverpool & López-Fernández, 2013
- Krobia xinguensis S. O. Kullander, 2012
