= 2007 Carancas impact event =

2007 meteorite strike in Peru

Carancas crater
- Location within Peru
- Location: Altiplano Basin, Carancas, Puno, Peru; 16°39′51.98″S 69°02′38.99″W

Impact crater structure
- Confidence: Confirmed
- Diameter: 13.5 m (44 ft)
- Depth: 4.5 metres (15 ft)
- Age: September 15, 2007
- Exposed: Yes
- Drilled: No
- Bolide type: Chondrite

The Carancas impact event refers to the fall of the Carancas chondritic meteorite on September 15, 2007, near the village of Carancas in Peru, close to the Bolivian border and Lake Titicaca. The impact created a small crater in the clay soil and scorched earth around its location. A local official, Marco Limache, said that "boiling water started coming out of the crater, and particles of rock and cinders were found nearby", as "fetid, noxious" gases spewed from the crater. Surface impact occurred above 3,800 metres (12,500 ft).

After the impact, villagers who had approached the impact site grew sick from a then-unexplained illness, with a wide array of symptoms. Two days later, Peruvian scientists confirmed that there had indeed been a meteorite strike, quieting widespread speculation that it might have been a geophysical rather than a celestial event. At that point, no further information on the cause of the mystery illness was known. The ground water in the local area is known to contain arsenic compounds, and the illness is now believed to have been caused by arsenic poisoning incurred when residents of the area inhaled the vapor of the boiling arsenic-contaminated water.

== Impact event ==
At 11:40:14 local time (16:40:14 GMT) on September 15, 2007, a chondritic meteorite crashed near the village of Carancas in the Puno Region, Peru, near the Bolivian border and Lake Titicaca (see map box on right). The impact created a crater larger than 4.5 m (15 ft) deep, 13 m (43 ft) wide, with visibly scorched earth around the impact site. A local official, Marco Limache, said that "boiling water started coming out of the crater, and particles of rock and cinders were found nearby", as "fetid, noxious" gases spewed from the crater. The crater size was given as 13.80 by 13.30 metres (45.3 by 43.6 ft), with its greatest dimensions in an east–west direction. The fireball had been observed by the locals as strongly luminous with a smoky tail, and seen from just 1,000 metres (3,300 ft) above the ground. The object moved in a direction toward N030E. The small seismic shock of the impact shattered the windows of the local health center 1-kilometer (0.62 mi) away. A smoke column was formed at the site that lasted several minutes, and gas was seen bubbling up in the water in the crater.

One villager was as close as 100 metres (330 ft) from the impact site. He fell from his bicycle but was not injured. A small building 120 metres (390 ft) from the impact site only sustained roof damage from flying debris. The loud noise and explosive impact originally led Peruvians to think that Chile had launched a rocket attack.

Soon after the impact, more than 600 villagers visited the site and some began to fall ill from unexplained causes, including symptoms of dermal injuries, nausea, headaches, diarrhea and vomiting. On September 20, Peruvian scientists confirmed that there had been a meteorite strike, but no further information on the cause of the illnesses was known. Impact crater specialists have called the impact unusual, and have stated that the meteorite was at least 3 m (10 ft) in diameter before disintegrating. The ground water in the area was known to contain arsenic compounds, and the illness was believed to have been caused by arsenic poisoning incurred when residents of the area inhaled the vapor of the boiling arsenic-contaminated water.

According to cosmochemist Larry Grossman of the University of Chicago, the aerial lights and explosions reported were consistent with extraterrestrial material. Astrophysicist Jose Ishitsuka of the Geophysical Institute of Peru confirmed that there had been a meteorite strike, and remains of the impactor were found at the crater site.

== Impactor ==
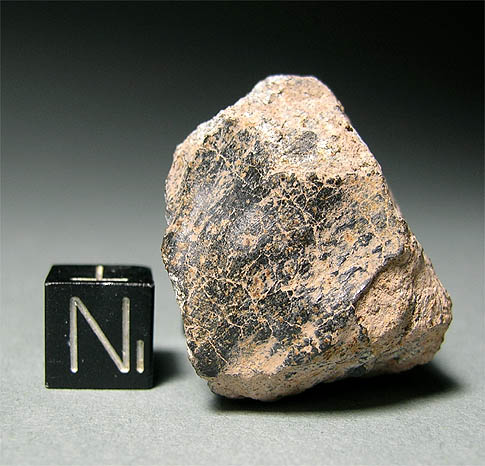
27.70 g (0.977 oz) fragment of the Carancas meteorite fall recovered several days after the fall. The scale cube is 1 cm^{3} (0.061 cu in).

On September 20, the X-Ray Laboratory at the Faculty of Geological Sciences, Mayor de San Andres University, La Paz, Bolivia, published a report of their analysis of a small sample of material recovered from the impact site. They detected iron, nickel, cobalt, and traces of iridium — elements characteristic of the elemental composition of meteorites. The quantitative proportions of silicon, aluminium, potassium, calcium, magnesium and phosphorus are incompatible with rocks that are normally found at the surface of the Earth.

INGEMMET (Instituto Geológico Minero y Metalúrgico) of Peru released internally a report on the Carancas meteorite fall on September 21. The release of the document to the public was delayed for one week. The researchers found that the fragments from the crater zone had a chondritic texture and the following mineral composition: pyroxene (1) 40%, olivine 20%, feldspar 10%, pyroxene (2) 10%; kamacite 15%, troilite 5%, and traces of chromite and native copper. Kamacite occurs naturally only in meteorites.

The official classification of the Carancas meteorite, accepted by the Meteoritical Society, was done by a team of scientists working at the University of Arizona. The meteorite is an ordinary chondrite, an H chondrite breccia, containing clasts of petrologic types 4 to 5. The formal classification is H4-5.

Further data were expected from NASA, along with British and Japanese researchers, who intended on looking into the matter.

== Illness complaints ==
Afterwards, local townspeople went to see what happened, and 100 to 200 people who got near to the meteorite crater soon reported feeling sick. First responding police officers arriving to investigate the scene also fell ill. After the initial event of September 15, the number of people falling ill increased, requiring physicians to establish auxiliary medical tents for the Carancas health center. Patients were treated for dermal injuries, nausea, headaches, diarrhea and vomiting. The death of nearby livestock was also reported. Locals made the decision to stop drinking from nearby water sources for fear of contamination and authorities considered declaring a state of emergency. Four days after the meteorite impact and the unexplained illness, most villagers reported having recovered.

Reported details about the event, such as water boiling in the muddy crater for ten minutes from the heat of the impact, presented a problem for experts. Because the impact site is at a high altitude of more than 3,800 m (12,467 ft), the meteoroid may not have been slowed down as much as it ordinarily would have been by passage through the Earth's denser lower atmosphere, and kinetic energy at impact may have been unusually high for a terrestrial impact of an object of this size and mass. Most larger meteorites are cold in their bulk mass when they land on Earth, since their heated outer layers ablate from the objects before impacting. It was later confirmed that the meteorite contained a large amount of iron and possessed magnetic properties common to similar metallic objects, which contributed to its capacity to retain heat during atmospheric entry.

=== Government response ===
In contrast with other international media reports, Peruvian health officials downplayed the incident. Jorge López Tejada, the Regional Health Director for Puno, Peru, denied any serious medical situation existed. However, a health brigade arrived with personnel and medication to the site on September 18, reporting that the odors rising from the crater were causing medical issues. Earlier, Tejada had stated that the officers were dizzy, nauseous and some were vomiting.

On September 19, Andina, Peru's official government news agency, reported that the sick villagers appeared to be recovering. "They are recovering, there aren't any critical cases. A total of 200 people with different symptoms have been seen," stated López Tejada. Government officials also specifically asked people to avoid the "glowing object that fell from the sky."

The mayor, Maximiliano Trujillo, assumed a psychosomatic reason behind the reports but decided to ask a local shaman to prepare a cleaning ritual in order to calm the population.

=== Suspected cause ===
Scientists initially ruled out radiation as the cause of the illness. Renan Ramirez of the Peruvian Institute of Nuclear Energy stated that the medical conditions could have been caused by sulfur, arsenic or other toxins that may have melted in the extreme heat produced by the meteorite strike. Some unnamed Peruvian sources stated soon after the event occurred that it was indeed a meteorite. Later on September 18, a Peruvian vulcanologist stated that the impact was caused by a chondrite meteorite arrival.

The illness may have been attributed to possible arsenic poisoning. Luisa Macedo of Peru's Mining, Metallurgy, and Geology Institute said gases were created when the meteorite's hot surface reacted with an underground water supply tainted with arsenic. Natural arsenic deposits in ground water are not uncommon in southern Peru. José Ishitsuka of the Peruvian Geophysics Institute said, "If the meteorite arrives incandescent and at a high temperature because of friction in the atmosphere, hitting water can create a column of steam." A doctor from a medical team found no evidence of radiation effects and that the illnesses may have been psychosomatic.

== See also ==
- List of impact craters in South America
- Culture of Peru
- Impact depth
- Impact event
- Meteoroid
- Campo del Cielo
