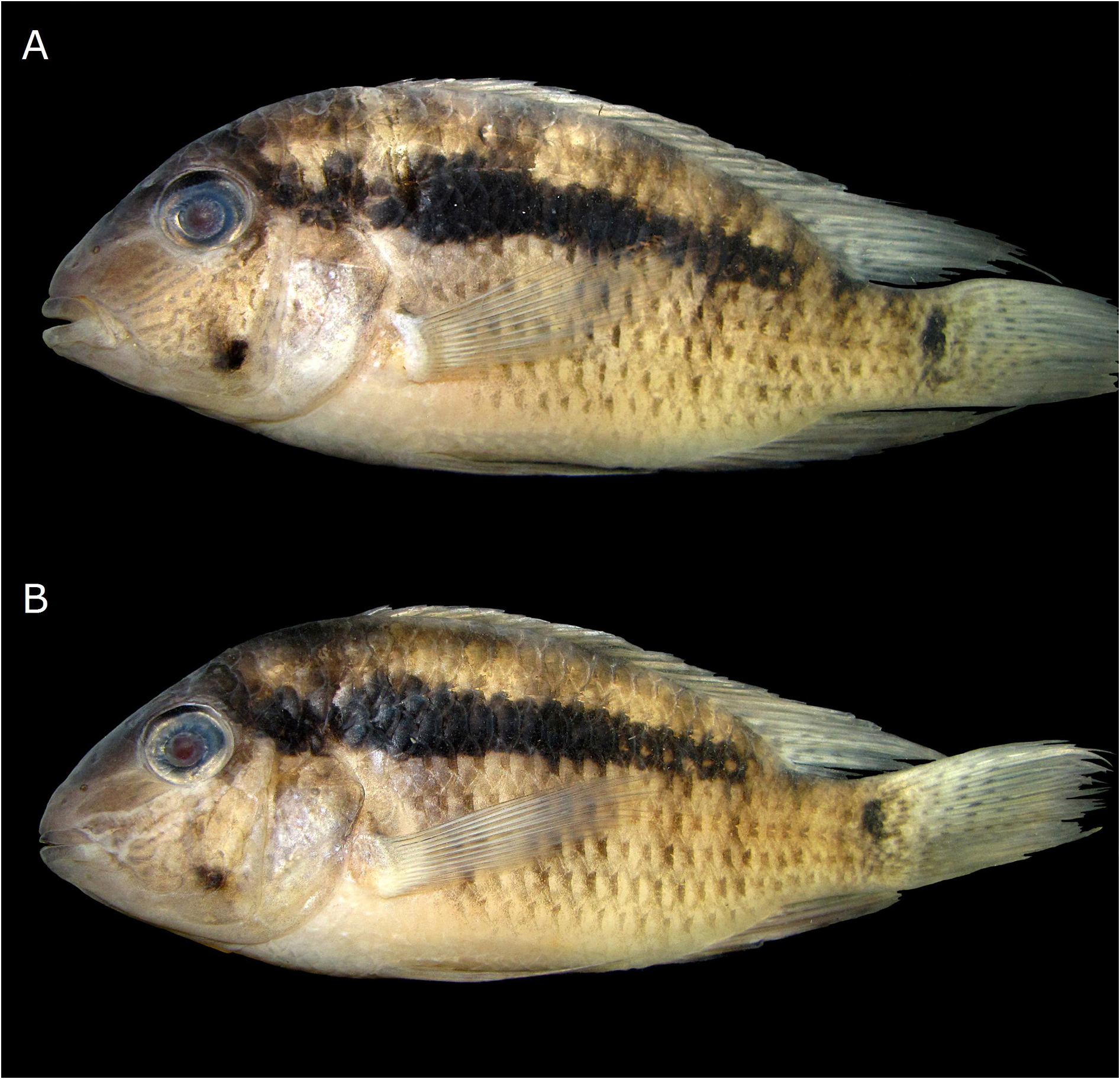

Scientific classification
- Kingdom: Animalia
- Phylum: Chordata
- Class: Actinopterygii
- Order: Cichliformes
- Family: Cichlidae
- Genus: Bujurquina
- Species: B. omagua

Binomial name
- Bujurquina omagua Říčan & Říčanová, 2023
- Distribution Native range

= Bujurquina omagua =

Species of fish

Bujurquina omagua is a species of fish from the genus Bujurquina. The species was described initially by Říčan, Oldřich & Říčanová, Štěpánka in 2023.
