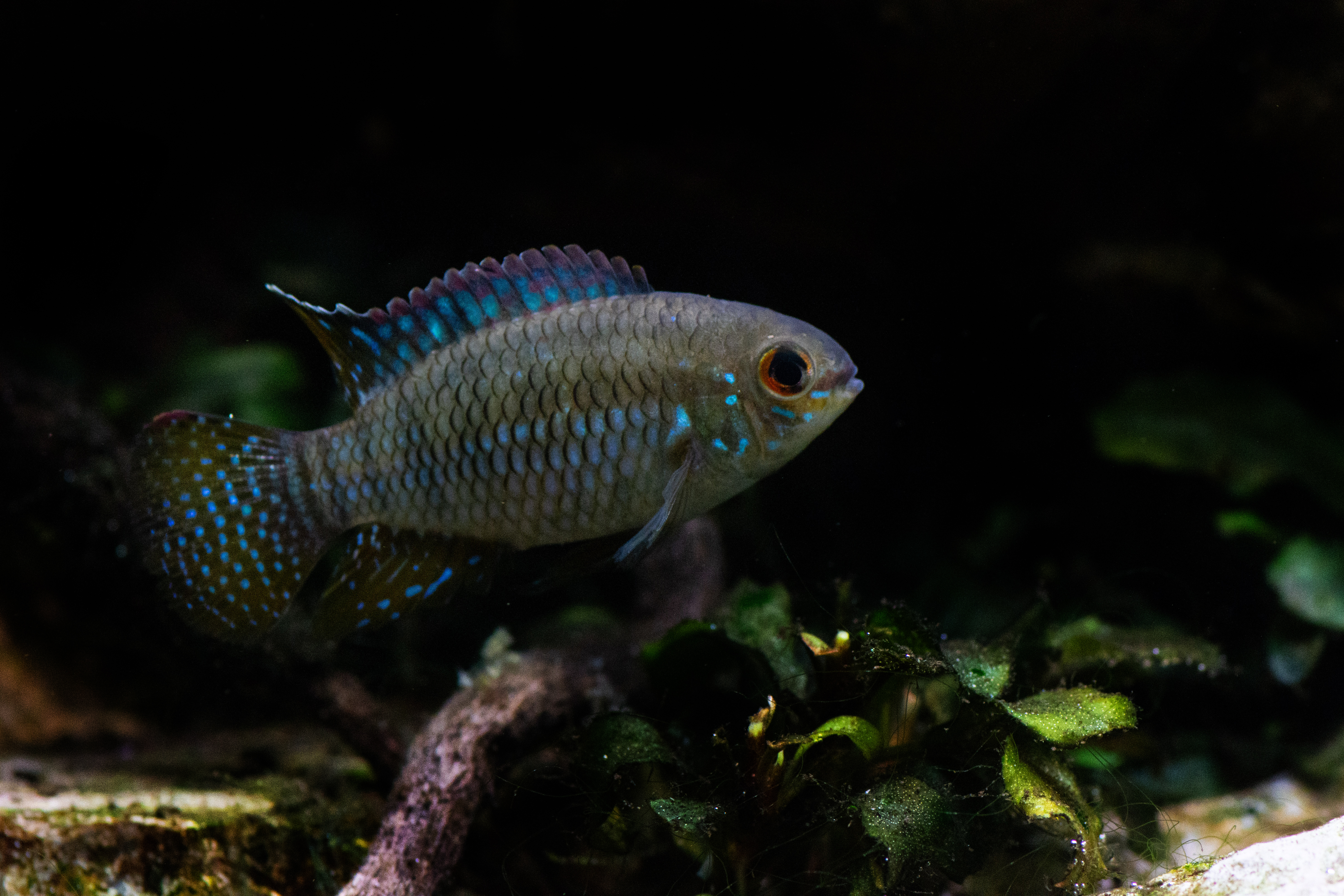

Scientific classification
- Kingdom: Animalia
- Phylum: Chordata
- Class: Actinopterygii
- Order: Cichliformes
- Family: Cichlidae
- Genus: Laetacara
- Species: L. curviceps

Binomial name
- Laetacara curviceps (C. G. E. Ahl, 1923)

Synonyms
- Acara curviceps Ahl, 1923; Aequidens curviceps (Ahl, 1923); Parvacara curviceps (Ahl, 1923)

= Laetacara curviceps =

Species of fish

Laetacara curviceps, the Flag acara, Dwarf flag cichlid, is a species of cichlid that lives in slow-moving rivers and streams as well as ponds and lakes of the Amazon Basin. This species can reach a total length of 10 cm (4 in).

== In the aquarium ==
The species is very peaceful compared to most other cichlids, and will not uproot plants. They enjoy slightly soft and acidic water, but are generally tolerant of a range of conditions. Flag acaras are ideal for communities with other peaceful Amazon fish, such as tetras and apistos. Flag acaras are commonly kept in aquariums though they were more popular in the past; nowadays other dwarf cichlids like apistos and rams have become favorites

== Breeding ==
Flag acaras will pair up at a very young age, as small as one and a half inches. The fish will flare at each other when pairing up and will later swim together and breed. They usually stay with their mate for the rest of their lives. It does not take much to trigger the breeding of these fish. Simple good treatment is more than often enough, although warm and clean water and much live food will help. They will almost always lay their eggs on a flat surface, but may spawn directly on gravel.

After a few days the eggs will hatch and become wigglers. This is when the fish have hatched out of their eggs, but are still attached to the spawning surface, and feeding off of their yolk sacs, which are attached to their stomachs. After five to seven days of being wigglers, the fish have almost completely consumed their yolk sacs and become free swimming. They are very small, but can normally eat newborn brine shrimp as a first food. They can also be fed liquid fry food, which is available at most fish or pet stores.

The parents take equal guard shifts protecting the eggs, wigglers, and fry. As devoted as the parents are, they sometimes seem to get confused and eat their own eggs. If fearful for their brood's safety, the parents pick up the fry in their mouth and move them across the tank. They take turns moving the fry, one standing guard over the already moved young. The fry are protected by their parents until they are moderately large and can fend for themselves.

== See also ==
- List of freshwater aquarium fish species
