= Praia Grande crater =

Crater in the Santos Basin

- Location within Brazil
- Location: Santos Basin, São Paulo, Brazil; 25°38′50″S 45°37′30″W

Impact crater structure
- Confidence: Probable
- Diameter: 20 km (12 mi)
- Age: 85.8 to 83.5 Ma; Santonian
- Exposed: No
- Drilled: No

Praia Grande crater is a 20 kilometres (12 mi) diameter circular feature in the Santos Basin offshore Brazil. It is a possible impact crater that has been identified on 3D seismic by Petrobras in 2004. Further investigation is needed to obtain more information on the structure. The Russian Academy of Sciences lists the structure as a probable impact crater.

== Description ==
The Praia Grande crater is located in the Santos Basin, approximately 200 kilometres (120 mi) southeast from the coastline of São Paulo State, Brazil. The identification of this structure is based on the interpretation of three-dimensional seismic data, acquired and processed in 2004 for petroleum exploration in a Petrobras concession block in the Santos Basin. The principal morphological elements, imposed on Upper Cretaceous rocks, are a structural high in the center of the crater, an adjacent ring syncline, and, externally, several concentric circular listric normal faults.

The structure is apparently well preserved from erosion, measures around 20 kilometres (12 mi) in diameter, and is buried by 4 kilometres (13,000 ft) of rocks deposited after the impact time, which occurred in the Santonian (85.8 to 83.5 Ma). The central uplift is well defined, with a diameter of 4.5 kilometres (2.8 mi), which is surrounded by concentric annular troughs. Further investigation is needed to acquire data on shock metamorphism and shatter cones.

== See also ==
- List of possible impact structures on Earth
- List of impact craters in South America
- Santa Marta crater
