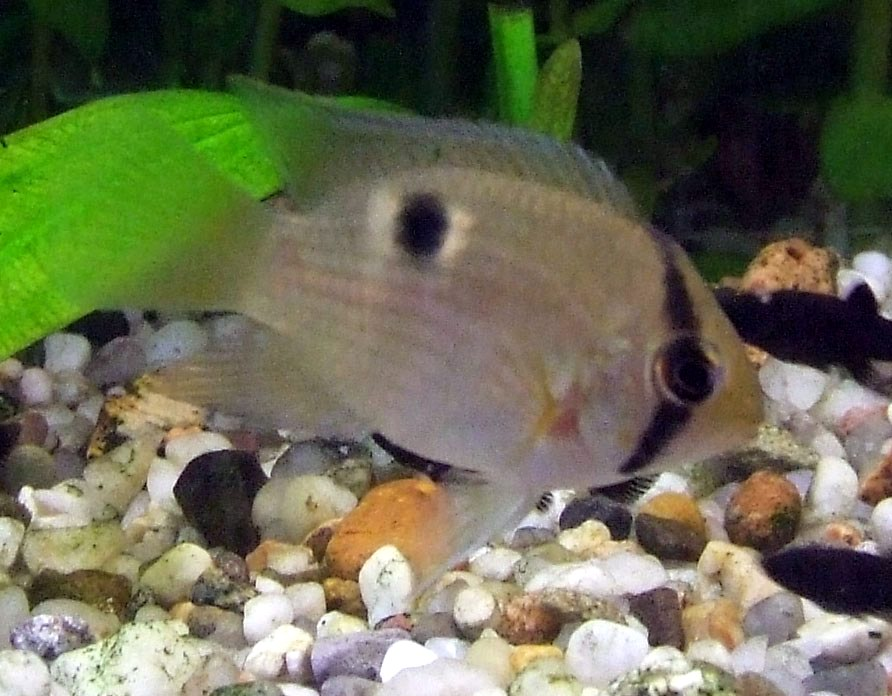

Conservation status
- Least Concern (IUCN 3.1)

Scientific classification
- Kingdom: Animalia
- Phylum: Chordata
- Class: Actinopterygii
- Order: Cichliformes
- Family: Cichlidae
- Subfamily: Cichlinae
- Tribe: Cichlasomatini
- Genus: Cleithracara
- Species: C. maronii

Binomial name
- Cleithracara maronii (Steindachner, 1881)

Synonyms
- Acara maronii Steindachner, 1881; Aequidens maronii (Steindachner, 1881)

= Keyhole cichlid =

Species of fish

The keyhole cichlid (Cleithracara maronii) is a cichlid fish endemic to tropical South America, occurring in the lower Orinoco Basin in Venezuela and river basins in The Guianas. It is the only species in the genus Cleithracara. The species is popular with fishkeeping hobbyists and is frequently kept in aquariums.

== Appearance ==
The species is a small tan coloured ovate-bodied fish. It has a black spot on its upper flank which sometimes extends into a short stripe. This gives rise to the common name, keyhole cichlid, from which the genus name Cleithracara (meaning "lock acara") is derived. When the species is startled or nervous it assumes a blotchy colouration and presses its body against rocks or logs in an attempt to camouflage itself. It is generally shy, peaceful and should not be kept with aggressive species.

== Reproduction and sexual dimorphism ==
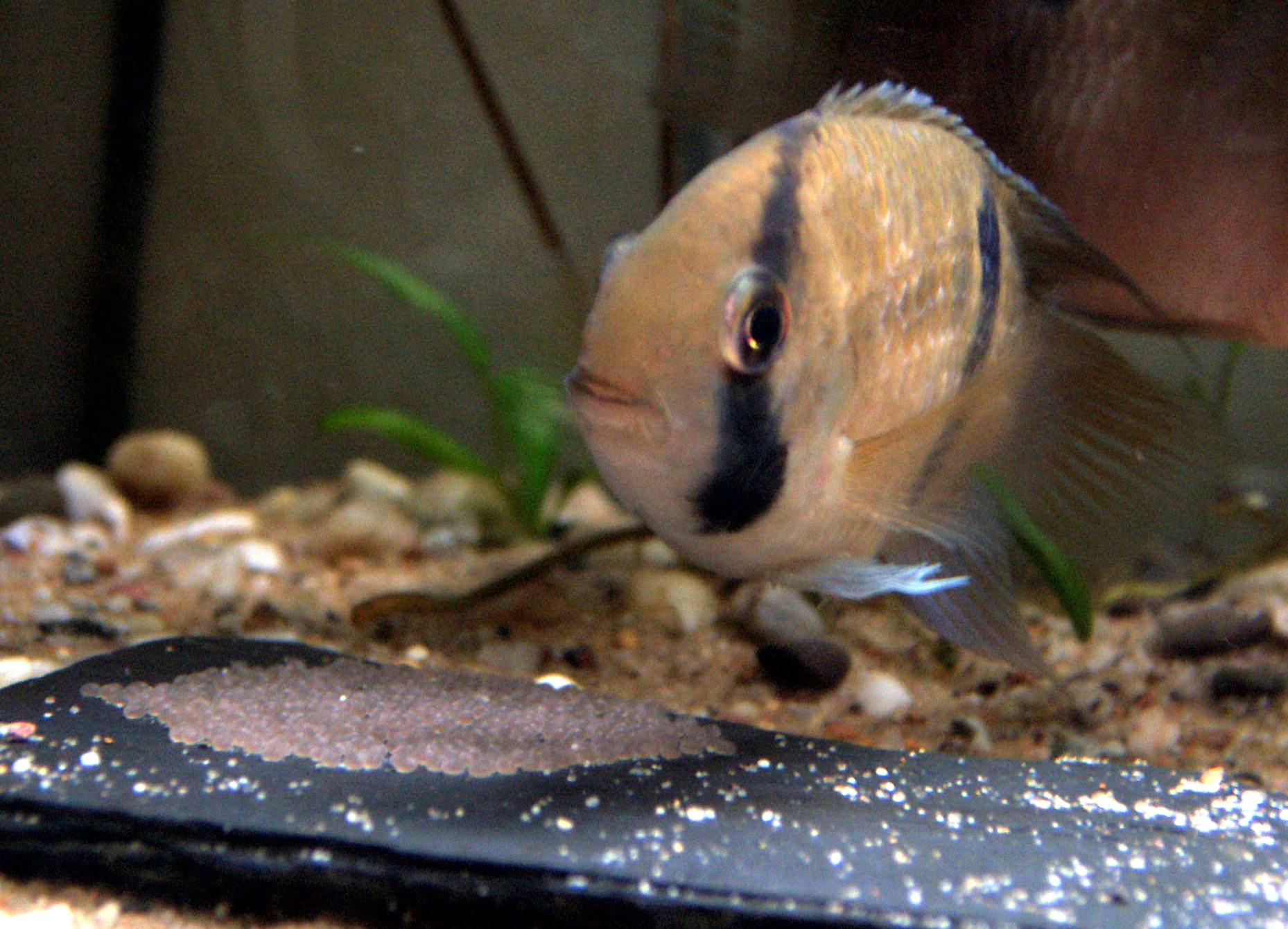
Keyhole cichlid with a clutch of eggs

It is a monogamous, biparentally custodial breeder which spawns on flattened rocks, logs or leaves. Clutch size ranges from 300-400 eggs that are tended by both the male and female. The sexes are difficult to distinguish, though some males have a longer and more pointed dorsal fin. There has been a sighting of a keyhole cichlid laying 1000 eggs.

== Diet ==
The species feeds on crustaceans, insects and other invertebrates.

== In the aquarium ==
The species is suitable for the community aquarium and will accept a wide variety of prepared fish food in captivity. The environment in aquaria should mimic the natural habitat of the species and include plants and numerous hiding places. It will also eat beetles that have been dropped in the tank.

== See also ==
- List of freshwater aquarium fish species
