= Cardiovascular Toxicology =

- Discipline: Toxicology, cardiology
- Language: English
- Edited by: Y. James Kang

Publication details
- History: 2001–present
- Publisher: Springer Science+Business Media
- Frequency: Quarterly
- Impact factor: 3.239 (2020)

Standard abbreviations
- ISO 4: Cardiovasc. Toxicol.

Indexing
- CODEN: CTAOAT
- ISSN: 1530-7905 (print); 1559-0259 (web)
- LCCN: 00214948
- OCLC no.: 44480657

Links
- Journal homepage; Online archive

Cardiovascular Toxicology is a quarterly peer-reviewed scientific journal covering molecular aspects of cardiovascular disease. It was established in 2001 and is published by Springer Science+Business Media. The editor-in-chief is Y. James Kang (University of Louisville School of Medicine). According to the Journal Citation Reports, the journal has a 2020 impact factor of 3.239.
