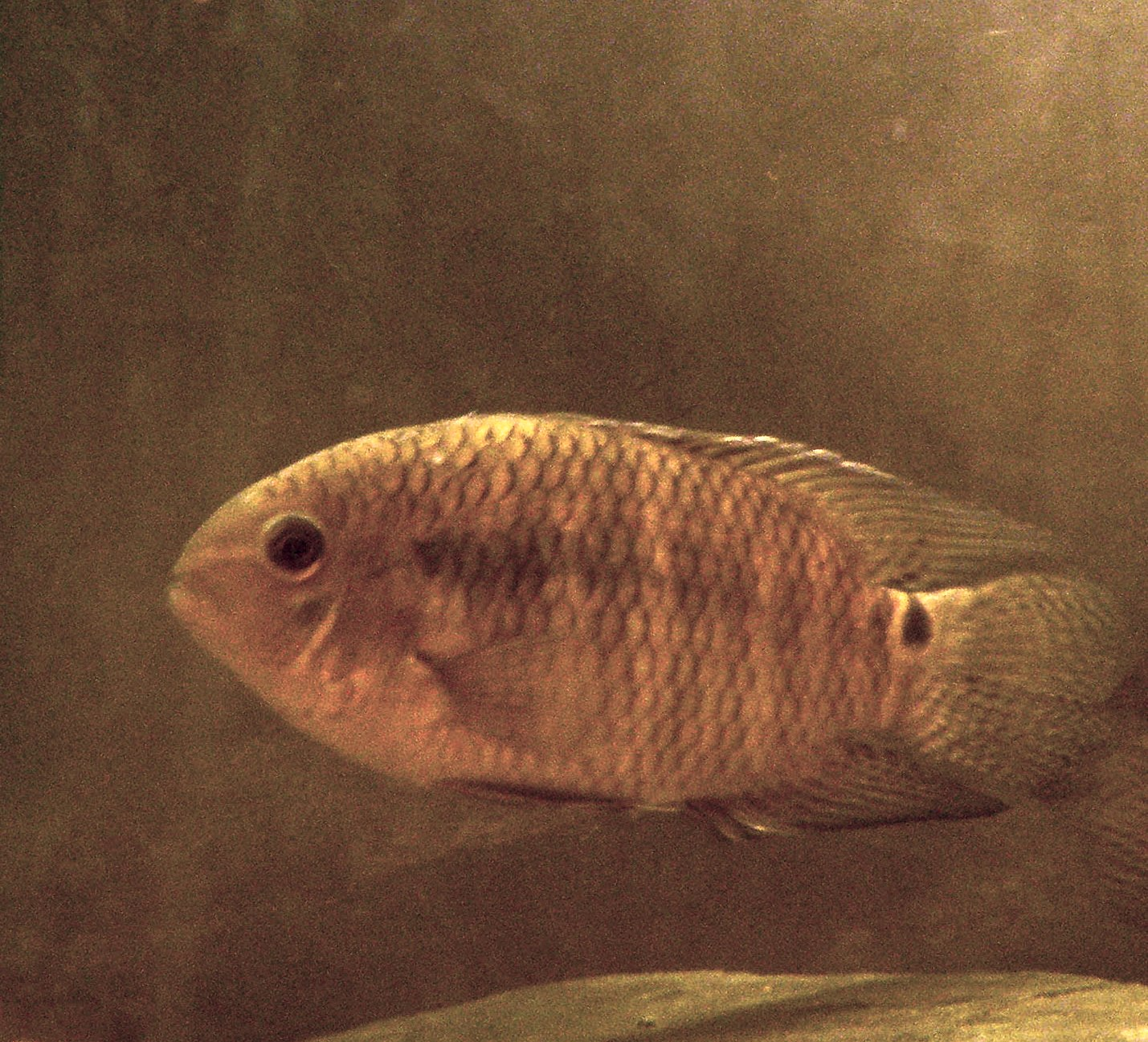
- Chiclasoma dimerus

Scientific classification
- Kingdom: Animalia
- Phylum: Chordata
- Class: Actinopterygii
- Order: Cichliformes
- Family: Cichlidae
- Subfamily: Cichlinae
- Tribe: Cichlasomatini; S.O. Kullander, 1998

Type genus
- Cichlasoma Swainson, 1839

= Cichlasomatini =

Cichlasomatini Temporal range: 34–0 Ma

Tribe of fishes

Cichlastomatini is a tribe of cichlids from South America, one of two tribes that make up the subfamily Cichlasomatinae. They were recognised in 1983 as an assemblage by the Swedish ichthyologist Sven O. Kullander by their four rather than five 5 dentary foramina in the lateralis canal system of the head, describing them as closely related to the genus Cichlasoma. Melanie Stiassny suggested that these fishes recognised as a clade by Kullander were divided into two groupings in 1991 which she termed cichlasomines and heroines, Kullander formally raised these to the tribes Cichlasomatini and Heroini of the subfamily Cichlasomatinae in 1999. In other classifications the tribe Cichlasomatini is placed in the subfamily Cichlinae.

== Characteristics ==
The members of the Cichlasomatini are characterised most obviously by the possession of relatively large scales, especially shown in the arrangement of the scales in front of the dorsal fin where there are eight scales along midline rather than over 10 scales. Stiassny posited in 1991 that laying eggs in a tight circular clutch was a synapomorphy of the cichlasomines.

== Genera ==
The following genera are considered to be classified under the tribe Cichlasomatini:

- Acaronia Myers, 1940
- Aequidens C. H. Eigenmann & W. L. Bray, 1894
- Andinoacara Musilová, Říčan & Novák, 2009
- Bujurquina S. O. Kullander, 1986
- Cichlasoma Swainson, 1839
- Cleithracara S. O. Kullander & Nijssen 1989
- Ivanacara Römer & Hahn, 2006
- Krobia S. O. Kullander & Nijssen, 1989
- Laetacara S. O. Kullander, 1986
- Nannacara Regan, 1905
- Rondonacara Ottoni & Mattos, 2015
- Tahuantinsuyoa S. O. Kullander, 1986
- †Tremembichthys Silva Santos & Santos, 1993
