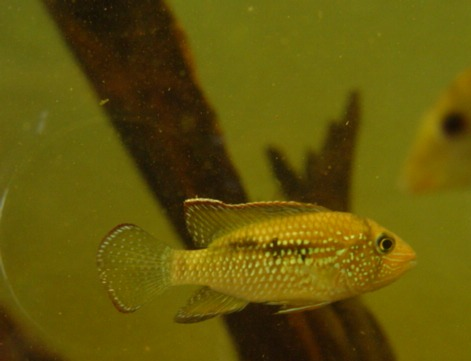
- T. macantzatza, male

Scientific classification
- Domain: Eukaryota
- Kingdom: Animalia
- Phylum: Chordata
- Class: Actinopterygii
- Order: Cichliformes
- Family: Cichlidae
- Tribe: Cichlasomatini
- Genus: Tahuantinsuyoa; S. O. Kullander, 1986

Type species
- Tahuantinsuyoa macantzatza S. O. Kullander, 1986

= Tahuantinsuyoa =

Genus of fishes

Tahuantinsuyoa is a small genus of cichlids endemic to Peru where they are found in the Amazon Basin.

== Species ==
There are currently two recognized species in this genus:

- Tahuantinsuyoa chipi S. O. Kullander, 1991
- Tahuantinsuyoa macantzatza S. O. Kullander, 1986
