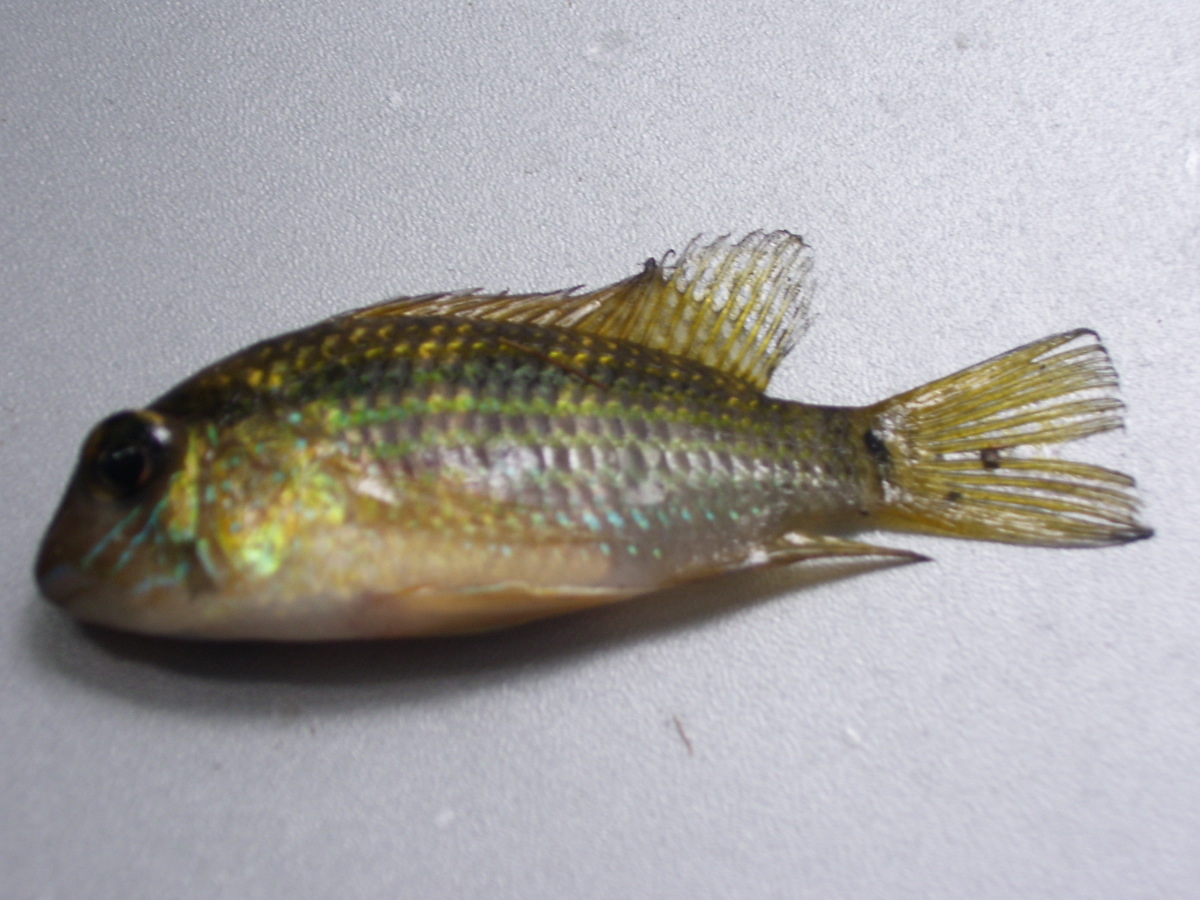
- Bujurquina syspilus

Scientific classification
- Kingdom: Animalia
- Phylum: Chordata
- Class: Actinopterygii
- Order: Cichliformes
- Family: Cichlidae
- Tribe: Cichlasomatini
- Genus: Bujurquina; S. O. Kullander, 1986

Type species
- Bujurquina moriorum S. O. Kullander, 1986

= Bujurquina =

Genus of fishes

Bujurquina is a genus of cichlid fish endemic to South America. Most species in the genus are restricted to the western Amazon Basin. The only exceptions are B. mariae from the Orinoco Basin, and B. oenolaemus and B. vittata from the Paraguay–Paraná Basin.

== Species ==
There are 19 recognized species in this genus:

- Bujurquina apoparuana S. O. Kullander, 1986
- Bujurquina beniensis M. Careaga, 2023
- Bujurquina cordemadi S. O. Kullander, 1986
- Bujurquina eurhinus S. O. Kullander, 1986
- Bujurquina hophrys S. O. Kullander, 1986
- Bujurquina huallagae S. O. Kullander, 1986
- Bujurquina labiosa S. O. Kullander, 1986
- Bujurquina mabelae M. Careaga, 2023
- Bujurquina mariae C. H. Eigenmann, 1922
- Bujurquina megalospilus S. O. Kullander, 1986
- Bujurquina moriorum S. O. Kullander, 1986
- Bujurquina oenolaemus S. O. Kullander, 1987
- Bujurquina omagua Říčan & Říčanová, 2023
- Bujurquina ortegai S. O. Kullander, 1986
- Bujurquina pardus Arbour, Barriga S. & López-Fernández, 2014
- Bujurquina peregrinabunda S. O. Kullander, 1986
- Bujurquina robusta S. O. Kullander, 1986
- Bujurquina syspilus Cope, 1872
- Bujurquina tambopatae S. O. Kullander, 1986
- Bujurquina vittata Heckel, 1840
- Bujurquina zamorensis Regan, 1905
