= Rebecca Copin =

Attempted murderer

Rebecca Copin (born Rebecca W. Cobb on August 5, 1796 in Kanawha, Virginia – died May 10, 1881 in Kanawha County, West Virginia) is known for allegedly attempting to poison her husband, John Copin, with arsenic. In addition, according to John Copin's petition for divorce in 1835, she also scalded him with boiling water, threatened to shoot him, and beat him with his own crutches when his leg was broken.

While arsenic poisoning was known as a common way for wives to kill husbands in England in the early to mid 1800s, Rebecca Copin's case is one of the earliest documented cases of attempted murder by a wife of her husband using arsenic in the United States, and also an early documented case of domestic violence in the legal system of the United States.

While the jury found that Rebecca Copin had indeed tried to murder John Copin, John Copin's petition for divorce was not granted. The jury also did not address any of the factors that may have led Rebecca Copin to attempt to murder John Copin.
