= Vichada Structure =

Coordinates: 4°30′N 69°15′W

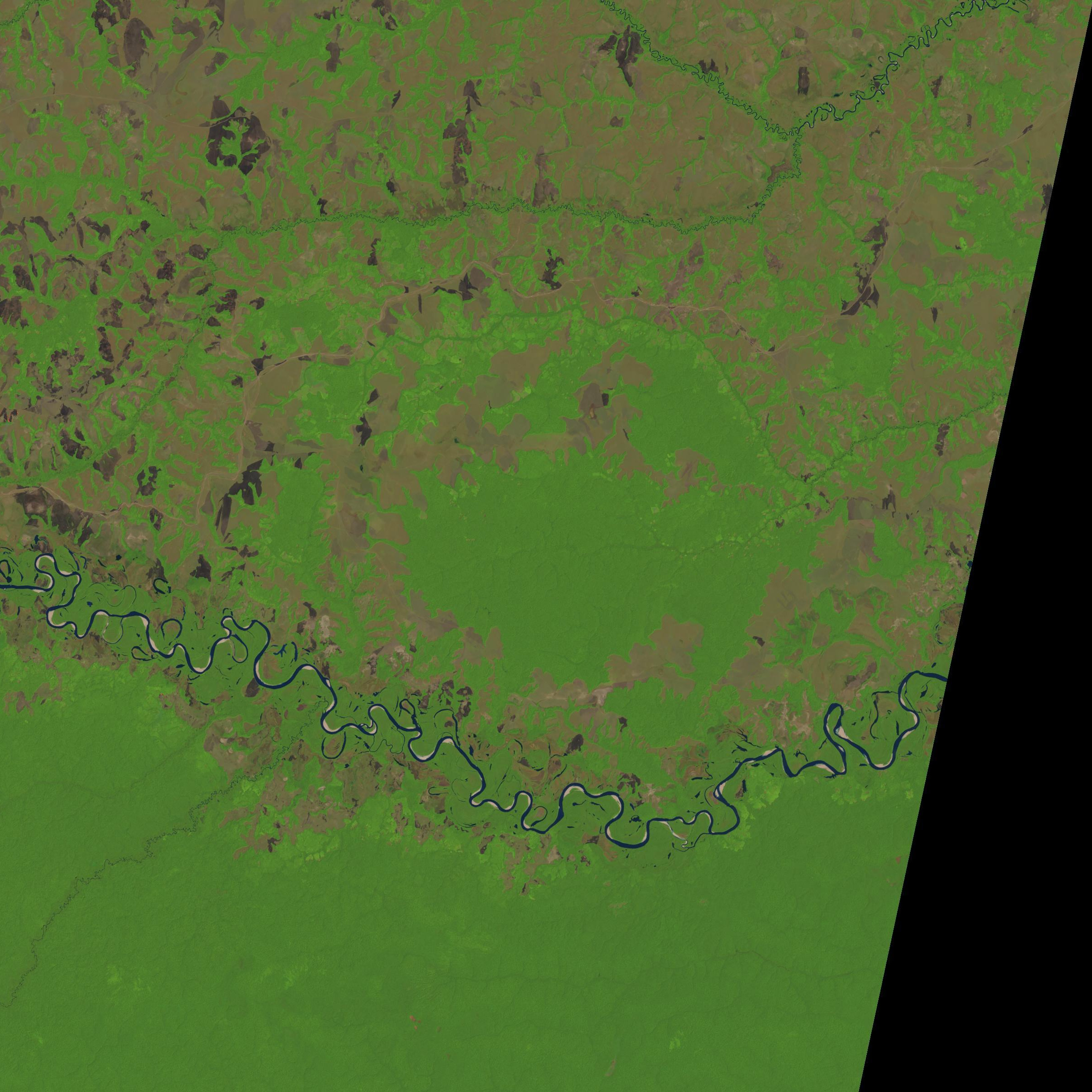
- 2016 Landsat image of the Vichada Structure
- Location: Colombia

Impact crater structure
- Confidence: Probable

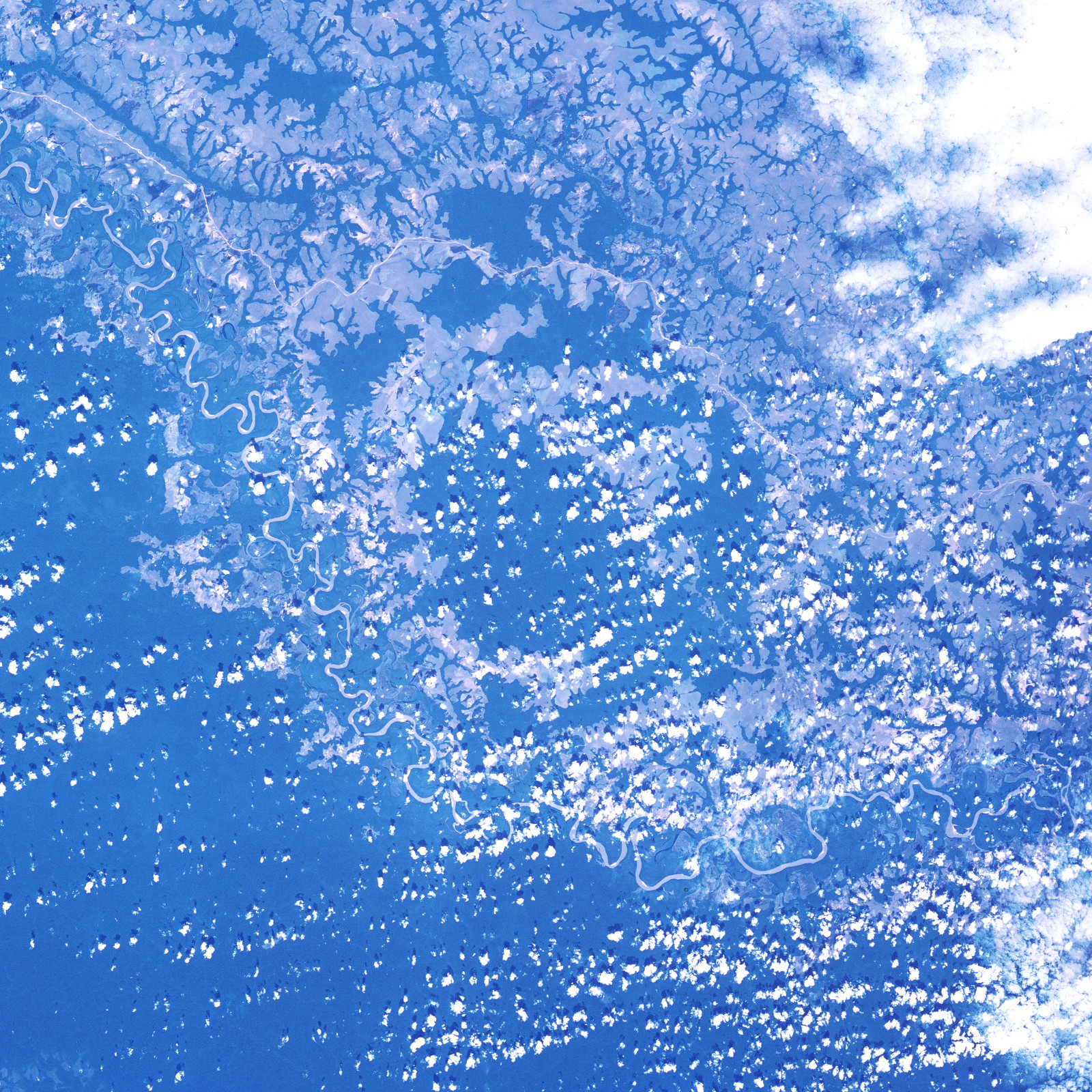
1973 Skylab image of the Vichada Structure

The Vichada Structure is a probable impact structure along the Vichada River in Colombia (Vichada Department), South America. It is most likely the largest impact structure in South America.

The structure was discovered in 2004 by Max Rocca, a geologist in Buenos Aires, by examining Landsat imagery. He was supported by a grant from the Planetary Society. The structure consists of a central flat depression surrounded by two concentric rings of hills of approximately 30 and 50 km diameter. The Vichada River anomalously flows around the outer ring of hills. An international team of scientists collected aerial gravity data over the 50 km wide structure and discovered a positive free-air anomaly at the center of the structure, supporting its interpretation as an impact structure.

== See also ==
- List of impact craters in South America
- List of possible impact structures on Earth
