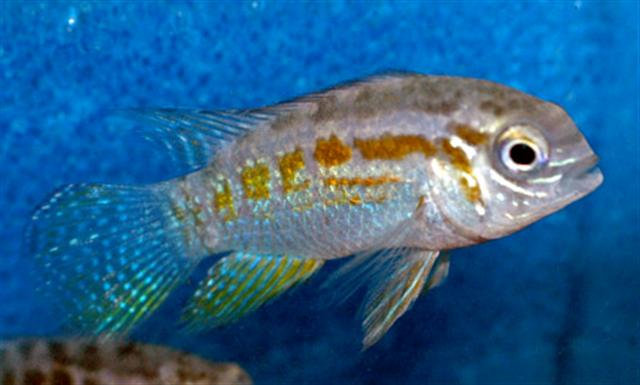
- Laetacara araguaiae

Scientific classification
- Kingdom: Animalia
- Phylum: Chordata
- Class: Actinopterygii
- Division: Teleostei
- Order: Cichliformes
- Family: Cichlidae
- Tribe: Cichlasomatini
- Genus: Laetacara; S. O. Kullander, 1986

Type species
- Acara flavilabris Cope, 1870

= Laetacara =

Genus of fishes

Laetacara is a small genus of cichlids native to freshwater habitats in tropical and subtropical South America, ranging from the upper Orinoco River basin in Venezuela to the Paraná River basin, Argentina, including the Amazon Basin from Peru to the Atlantic coast of Brazil and north through the Amapá State to just beyond the border with French Guiana. The genus is also collectively known as the smiling acaras. Like all cichlids, Laetacara species have well-developed brood care.

All members of the genus are monogamous, open spawning cichlids. They are popular in the fishkeeping hobby and are frequently kept in aquariums. Laetacara are relatively small cichlids, growing to about 4–12 cm (1.6–4.7 in) in length depending on exact species, and are part of the group known to aquarists as dwarf cichlids.

== Species ==
There are currently seven recognized species in this genus:

- Laetacara araguaiae Ottoni & W. J. E. M. Costa, 2009
- Laetacara curviceps (C. G. E. Ahl, 1923) (Flag acara)
- Laetacara dorsigera (Heckel, 1840) (Redbreast acara)
- Laetacara flamannellus Ottoni et al., 2012
- Laetacara flavilabris (Cope, 1870)
- Laetacara fulvipinnis Staeck & I. Schindler, 2007
- Laetacara thayeri (Steindachner, 1875)

== See also ==
- List of freshwater aquarium fish species
