= Vichada River =

Coordinates: 4°56′28″N 67°50′39″W

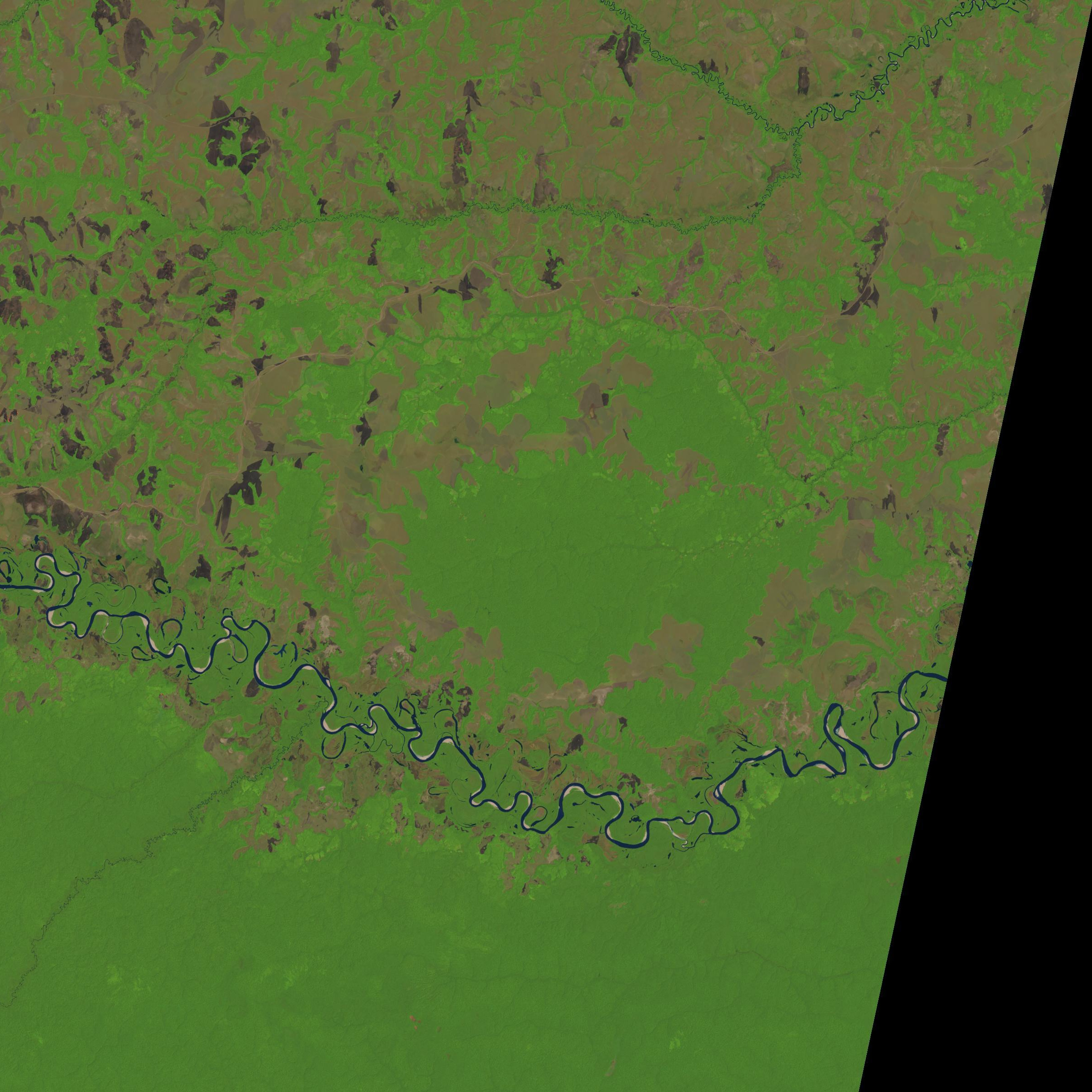
- Landsat image of the Vichada Structure

Location
- Country: Colombia

Physical characteristics
- Length: 580 km (360 mi)
- Basin size: 26,212 km^{2} (10,121 sq mi)
- Discharge
  - location: Confluence of Orinoco, Columbia
  - average: 1,290 m^{3}/s (46,000 cu ft/s)

The Vichada River (Spanish: Río Vichada, Spanish pronunciation: [ˈri.o βiˈ tʃaða]) is a blackwater river in Colombia, South America. It flows into the Orinoco River.

The eastward course of the Vichada is offset by an impact structure, called the Vichada Structure. The structure is most likely the largest impact structure in South America.
