= Riachão Ring =

Meteorite impact crater in Brazil

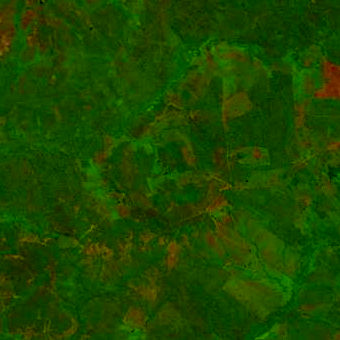
- Landsat image of the Riachão Ring (2017)

- Location within Brazil
- Location: Parnaíba Basin, Maranhão, Brazil; 7°43′S 46°39′W

Impact crater structure
- Confidence: Confirmed
- Diameter: 4.5 km (2.8 mi)
- Age: <200 Ma
- Exposed: Yes
- Drilled: No

The Riachão Ring is a meteorite impact crater in Brazil. It lies within the Parnaíba Basin. It is 4.5 kilometres (2.8 mi) in diameter and the age is estimated to be less than 200 million years (Jurassic or younger). The crater is exposed at the surface.

The structure was first identified from analysis of orbital photographs acquired during the Apollo–Soyuz Test Project in 1975. A reconnaissance investigation of the structure was reported by J. F. McHone in 1977. The structure of the site (dipping breccia along the rim) supported the interpretation of an impact origin, but no shatter cones or shocked quartz were found at the time.

The crater is severely eroded and there is apparently no ejecta remaining. The crater rim rises about 50 metres (160 ft) above the surrounding surface, and a central uplift is about 30 metres (98 ft) above the annular depression within the rim. Shock deformation has been identified in quartz grains within the central uplift.

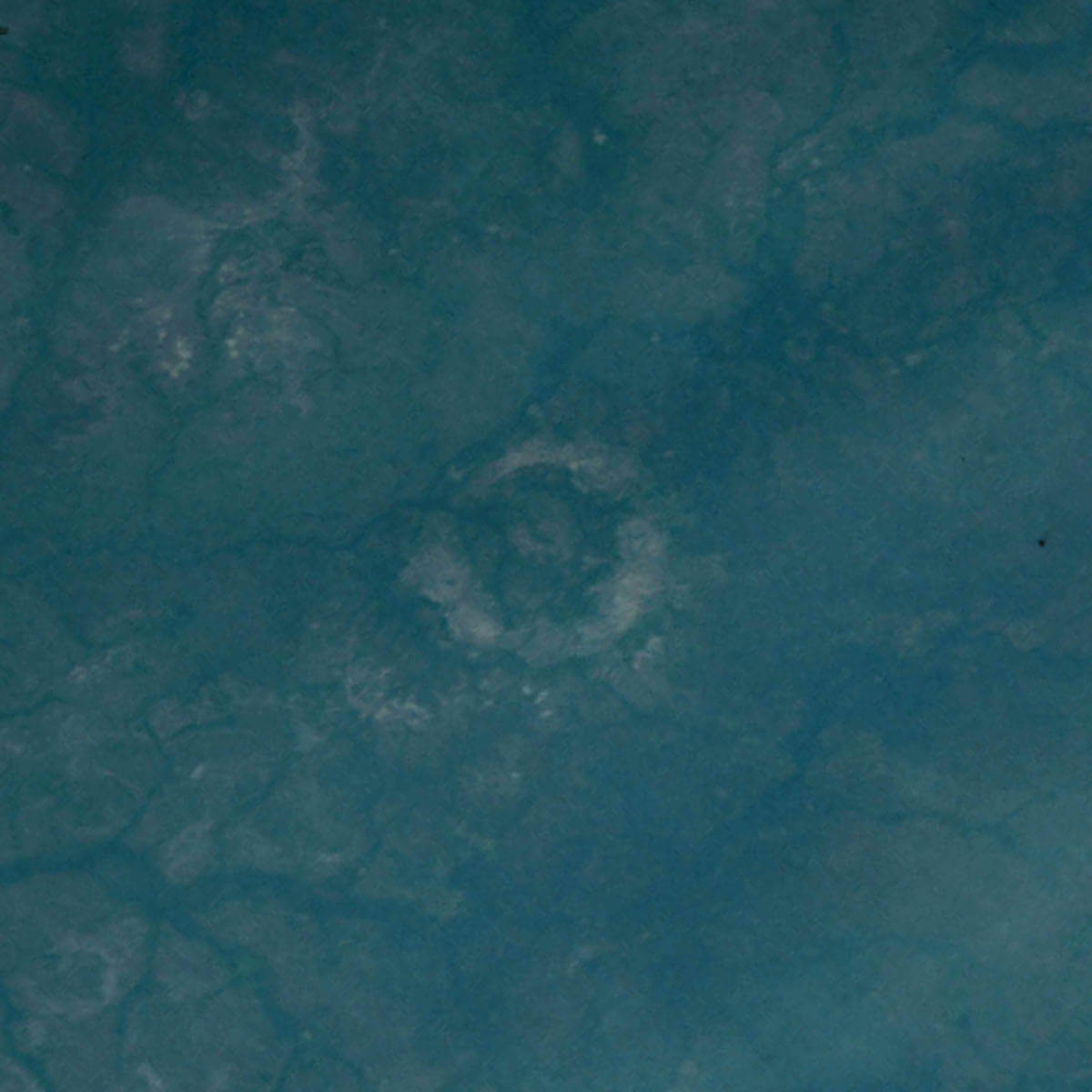
Part of 1975 discovery photo (AST-23-1931) of the Riachão Ring, by astronauts of the Apollo–Soyuz Test Project

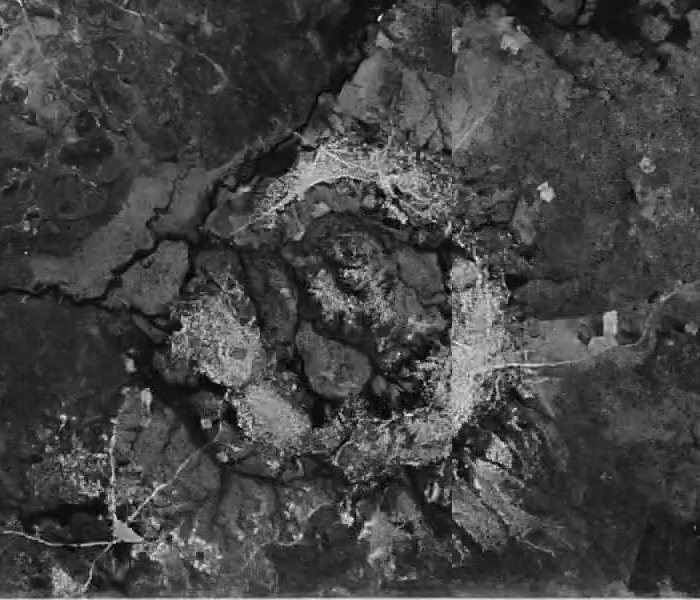
1978 panoramic camera subframe
