= Santa Marta crater =

Impact crater in Brazil

- Location within Brazil
- Location: Parnaíba Basin, Piauí, Brazil; 10°10′S 45°15′W

Impact crater structure
- Confidence: Confirmed
- Diameter: 10 km (6.2 mi)
- Age: ~66-100 Ma; Late Cretaceous
- Exposed: Yes
- Drilled: No

Santa Marta crater is a confirmed impact crater in Piauí State, northeastern Brazil. It is 10 kilometres (6.2 mi) in diameter and it is estimated to have formed between 100 and 66 Ma, during the Late Cretaceous.

== Description ==
Its impact origin was first proposed by S. Master and J. Heymann in 2000 based primarily on satellite remote sensing data and was confirmed more than a decade later after conclusive evidence of shock metamorphism such as breccia and shatter cones were found.

== See also ==
- Umm al Binni lake
