= Faxinal dos Guedes =

Municipality in Santa Catarina, Brazil

- Municipality
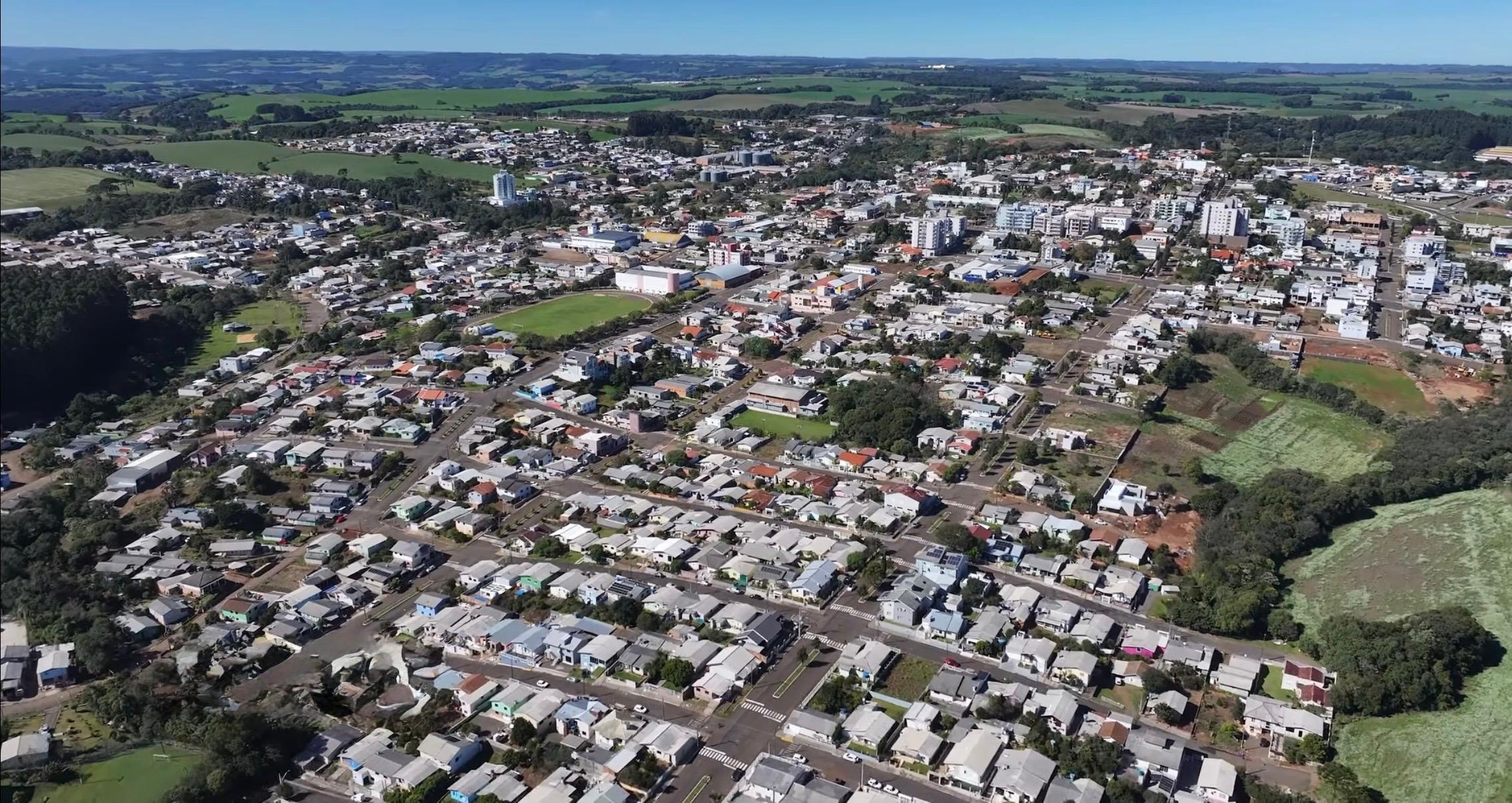

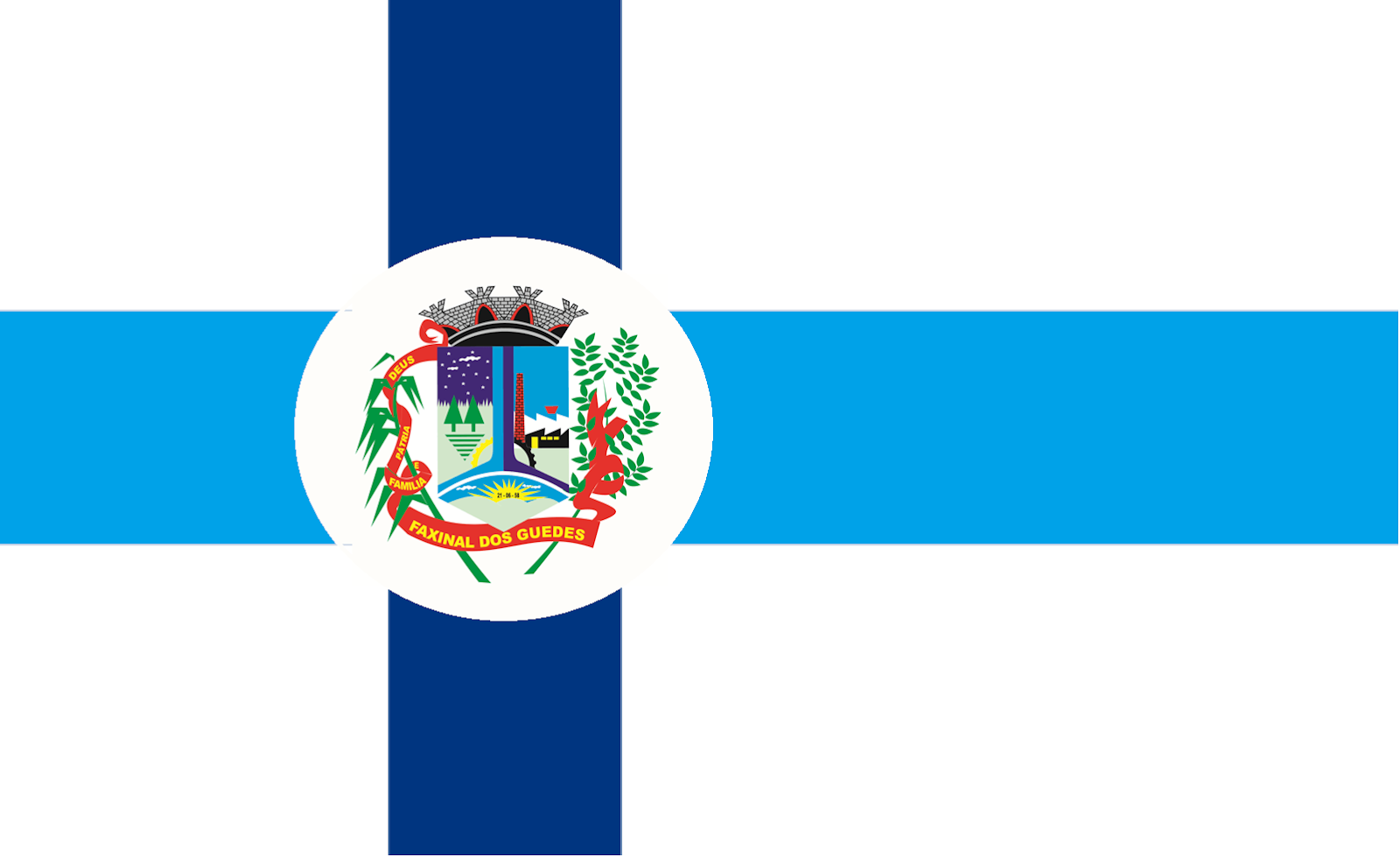
- Flag Coat of arms

- Location of Faxinal dos Guedes in Santa Catarina

- Location in Brazil
- Coordinates: 26°51′10″S 52°15′36″W
- Country: Brazil
- Region: South
- State: Santa Catarina
- Municipality created: 21 June 1958
- Installed: 26 July 1958
- Districts: Faxinal dos Guedes, Barra Grande

Government
  - Type: Mayor–council
  - Mayor: Jader Adriel Danielli (PSD)

Area
  - Municipality: 340.070 km^{2} (131.302 sq mi)
  - Urban: 4.15 km^{2} (1.60 sq mi)
- Elevation: 1,005 m (3,297 ft)

Population (2022 census)
  - Municipality: 11,192
  - Estimate (2026): 11,588
  - Density: 32.911/km^{2} (85.239/sq mi)
- Demonym: Faxinalense

GDP (2023)
  - Total: R$845.4 million
  - Per capita: R$75,534.94
- Time zone: UTC−3 (BRT)
- Postal code (CEP): 89694-000
- HDI (2010): 0.758 – high
- Climate: Cfb
- Website: faxinal.sc.gov.br

Faxinal dos Guedes is a municipality in western Santa Catarina, in Brazil's South Region. Its population was estimated at 11,588 in 2026 by the Brazilian Institute of Geography and Statistics (IBGE). With an area of 340.07 km², part of its territory lies along the western rim of the Vargeão Dome, a meteorite impact structure.

It is one of the highest-elevation urban centers in Santa Catarina, with its urban area situated above 1,000 m. It is therefore locally known as the Capital dos Ventos ("Capital of the Winds"). Under the IBGE's regional classification, it belongs to the Xanxerê Immediate Geographic Region and the Chapecó Intermediate Geographic Region. It is also included in the expansion area of the Metropolitan Region of Chapecó and lies about 495 km from the state capital, Florianópolis.

Its economy is based on industry, particularly paper and packaging production, and on agriculture, especially maize and soybean cultivation.

== Etymology ==
The element Faxinal refers to the vegetation historically found in the area, known as Floresta de Faxinais ("faxinal forest"), an open formation associated with Mixed Ombrophilous Forest. It is characterized by scattered Araucaria trees and an understory containing species such as guamirins, caúnas, yerba mate and bamboo.

The element Guedes derives from the Guedes Ramos family, landowners in the region in the early 20th century, particularly Antônio José and Estevão Guedes Ramos. The place name therefore combines the characteristic vegetation of the area with the surname of the family that owned land where the settlement developed. The name Faxinal dos Guedes already appears in documents from 1905, when it was one of the administrative sections of the Generosópolis Police District.

== History ==
=== Indigenous occupation ===
Archaeological evidence found in the present-day territory of Faxinal dos Guedes and in the valleys of the Irani and Chapecozinho rivers records ancient occupations associated with Southern Jê peoples. The archaeological record includes stone artifacts, ceramic fragments and subterranean structures; ceramic assemblages of the Taquara/Itararé tradition are associated with Jê occupation of the southern Brazilian plateau.

The Southern Jê are related to the ancestry of the present-day Kaingang and Laklãnõ-Xokleng peoples. In western Santa Catarina, historical Indigenous presence is particularly associated with the Kaingang, who remain in the region, including in the Xapecó Indigenous Territory in the present-day municipalities of Ipuaçu and Entre Rios.

=== Settlement and territorial formation ===
Through much of the 19th century, the region was inhabited by Indigenous peoples and caboclo communities engaged, among other activities, in livestock raising and the extraction of yerba mate. In 1882, the imperial government established the Xapecó Military Colony, with its headquarters at Campina do Xanxerê, in territory then belonging to the Paraná Province. Its area included parts of the present-day municipalities of Xanxerê, Xaxim and Faxinal dos Guedes.

Historical affiliations
Xapecó Military Colony — Paraná	1882–1908
Generosópolis Police District	1905–1916
Area of the municipality of Chapecó	1917–1919
District of Faxinal dos Guedes — Chapecó	1919–1943
Federal Territory of Iguaçu	1943–1946
District of Faxinal dos Guedes — Chapecó	1946–1953
District of Faxinal dos Guedes — Xanxerê	1954–1958

The colony brought together military personnel and civilians from different parts of Brazil. In the 1890 census, 332 of its 522 inhabitants were born in Paraná, while the military contingent included men from several Brazilian provinces. The colony was established in the context of the territorial dispute between Brazil and Argentina known as the Palmas Question, settled in 1895 through arbitration by United States president Grover Cleveland.

In 1905, the Paraná government created the Generosópolis Police District, which encompassed the territory of the Military Colony and was divided into nine administrative sections, including Xanxerê, Faxinal dos Guedes and Xaxim. After the Military Colony was dissolved in 1908, the region remained under Paraná administration.

In 1916, the boundary agreement between Paraná and Santa Catarina definitively incorporated the region into Santa Catarina. The municipality of Chapecó was created the following year, and the area of Faxinal dos Guedes became part of it. On 10 July 1919, the district of Faxinal dos Guedes was officially created as a subdivision of Chapecó.

Between 1943 and 1946, Chapecó and its districts formed part of the Federal Territory of Iguaçu, after which they returned to Santa Catarina. In 1953, when the municipality of Xanxerê was created, the districts of Xanxerê, Abelardo Luz and Faxinal dos Guedes were detached from Chapecó and incorporated into the new municipality.

=== Colonization, urban development and municipal emancipation ===
Corner of São João Ave. and Santa Catarina St. in 1948. Collection: Jorge Migliorini.

Parish church of Faxinal dos Guedes in 1960. Collection: Jorge Migliorini.

From the 1940s onward, migration from Rio Grande do Sul intensified, especially among descendants of Italian and German immigrants, who joined the caboclo population already established in the region. Families recorded among the settlers include Barcelos, Santin, Antoniolli, Fachinello, Migliorini, Pompermayer and Scheis.

In 1942, Migliorini, Grando & Cia. Ltda., Fioravante Massolini and Colonizadora Cruzeiro began selling lots from the Ressaca and Cerca Velha estates and other properties in the region. During the same period, the first school in the settlement was built; it also served as a Catholic church.

Around 1943, Migliorini, Grando & Cia. Ltda. opened the first streets and avenues. A commercial establishment opened by Vergílio Barcelos and the first sawmill were also established. The main economic activities of the period included native timber extraction, particularly Araucaria logging, and the cultivation of maize and wheat. Clube Recreativo Itagiba, one of the settlement's earliest social institutions, was founded on 7 November 1943.

The first recorded district authorities were Antônio Firminiano Pereira, as sub-prefect, and Francisco Brito de Miranda, as clerk of the peace.

On 21 June 1958, State Law No. 348 created the municipality of Faxinal dos Guedes from territory detached from Xanxerê. The municipality was formally installed on 26 July that year. Alexandre Antoniolli was appointed the first mayor, and Antônio Domingos Migliorini became the first elected mayor, taking office on 31 January 1959.

On 16 February 1959, the district of Vargeão was created within Faxinal dos Guedes. In 1964, Vargeão was separated from Faxinal dos Guedes and became a municipality under State Law No. 954. On 15 May of the same year, the district of Barra Grande was created and annexed to Faxinal dos Guedes by State Law No. 963. Since then, the municipality has comprised the districts of Faxinal dos Guedes, which contains the municipal seat, and Barra Grande.

Aerial view of Faxinal dos Guedes in 1957.
Collection: Wellinton Azzolini Farias; SEPLAN-SC.

Aerial view of Faxinal dos Guedes in 1978.
Collection: Wellinton Azzolini Farias; SEPLAN-SC.

== Geography ==
Faxinal dos Guedes is located in western Santa Catarina and has a territorial area of 340.07 km². The municipal seat lies at an elevation of about 1,005 metres, making it one of the highest urban settlements in the state. Under the IBGE's 2017 regional division, the municipality is part of the Xanxerê Immediate Geographic Region and the Chapecó Intermediate Geographic Region. It is also included in the expansion area of the Metropolitan Region of Chapecó.

It borders Abelardo Luz and Ouro Verde to the north, Ipumirim and Xavantina to the south, Vargeão to the east, and Xanxerê and Bom Jesus to the west. The municipal territory is roughly elongated north–south and occupies part of the plateau of western Santa Catarina, an area characterized by high elevations and valleys associated with the Irani and Chapecozinho river basins.

=== Geology and relief ===
Faxinal dos Guedes lies within the volcanic domain of the Paraná Basin. Its bedrock formed during the Early Cretaceous, when extensive lava flows produced the Serra Geral Group. Basalts and andesites of the Paranapanema Formation predominate, together with felsic volcanic rocks of the Chapecó Formation, including dacites, rhyodacites and rhyolites, and smaller occurrences of the Campos Novos Formation.

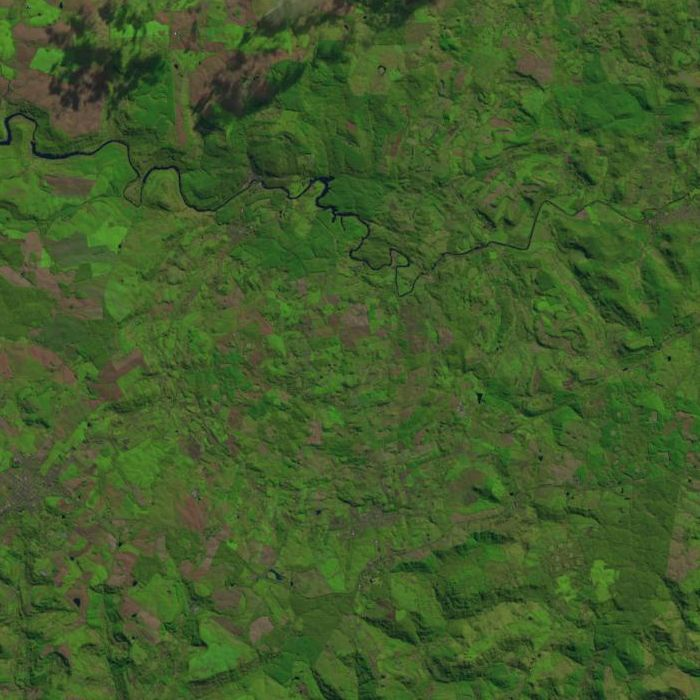
Satellite image of the Vargeão Dome, whose western rim reaches the eastern part of Faxinal dos Guedes.

In the eastern part of the municipality, the terrain descends sharply toward the Vargeão Dome, an impact crater about 12 km in diameter that also extends into the municipalities of Vargeão and Passos Maia. The structure formed approximately 123 million years ago following the impact of a celestial body. The impact fractured and partially melted volcanic rocks of the Serra Geral Group and uplifted Botucatu and Pirambóia sandstones by about 700 metres, rocks that are normally buried beneath the volcanic sequence. These sandstones are remnants of the desert environment that occupied the region before Serra Geral volcanism. The exposure of these rocks and impact-related structures makes the Vargeão Dome an important site for geological and planetary-science research.

Relief is higher and gently rolling in the northern and central parts of the municipality and becomes more dissected toward the south, where incised valleys and steeper slopes are associated with drainage toward the Uruguay River basin. The municipal seat occupies an interfluve at about 1,005 metres above sea level, from which the terrain descends in several directions.

Under the Brazilian soil classification system, the main soil classes found in the municipality are Red Latosols, Brown Latosols and Litholic Neosols, with smaller areas of Red Nitosols.

=== Hydrography ===
Faxinal dos Guedes is part of the Uruguay River basin and its territory is divided mainly between the basins of the Chapecozinho River to the north and the Irani River to the south. The drainage divide crosses the municipality's higher ground, near the municipal seat and along the BR-282 highway, directing runoff toward the two river systems.

The Chapecozinho River crosses the northern part of the municipality, while the Irani River drains the south. Watercourses rising in or passing near the municipal seat include Arroio Grande, Córrego Burro Magro, Lajeado Cerca Velha and Arroio Jaguatirica. Arroio Grande crosses the urban area, while Córrego Burro Magro is the principal source used for the city's public water supply.

=== Vegetation ===
Mosaic of forest remnants, forestry plantations and agricultural land in rural Faxinal dos Guedes.

The original vegetation of Faxinal dos Guedes belongs to the Mixed Ombrophilous Forest, a formation of the Atlantic Forest characterized by the presence of Araucaria angustifolia. The municipality also contains Floresta de Faxinais, a relatively open forest formation with scattered Araucaria trees and an understory that includes guamirins, congonha, guaraperê, caúna, yerba mate and bamboo.

Much of the original forest cover was replaced during settlement by agriculture and commercial forestry, although remnants of Mixed Ombrophilous Forest remain across the municipality. A floristic survey in Faxinal dos Guedes recorded 36 tree and shrub species in one such fragment, including Dicksonia sellowiana and species locally known as canelas and guamirins.

=== Climate ===
Historical record of snowfall in Faxinal dos Guedes in 1965. Collection: Jorge Migliorini.

Faxinal dos Guedes has a Cfb climate, a humid subtropical climate with mild summers. Its high elevation, with the municipal seat at about 1,005 metres, results in lower temperatures than in lower-lying parts of western Santa Catarina. An agronomic study carried out at approximately 1,000 metres elevation in the municipality recorded a mean annual temperature of 16.4 °C, relative humidity of around 80%, and annual precipitation of approximately 2,100 mm.

Winters are cold, and the elevation favors occasional snowfall. Much of Faxinal dos Guedes lies within the area known as the Planalto da Neve ("Snow Plateau"), where elevation and atmospheric circulation make snowfall more likely in southern Brazil; most of the municipality lies above 900 metres, within the zone of greatest snowfall potential.

Climate data for Faxinal dos Guedes
Month	Jan	Feb	Mar	Apr	May	Jun	Jul	Aug	Sep	Oct	Nov	Dec	Year
Mean daily maximum °C (°F)	26.9 (80.4)	26.3 (79.3)	25.2 (77.4)	22.0 (71.6)	20.1 (68.2)	18.8 (65.8)	18.7 (65.7)	20.7 (69.3)	21.8 (71.2)	23.2 (73.8)	25.0 (77.0)	26.2 (79.2)	22.9 (73.2)
Daily mean °C (°F)	20.7 (69.3)	20.4 (68.7)	19.0 (66.2)	15.7 (60.3)	13.6 (56.5)	12.5 (54.5)	12.0 (53.6)	13.6 (56.5)	15.2 (59.4)	16.8 (62.2)	18.3 (64.9)	19.6 (67.3)	16.4 (61.5)
Mean daily minimum °C (°F)	14.6 (58.3)	14.5 (58.1)	12.9 (55.2)	9.4 (48.9)	7.1 (44.8)	6.2 (43.2)	5.3 (41.5)	6.5 (43.7)	8.7 (47.7)	10.4 (50.7)	11.6 (52.9)	13.0 (55.4)	10.0 (50.0)
Average precipitation mm (inches)	212 (8.3)	174 (6.9)	177 (7.0)	179 (7.0)	187 (7.4)	215 (8.5)	149 (5.9)	181 (7.1)	212 (8.3)	235 (9.3)	152 (6.0)	182 (7.2)	2,255 (88.8)
Source: Climate-Data.org

=== Administrative divisions ===
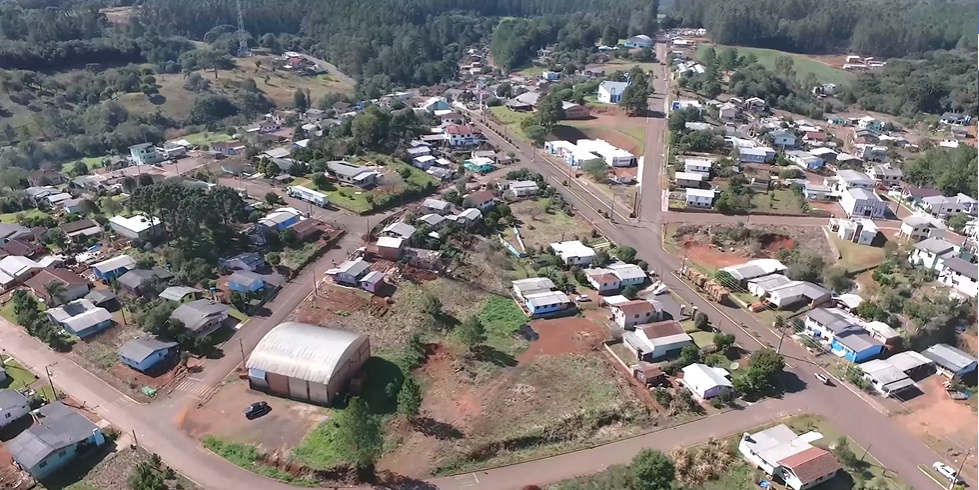
District of Barra Grande.

Faxinal dos Guedes comprises two districts: Faxinal dos Guedes, which contains the municipal seat, and Barra Grande. Barra Grande district was created by State Law No. 963 of 15 May 1964, which ratified Municipal Resolution No. 2/1963 and annexed the district to Faxinal dos Guedes.

In the seat district, Municipal Complementary Law No. 2 of 14 July 1999 established ten neighborhoods: Centro, São Cristóvão, Rosa, Ozelame, Antoniolli, São José, João José Gehlen, Bairro 1, Bairro 2 and Bairro 3. The urban area also includes subdivisions and localities commonly known by names such as Ervatal, Magarinos, Barella and Parque das Flores, among others.

== Demographics ==
Census population
Year	Population
1960	7,012
1970	6,594
1980	8,476
1991	9,266
2000	10,767
2010	10,661
2022	11,192
population 1960198020002022
Source: IBGE censuses.

In the 2022 Brazilian census, Faxinal dos Guedes had 11,192 inhabitants, up from 10,661 in 2010, an increase of approximately 5% over twelve years. Population density was 32.91 inhabitants per square kilometre. For 2026, the IBGE estimated the municipal population at 11,588.

Population growth was strongest between 1970 and 2000, when the population increased from 6,594 to 10,767. A slight decline occurred between 2000 and 2010, followed by renewed growth through 2022.

At the time of the 1960 census, Faxinal dos Guedes still included the district of Vargeão, which became a separate municipality in 1964.

=== Territorial distribution of the population ===
In 2022, 9,315 inhabitants lived in urban areas and 1,877 in rural areas, representing 83.2% and 16.8% of the municipal population, respectively. In 2010, the urban population was 7,718, or approximately 72.4% of the total, while 2,943 inhabitants lived in rural areas. The share of the population living in urban areas therefore increased between the two censuses.

Most inhabitants were concentrated in the district of Faxinal dos Guedes, which had 9,656 residents, or 86.3% of the municipal population. Barra Grande district had 1,536 inhabitants, or 13.7%.

Population by district — 2022 census
District	Urban	Rural	Total
Faxinal dos Guedes	8,022	1,634	9,656
Barra Grande	1,293	243	1,536
Municipality	9,315	1,877	11,192
Source: IBGE, 2022 census, aggregated by census tract.

The urban population of the municipal seat was distributed among the neighborhoods of São Cristóvão (1,394 inhabitants), Rosa (1,228), Centro (976), Bairro 1 (624), Ozelame (489), João José Gehlen (448), Antoniolli (396), Bairro 2 (392), São José (354) and Bairro 3 (206), with a further 1,515 inhabitants living in subdivisions and urban census tracts outside the legally defined neighborhood boundaries.

The ten legally established neighborhoods contained 6,507 inhabitants, while areas outside those boundaries accounted for 18.9% of the urban population of the seat district. These areas include subdivisions and localities commonly known as Ervatal, Magarinos, Barella and Parque das Flores. In 2022, urbanized areas covered 4.15 km².

Panoramic view of São João Avenue and central Faxinal dos Guedes.

=== Color or race and population history ===
Population by color or race (2022)
1. White (66.5%)
2. Brown (pardo) (31.4%)
3. Black (2.00%)
4. Indigenous (0.13%)
5. Asian (0.02%)

The Brazilian census uses self-declared categories of "color or race". In 2022, 7,439 residents of Faxinal dos Guedes identified as white (66.5%), 3,508 as brown (pardo) (31.4%), 224 as black (2.0%), 15 as Indigenous (0.1%) and 2 as Asian (less than 0.1%).

The area's population history includes early Indigenous occupation by Southern Jê peoples, associated with the ancestry of the present-day Kaingang and Laklãnõ-Xokleng. The region was later also occupied by caboclo communities engaged in agriculture, livestock raising and yerba-mate extraction, among other activities.

From the 1940s onward, migration from Rio Grande do Sul increased, including many descendants of Italian and German immigrants who settled alongside the existing population.

=== Migration ===
Migration played an important role in the formation of Faxinal dos Guedes. The caboclo population was joined by Brazilians from different regions associated with the Xapecó Military Colony and, particularly from the 1940s onward, by families from Rio Grande do Sul, including a significant presence of descendants of Italian and German immigrants.

Between 2017 and 2022, Faxinal dos Guedes recorded a slightly positive migration balance. Xanxerê was the principal municipality both of origin and destination for migrants; other important origins included Ponte Serrada, Vargeão, Abelardo Luz and Passos Maia, while Passos Maia, Vargeão and Chapecó were among the principal destinations of residents who left the municipality.

=== Religion ===
According to the 2022 census, 71.6% of residents identified as Roman Catholic and 25.6% as members of Evangelical denominations. People reporting no religion accounted for 1.4%; the census also recorded Spiritists (0.4%), adherents of Umbanda and Candomblé (0.3%), and followers of other religions (0.6%).

Catholicism has been present since the formation of the urban settlement: in the 1940s, the first local school also served as a church. The present São João Batista Parish, in the town center, belongs to the Archdiocese of Chapecó.

Evangelical denominations present in the municipality include the Assemblies of God, the Seventh-day Adventist Church and the Evangelical Lutheran Church.

São João Batista Parish Church.

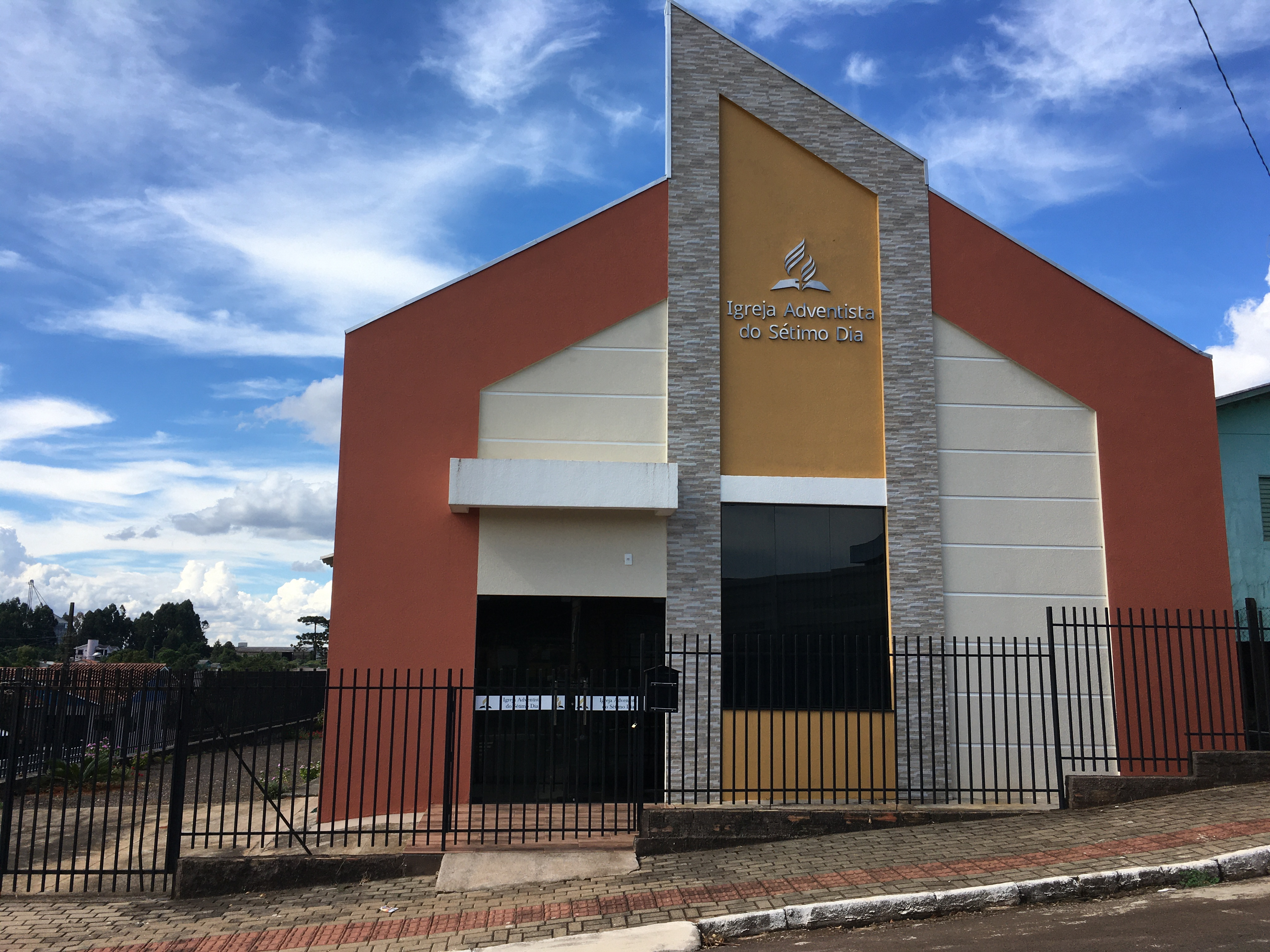
Seventh-day Adventist Church.

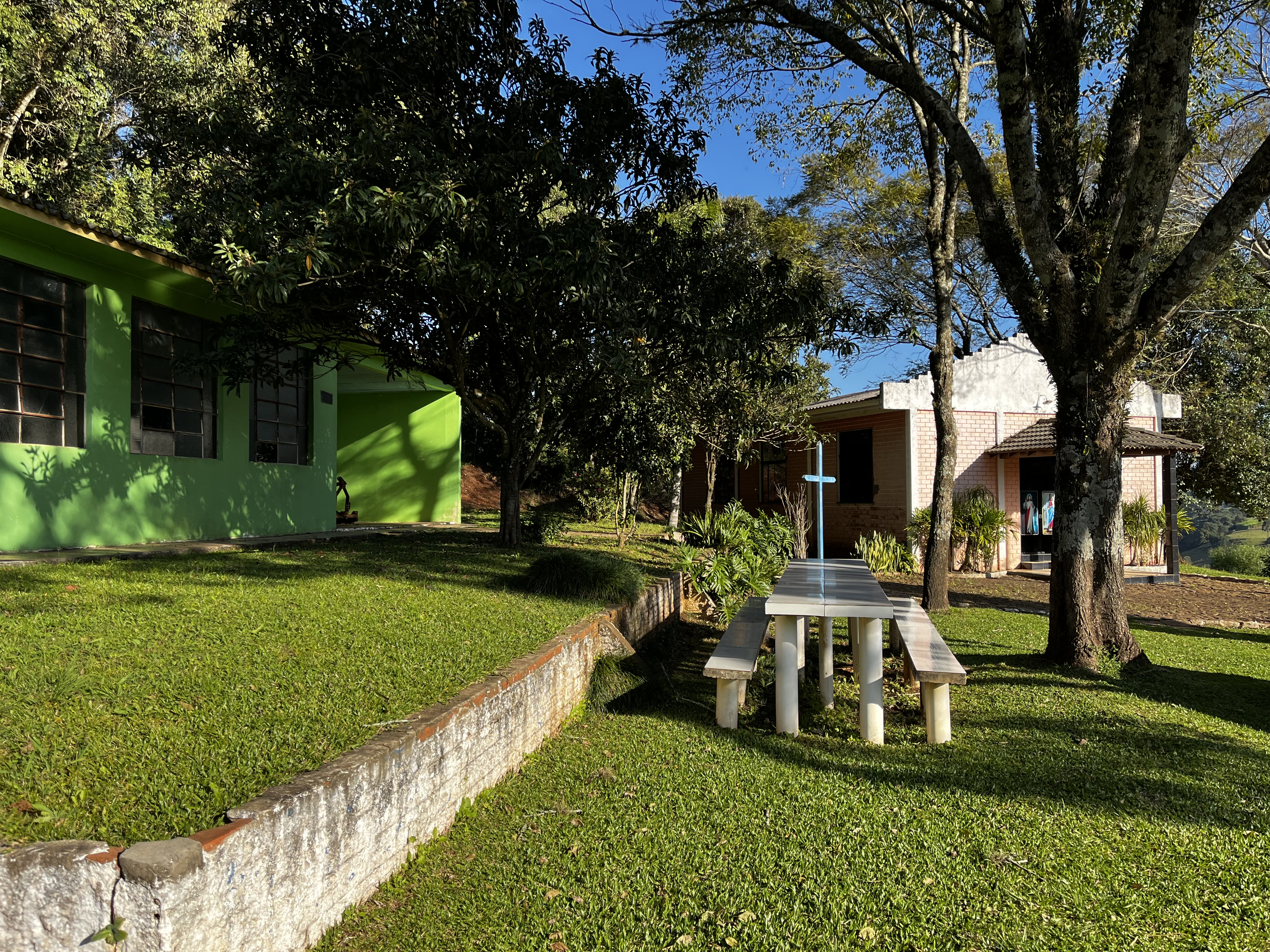
Church in the rural community of Linha Boa Esperança.

== Politics and administration ==
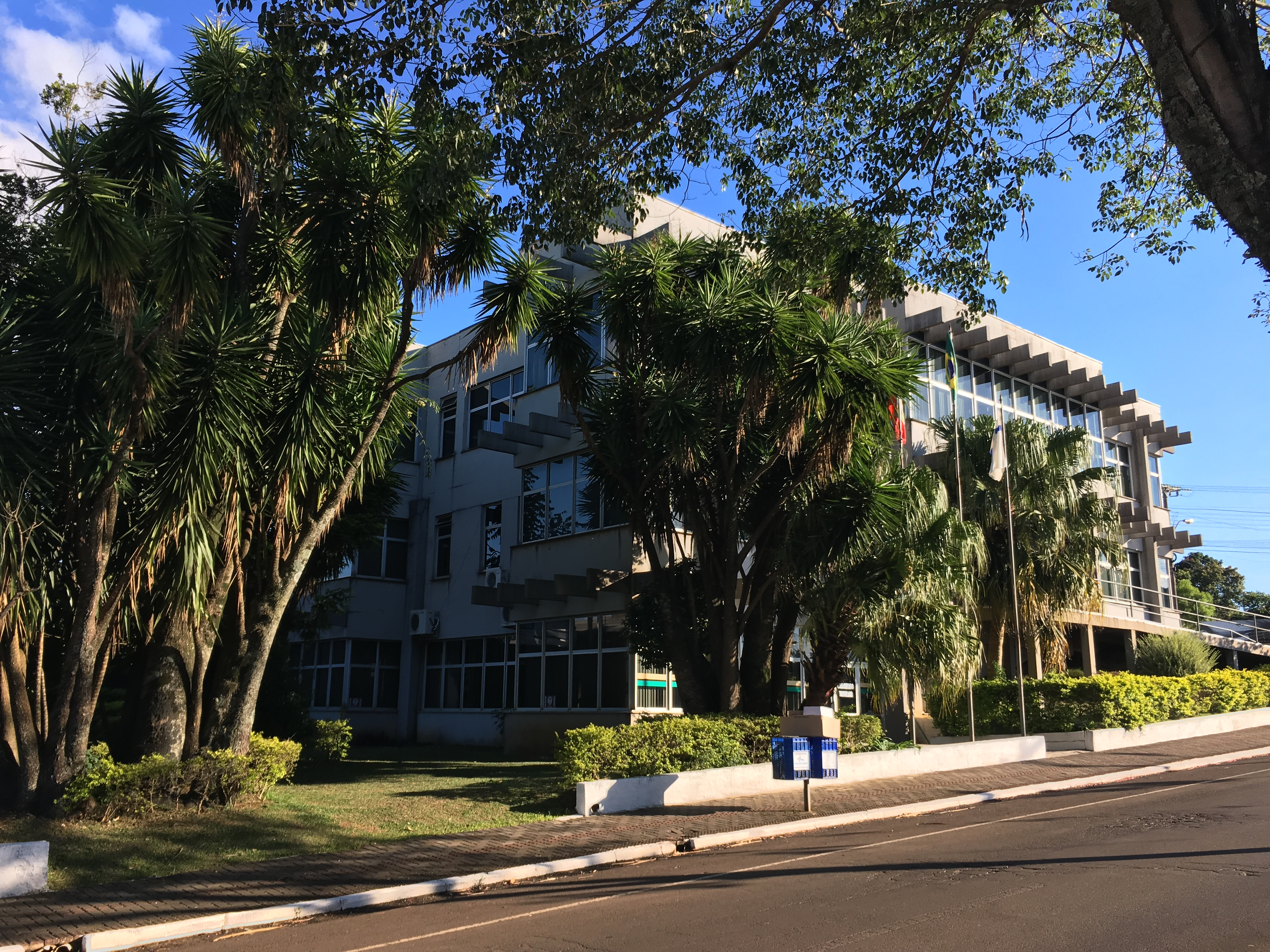
Faxinal dos Guedes City Hall.

Municipal government (2026)
Office	Officeholder
Mayor	Jader Adriel Danielli (PSD)
Deputy mayor	Ronaldo Fernando Daga (PL)
President of the Municipal Chamber	Valdecir Pinheiro (PSD)
Councillors	9

Municipal government is exercised by the executive and legislative branches. The executive is headed by Mayor Jader Adriel Danielli of the PSD, elected in 2024 for the 2025–2028 term, with Ronaldo Fernando Daga of the PL as deputy mayor.

The Municipal Chamber has nine councillors. In the 2024 election, the PSD won four seats, the Brazilian Democratic Movement (MDB) three, and the PL two. In 2026, the chamber was presided over by councillor Valdecir Pinheiro.

Before Danielli, Gilberto Ângelo Lazzari, known as Beti, served as mayor for two consecutive terms from 2017 to 2024.

== Economy ==
Economic indicators
Indicator	Value
GDP (2023)	R$845.4 million
GDP per capita (2023)	R$75,534.94
Share of GVA (2021)
Services	31.9%
Agriculture	29.9%
Industry	28.0%
Public administration	10.2%
Source: IBGE.

In 2023, the gross domestic product (GDP) of Faxinal dos Guedes was approximately R$845.4 million, with GDP per capita of R$75,534.94. The municipal economy is relatively diversified. In the latest sectoral breakdown available from the IBGE (2021), services accounted for 31.9% of gross value added (GVA), agriculture for 29.9%, industry for 28.0%, and public administration for 10.2%.

At current prices in 2021, services excluding public administration contributed approximately R$206.1 million in gross value added, followed by agriculture with R$193.0 million and industry with R$181.0 million. This distribution reflects the combination of farming, manufacturing and services linked to the urban population and regional production chains.

=== Industry and services ===
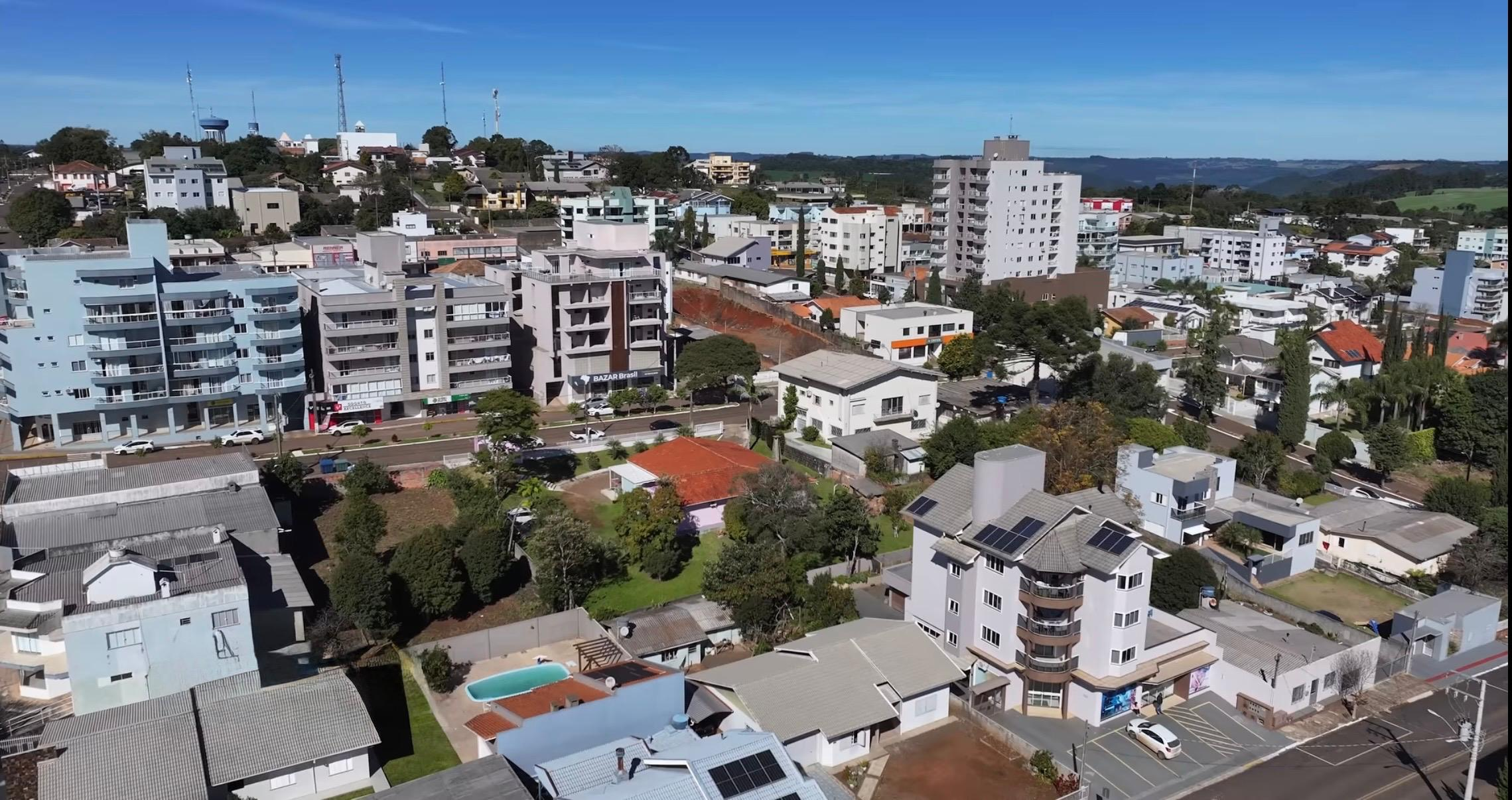
Central Faxinal dos Guedes in 2025.

Industrial activity initially developed around timber processing, which predominated during the municipality's early development. From the 1960s and 1970s onward, agribusiness and paper and packaging manufacturing expanded.

Paper and packaging production is among the municipality's established industrial activities. Bragagnolo Papel e Embalagens maintains its headquarters and industrial complex in Faxinal dos Guedes, in the district of Barra Grande, producing paper, paperboard and corrugated cardboard packaging.

Agribusiness also has a long-standing presence. In 1978, Sadia established Agropastoril Catarinense in Faxinal dos Guedes for research and development of breeding stock and for incubation, as part of the company's technological expansion in western Santa Catarina. The unit later became part of BRF and, following the BRF–Marfrig merger completed in 2025, became part of MBRF. The company maintains poultry-farming and hatchery operations in the municipality.

Services accounted for the largest individual share of municipal value added in 2021. Commerce and services are concentrated primarily in the municipal seat and serve both the local population and the municipality's agricultural and industrial activities.

=== Agriculture and livestock ===
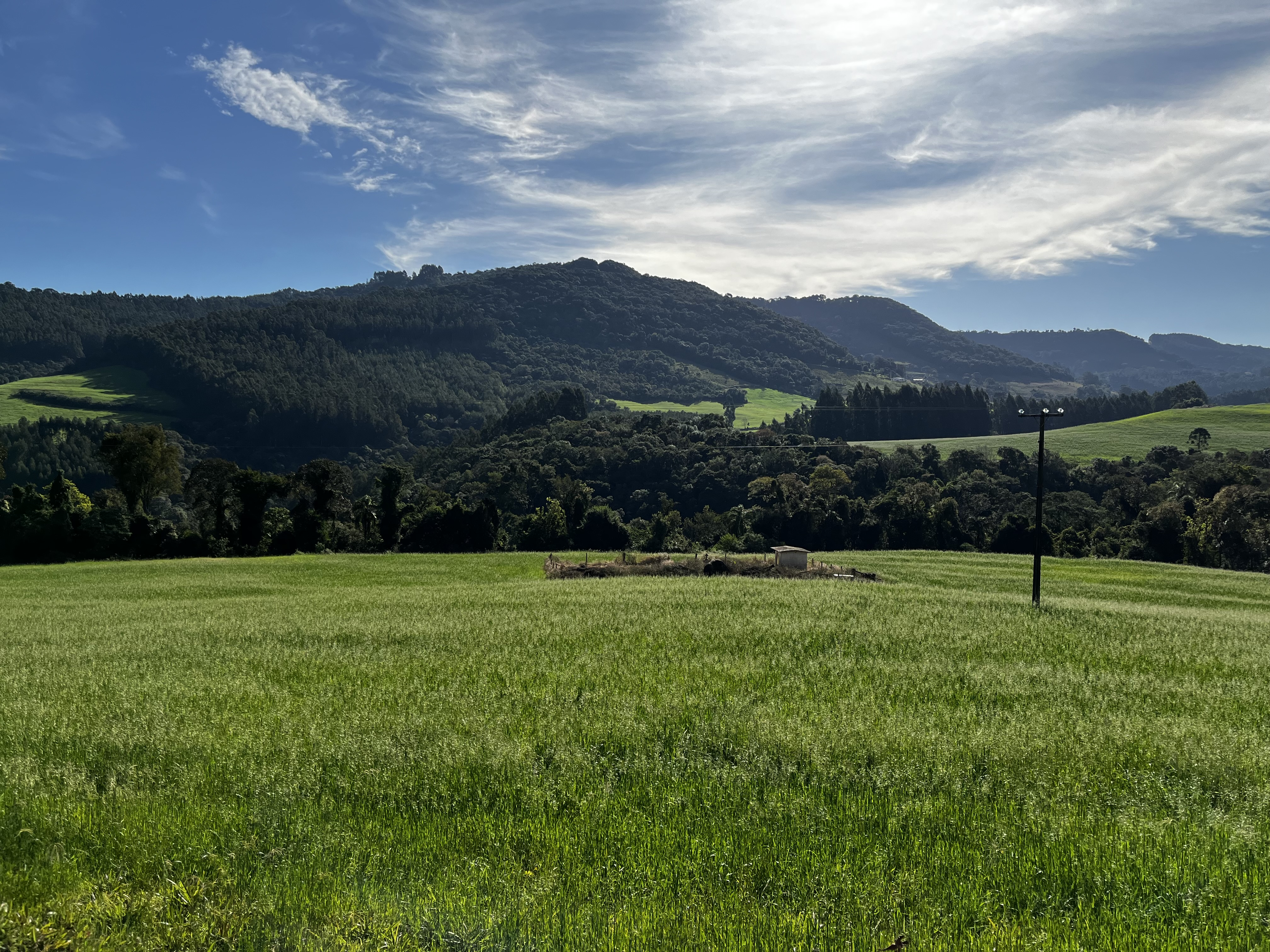
Agricultural field in the rural locality of Linha Foz das Tábuas.

Agriculture and livestock account for a substantial share of the economy of Faxinal dos Guedes. Crop production is dominated by annual grain crops. In 2024, soybean was the leading crop by production value, planted on 12,100 hectares and producing 49,140 tonnes. In the same year, the municipality produced 15,240 tonnes of maize, 7,200 tonnes of wheat, 3,600 tonnes of oats and 1,770 tonnes of beans.

Animal husbandry is dominated by poultry and pig farming. In 2024, the municipality had approximately 1.13 million chickens, 111,000 pigs and about 11,992 cattle. Dairy farming is also economically important: municipal milk production reached approximately 20.2 million litres in 2024, with a production value of about R$43.4 million.

== Infrastructure ==
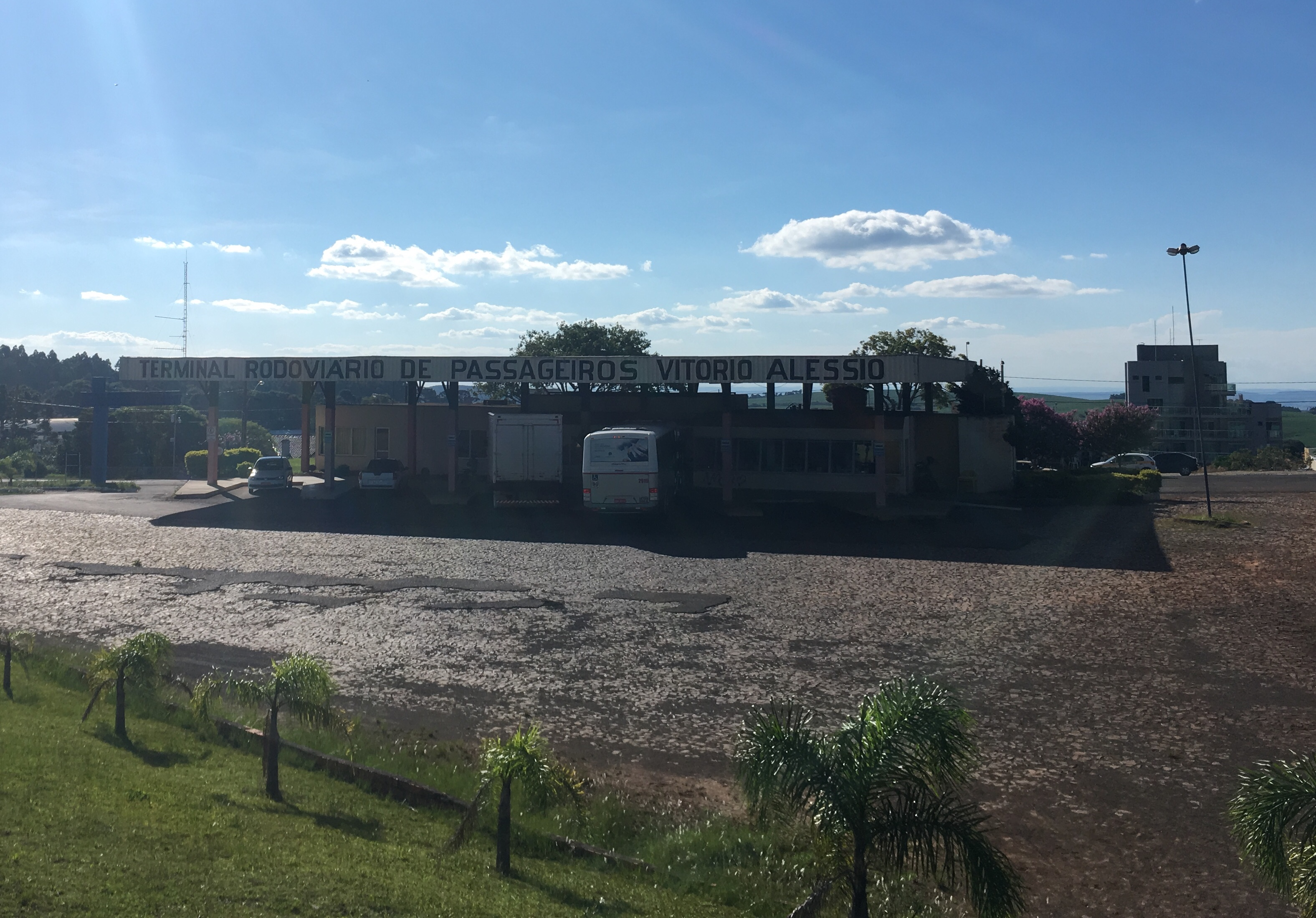
Vitório Aléssio Bus Terminal.

BR-282 is the municipality's main highway corridor, crossing Faxinal dos Guedes from east to west and connecting it to Xanxerê and Chapecó to the west and Vargeão and Ponte Serrada to the east. SC-154 links BR-282 with Ipumirim, while SC-350 crosses the northern part of the municipality on the route between Abelardo Luz and Passos Maia.

The municipal seat is connected to Barra Grande district by FAG-050, a paved municipal road. Intercity passenger services operate from the Vitório Aléssio Bus Terminal in the urban area.

Construction of the municipal sewerage system began in 1989 and was completed in 2004, when it came to serve the entire urban area. The public water supply is operated by the Santa Catarina Water and Sanitation Company (Casan).

=== Media ===
Faxinal dos Guedes has two FM radio stations. The commercial station Rádio Alternativa FM broadcasts on 102.7 MHz, while the community station Rádio Cidade FM operates on 104.9 MHz.

Digital terrestrial television services available in the municipality include SCC SBT on virtual channel 3.1, NDTV Chapecó on 6.1 and NSC TV Chapecó on 8.1, affiliated respectively with SBT, Record and TV Globo.

== Education ==
Santa Terezinha Municipal School.

Public education in Faxinal dos Guedes comprises municipal and state institutions providing early-childhood, primary, lower-secondary and upper-secondary education. The municipal school system operates Alexandre Antoniolli, Airo Ozelame, Santa Terezinha, Tereza Migliorini and Nossa Senhora Aparecida schools, the latter in Barra Grande district, as well as municipal early-childhood education centers.

Four municipal schools provide all nine years of ensino fundamental (primary and lower-secondary education). Ensino médio (upper-secondary education) is provided by the state schools Professor Salustiano Antônio Cabreira and Professor Tertuliano Turíbio de Lemos.

Enrollment in the municipal school system follows school zoning that covers both urban neighborhoods and rural communities. School transport also serves students from rural localities including Nova Sarandi, Esperinha, Santa Laura, São José das Tábuas and São Roque.

== Health ==
Faxinal dos Guedes is served by Hospital São Cristóvão, maintained by the Associação Hospitalar Beneficente São Cristóvão. In 2026, the hospital had 37 beds, 35 of them allocated to the Unified Health System (SUS), allocated to general medicine, general surgery, obstetrics and chronic care.

Primary care is provided by health units in Centro and the neighborhoods of São Cristóvão, João José Gehlen and Rosa, as well as in Barra Grande district.

== Culture, sports and leisure ==
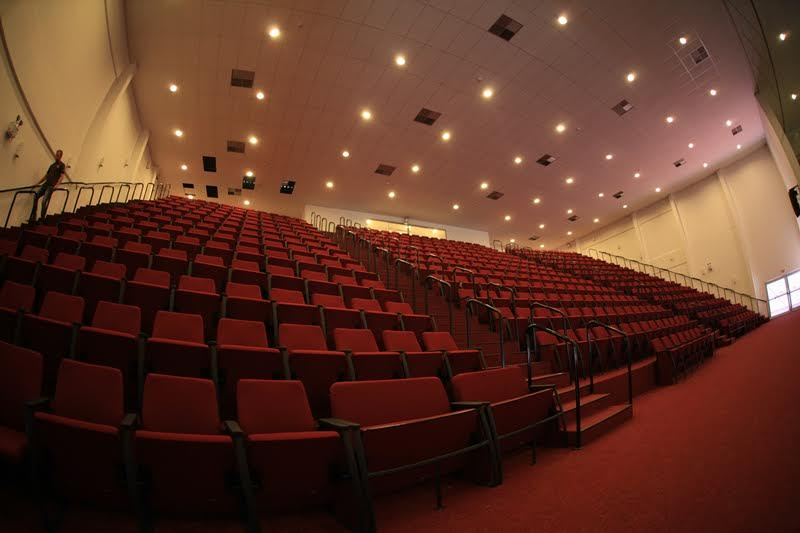
César Avelino Bragagnolo Culture and Events Center.

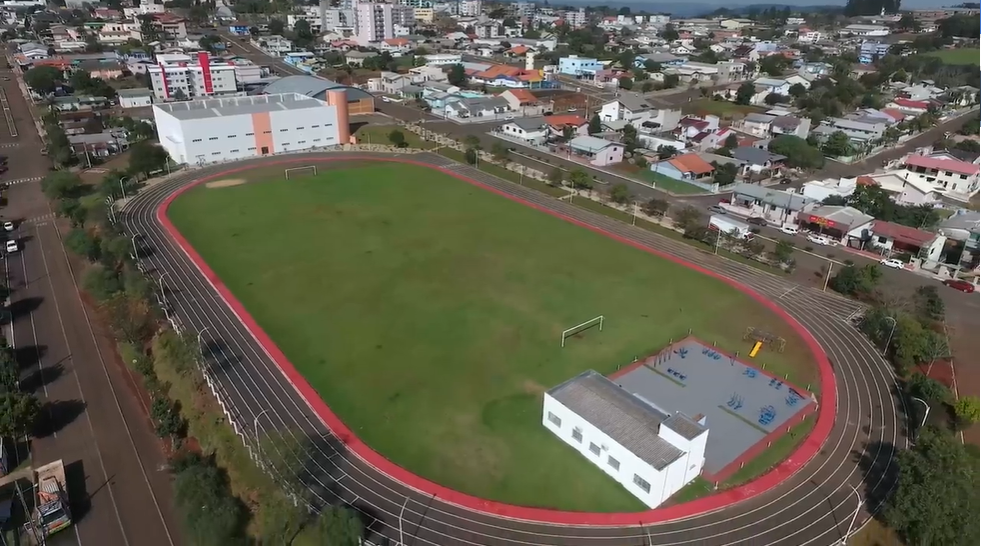
Sports complex in the São Cristóvão neighborhood.

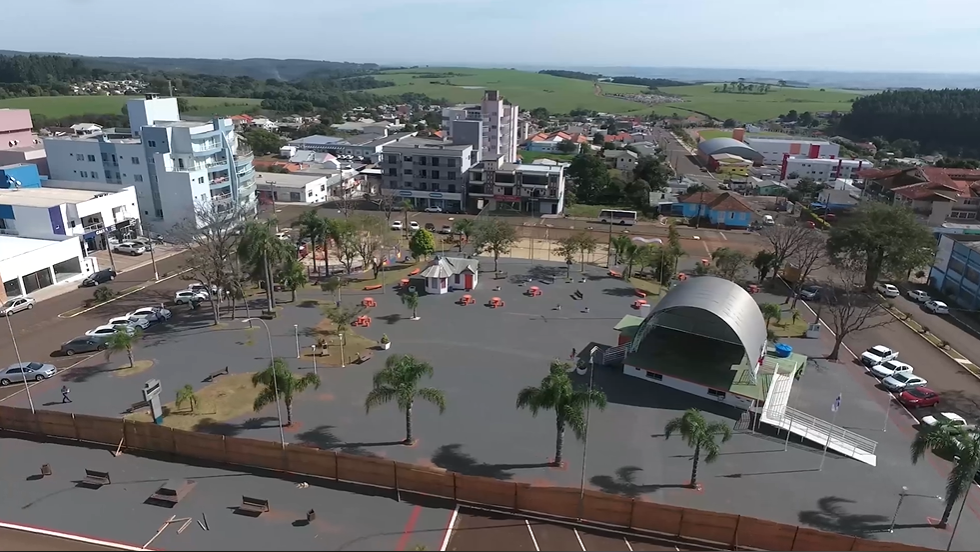
Ventura Migliorini Square.

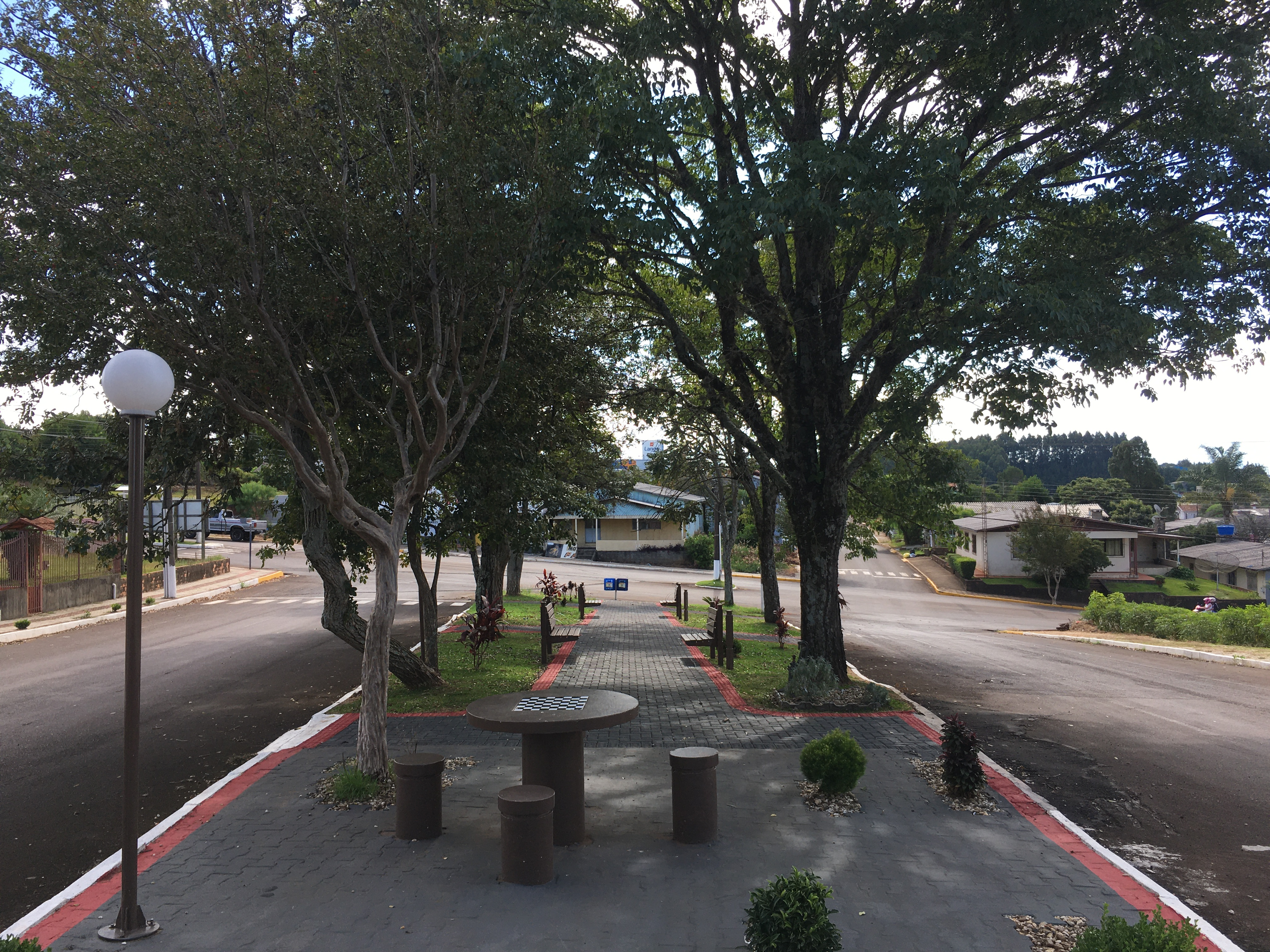
Praça dos Ipês.

The municipality's principal cultural facility is the César Avelino Bragagnolo Culture and Events Center, inaugurated in 2016. The complex houses the Municipal Library and a theater seating 530 spectators. Barra Grande district also has a municipal events center.

The main sports facilities include Centro Esportivo Faxinalense and the São Cristóvão sports complex, which contains the municipal football field, a track for athletics and walking, and an Academia da Saúde public fitness facility.

The principal natural recreation areas include Despraiado on the banks of the Chapecozinho River and a waterfall on the Cerca Velha River in the rural community of Boa Esperança, where the Gruta Nossa Senhora da Salete (Our Lady of La Salette Grotto) is located.

== Notable people ==
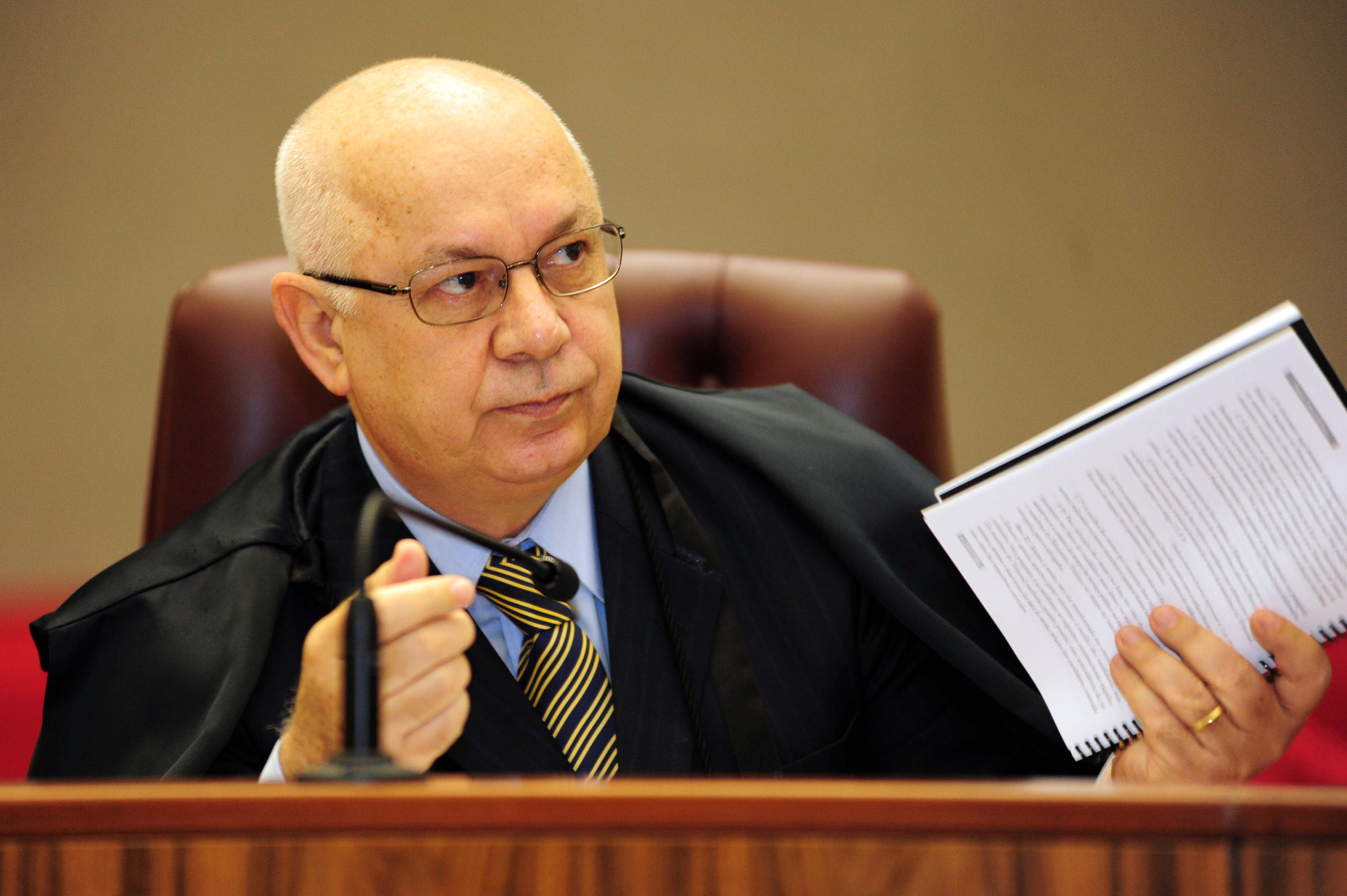
Teori Zavascki, justice of the Supreme Federal Court from 2012 to 2017.

Notable people associated with Faxinal dos Guedes include:

- Teori Zavascki (1948–2017), jurist, professor and judge, born in the municipality; justice of the Superior Court of Justice from 2003 to 2012 and of the Supreme Federal Court from 2012 to 2017.
- Ivete Azzolini, journalist and media executive, corporate director of Product, Content and Convergence at Grupo RIC.
- Plínio David de Nês Filho, businessman born in the municipality, who chaired Organizações Chapecó and worked in the management of the agribusiness group from the 1960s onward.
- Eron Giordani, businessman and politician born in the municipality, who served as Chief of Staff of the Government of Santa Catarina and was a candidate for vice governor in the 2022 state election.
- Lucas Itamir de Sá, professional footballer born in the municipality, who has played for clubs including Avaí, Tombense, Joinville, Remo and Londrina.

== See also ==
- List of municipalities in Santa Catarina
- List of Intermediate and Immediate Geographic Regions
- Vargeão Dome
- Municipalities of Brazil
