= Vargeão Dome =

Impact structure in Santa Catarina, Brazil

- Vargeão crater
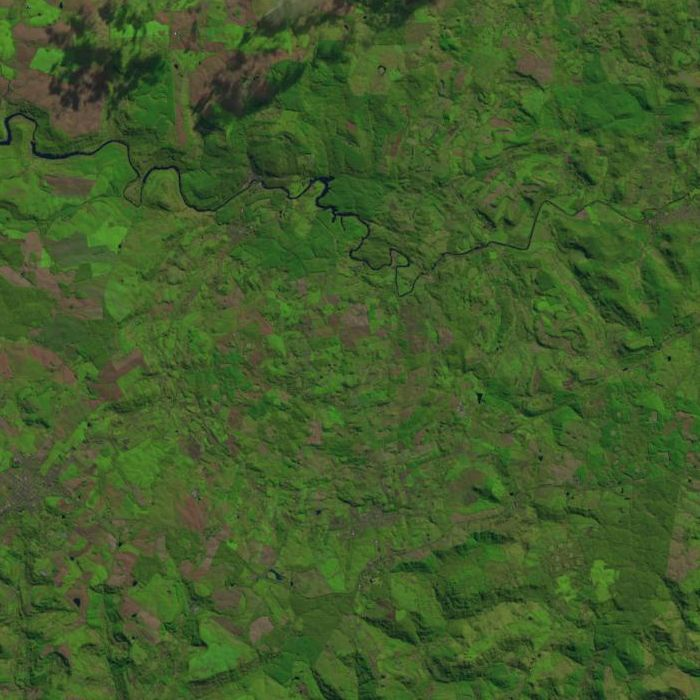
- Landsat image of the Vargeão impact structure

- Location within Brazil
- Location: Paraná Basin, Vargeão, Faxinal dos Guedes, Passos Maia, Santa Catarina, Brazil; 26°49′0″S 52°10′0″W

Impact crater structure
- Confidence: Confirmed
- Diameter: 12.4 km (7.7 mi)
- Age: ≤ 134 Ma; 123.0 ± 1.4 Ma proposed
- Exposed: Yes
- Drilled: Yes
- Access: BR-282

The Vargeão Dome, also known as the Vargeão crater, is a complex, partially eroded impact structure in western Santa Catarina, southern Brazil. It is about 12.4 km (7.7 mi) in diameter and extends across parts of the municipalities of Vargeão, Faxinal dos Guedes, and Passos Maia. The town of Vargeão lies inside the crater, close to its southern rim.

Access to the structure is mainly via BR-282, which crosses western Santa Catarina; Chapecó, the main regional urban centre and the location of the nearest airport, Chapecó Airport, lies about 71 km (44 mi) from Vargeão.

The structure formed mainly in volcanic rocks of the Serra Geral Formation, which overlie sandstones of the Botucatu Formation and Pirambóia Formation in the Paraná Basin. The impact uplifted these sedimentary units in the centre of the crater and produced features of shock metamorphism, including shatter cones, shocked quartz, and impact breccias. These features confirm its impact origin.

The age of the impact has not been securely established. U–Pb dating yielded an age of 123.0 ± 1.4 million years, which has been proposed as the age of the crater, but later studies regard only the maximum age imposed by the volcanic target rocks—approximately 134 million years—as secure.

== Geology ==
In the Vargeão area, the Serra Geral Formation consists of a volcanic sequence about one kilometre thick, composed mainly of basalts. Beneath it lie sandstones of the Pirambóia and Botucatu formations. The Botucatu Formation sandstones were deposited by wind-blown dunes in an extensive desert environment before being covered by the Serra Geral lava flows.

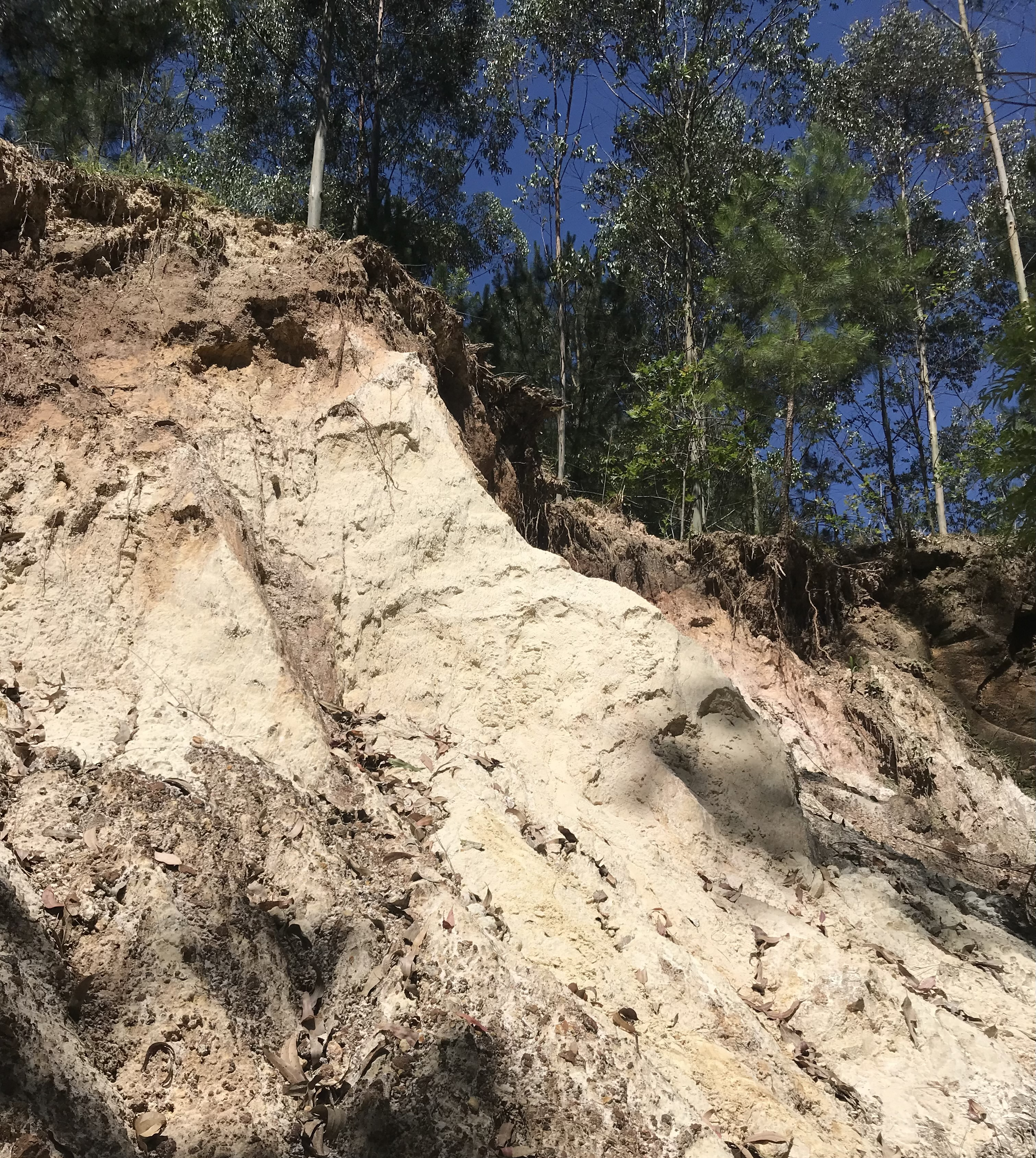
Botucatu Formation sandstone in the central part of the crater. Deposited in a desert environment and later covered by Serra Geral lava flows, it was uplifted by the impact.

The crater is approximately circular, with a well-defined rim and concentric and radial fractures in its interior. It is classified as a complex impact structure, characterised by uplift of the central region during crater formation. At Vargeão, this process brought sandstone blocks to the surface that would normally remain buried beneath the volcanic sequence.

Geophysical modelling indicates a central uplift about 4 km (2.5 mi) wide and a vertical displacement of the sandstones of about 500 m (1,600 ft). The original structure may have been about 14 km (8.7 mi) in diameter before erosion removed approximately 300 to 500 m (980 to 1,640 ft) of rock.

Evidence of shock metamorphism includes shatter cones in sandstone and basalt, planar deformation features in quartz and plagioclase, diaplectic glass in feldspars, and several types of impact breccia. Geophysical surveys have also identified a magnetic anomaly in the core of the structure, associated with intensely deformed rocks and pseudotachylytic breccias.

== Formation and age ==
Numerical simulations indicate that the structure may have been produced by an impactor about 1.4 km (0.87 mi) in diameter, striking the region at approximately 12 km/s (7.5 mi/s). The model reproduces a crater formed in a thick basaltic sequence over sandstone and is consistent with the uplift observed in the centre of Vargeão.

Researchers used U–Pb dating on zircon crystals in veins interpreted as being related to the impact and obtained an age of 123.0 ± 1.4 million years. This age was proposed for the event but remains debated. The secure chronological constraint is that the impact postdates the Serra Geral volcanic rocks affected by the crater, which are approximately 134 million years old.

== Research history ==
The circular structure was recognised in 1978 on radar images produced by the RADAMBRASIL survey. Early studies described the anomalous occurrence of older sedimentary units within the volcanic sequence and named the feature the Vargeão Dome.

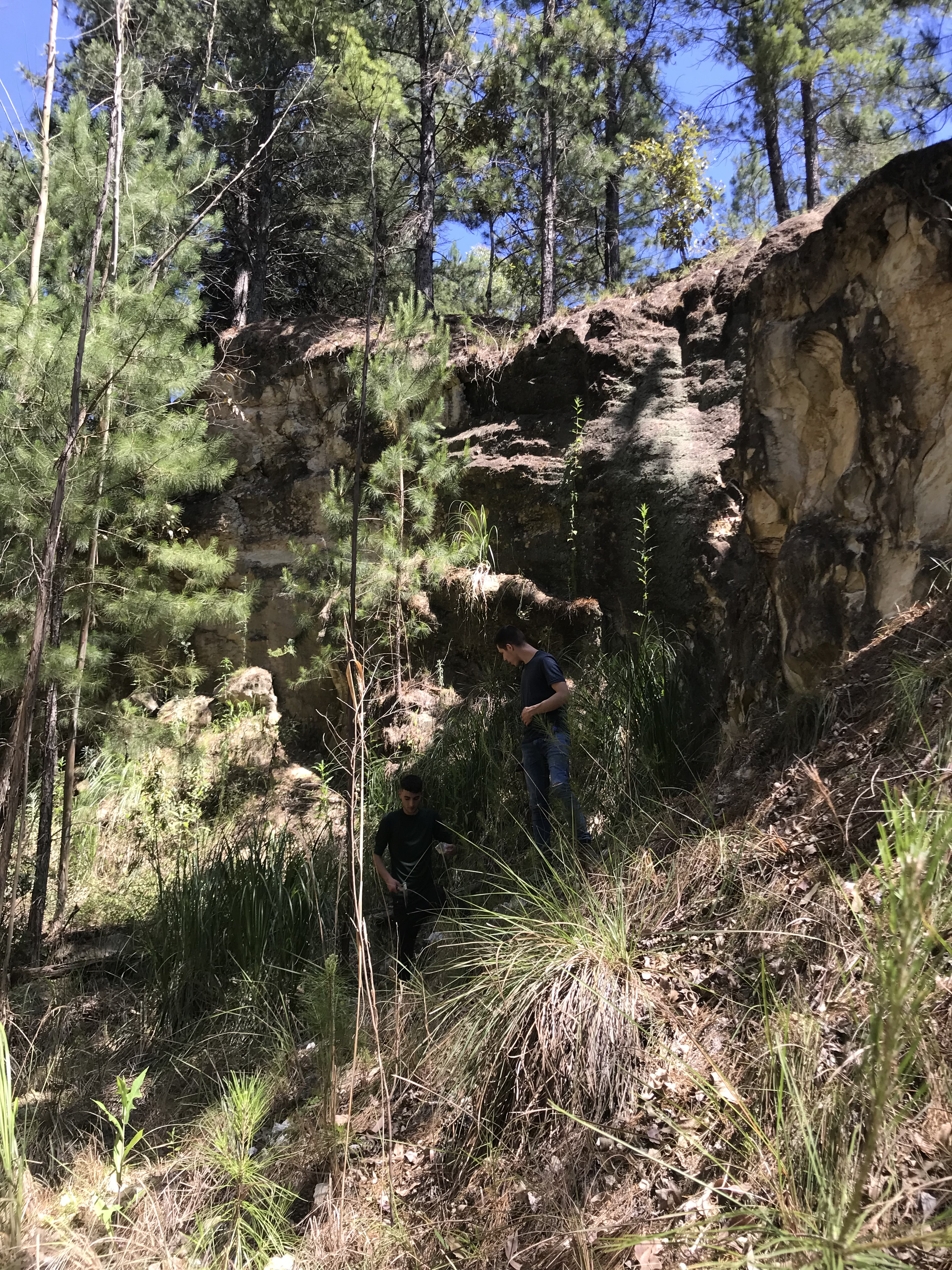
Geographers and postgraduate Geography students from the Federal University of Fronteira Sul during fieldwork at Vargeão Dome in 2022.

In the early 1980s, surveys associated with oil and gas exploration considered volcanic and tectonic hypotheses for its origin. An impact origin was proposed in 1982 and was subsequently confirmed by the identification of shock-metamorphic features.

Since the 2000s, geophysical, petrographic, geochronological and numerical-modelling studies have refined understanding of the crater's geometry, internal structure and impact-related processes.

== Research and geoconservation ==
Vargeão is one of the few known impact structures on Earth formed predominantly in basaltic rocks. It is therefore used in studies of impact cratering in volcanic terrains, which are common on other bodies in the Solar System.

Recent research has also examined hydrothermal alteration associated with the structure. Analyses published in 2026 identified two main stages of vein formation and indicated that the impact reactivated a pre-existing hydrothermal system. Vargeão is therefore studied as a terrestrial analogue for hydrothermal systems associated with impact craters on Mars.

The Vargeão Dome is included in the geodiversity-site inventory of the Geological Survey of Brazil. The inventory assesses the site as being at high risk of degradation and identifies agricultural land use and the extraction of sandstone for construction sand among the principal pressures on the site.

== See also ==
- Araguainha crater
- Vista Alegre crater
- Cerro do Jarau crater
- List of impact structures on Earth
