= Vista Alegre crater =

Meteorite crater in Paraná, Brazil

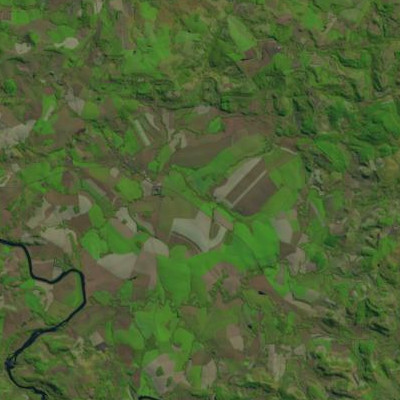
- Landsat image of Vista Alegre crater

- Location within Paraná Location within Brazil
- Location: Paraná Basin, Coronel Vivida, Paraná, Brazil; 25°57′S 52°41′W

Impact crater structure
- Confidence: Confirmed
- Diameter: 9.5 km (5.9 mi)
- Age: <65 Ma, or ~115 Ma; Paleogene or younger, or Aptian
- Exposed: Yes
- Drilled: No

The Vista Alegre crater is a meteorite crater in Coronel Vivida, Paraná State, Brazil. On the surface it appears as a circular, relatively flat plain within otherwise hilly terrain.

== Description ==
It is 9.5 kilometres (5.9 mi) in diameter and the age is estimated to be less than 65 million years (Paleocene or younger). More recently, a date of about 115 Ma has been given and closer to the age of Vargeão Dome. Considering the proximity of location, age, and stratigraphic similarities of Vista Alegre and Vargeão, it has been proposed that it was a double impact.

== See also ==
- Vargeão Dome
