= Ouro Verde =

Ouro Verde may refer to:

- Ouro Verde, Santa Catarina, Brazil
- Ouro Verde, São Paulo, Brazil
- Ouro Verde (TV series), a Portuguese telenovela
