= Araucárias National Park =

National park in Santa Catarina, Brazil

Coordinates: 26°45′53″S 51°58′03″W

- Parque Nacional das Araucárias
- IUCN category II (national park)
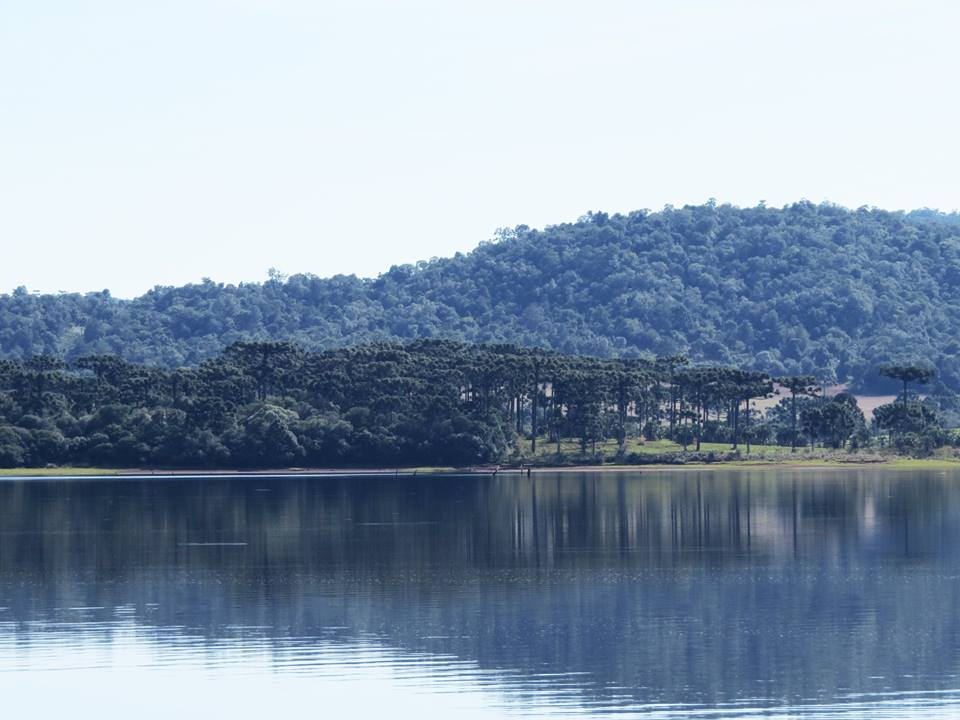
- View of the park

- Location within Brazil
- Area: 12,841 hectares (31,730 acres)
- Designation: national park
- Created: 19 October 2005

Araucárias National Park (Portuguese: Parque Nacional das Araucárias) is a national park in the state of Santa Catarina, Brazil.

== Location ==
The Araucárias National Park is located in the Santa Catarina municipalities of Passos Maia and Ponte Serrada. The protected area was established on 19 October 2005 and has an area of 12,841 hectares (31,730 acres). The park is administered by the Chico Mendes Institute for Biodiversity Conservation. Annual rainfall averages 1,930 millimetres (76 in). Average temperature is 17 °C (63 °F). The park is on the Campos Gerais, a plateau that slopes gently down to the west. The land ranges in altitude from 805 to 1,218 metres (2,641 to 3,996 ft).

The vegetation in the area directly influenced by the park is mainly native secondary formations in different stages of regeneration, exploited primary forest, reforestation with exotic species (Pinus and Eucalyptus), agricultural areas and pastures. The protected area is surrounded by a 500 metres (1,600 ft) buffer zone holding small farms and agrarian reform settlements as well as soy plantations and cattle ranches. In addition to the characteristic Araucaria angustifolia of the mixed rainforest there are other endangered species such as Dicksonia sellowiana and Ocotea porosa. The forest helps maintain water quality in the Chapecó, Chapecozinho, Mato and Caratuva rivers.

== Conservation ==
The park is classed as IUCN protected-area category II (national park). The basic objective is to preserve the natural environments, which hold remnants of the Araucária Forest and plants of the Atlantic Forest biome that are highly threatened by human activity. The park supports scientific research, environmental education, outdoor recreation and eco-tourism. The parks is threatened by wild boars, abandoned domestic animals, disturbed areas and the practice of hunting wild animals. Protected species include maned wolf (Chrysocyon brachyurus), helmeted woodpecker (Dryocopus galeatus), ocelot (Leopardus pardalis) and cougar (Puma concolor).

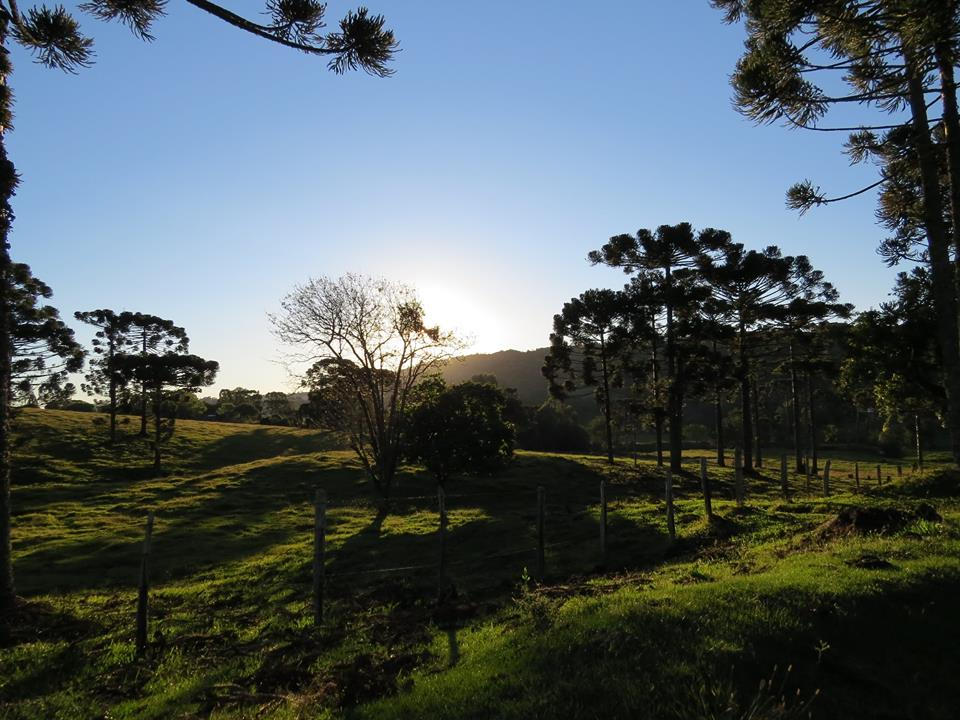

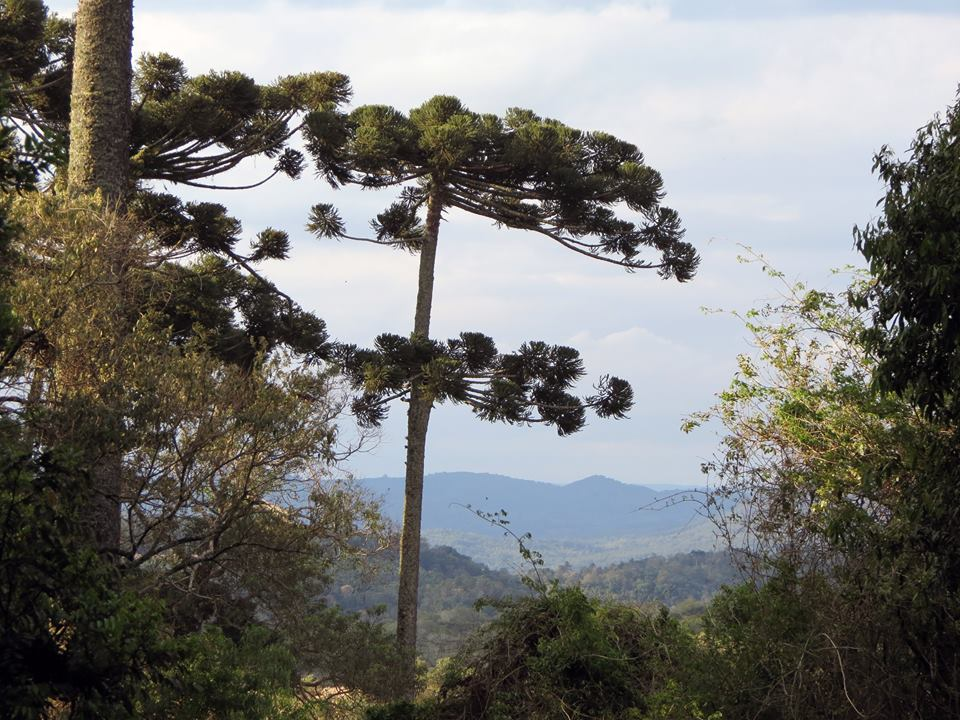
Araucária

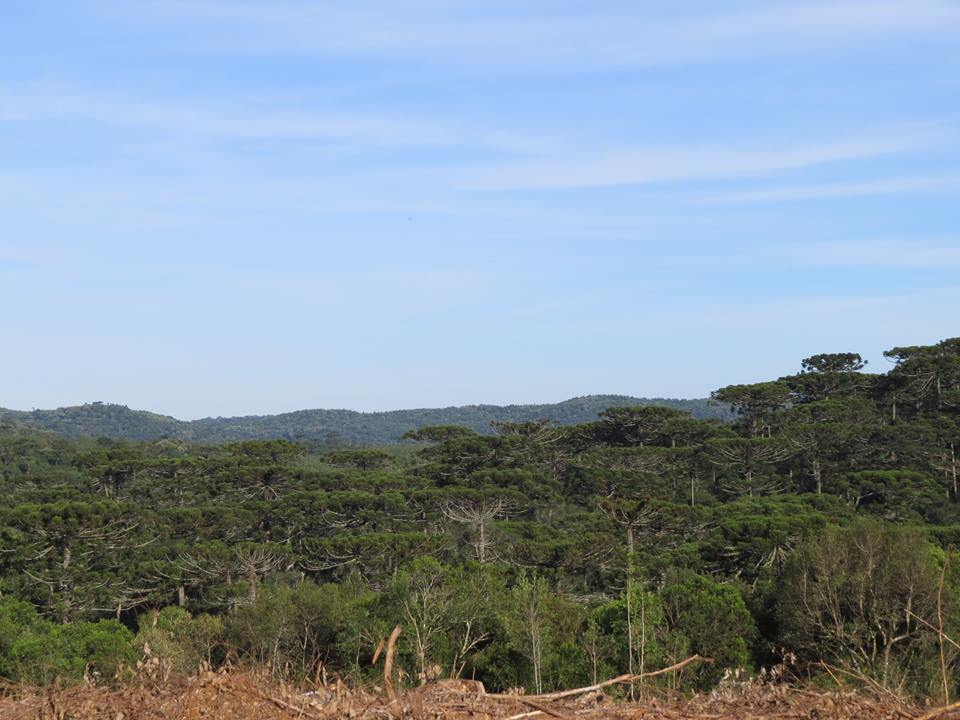
Stand of araucárias

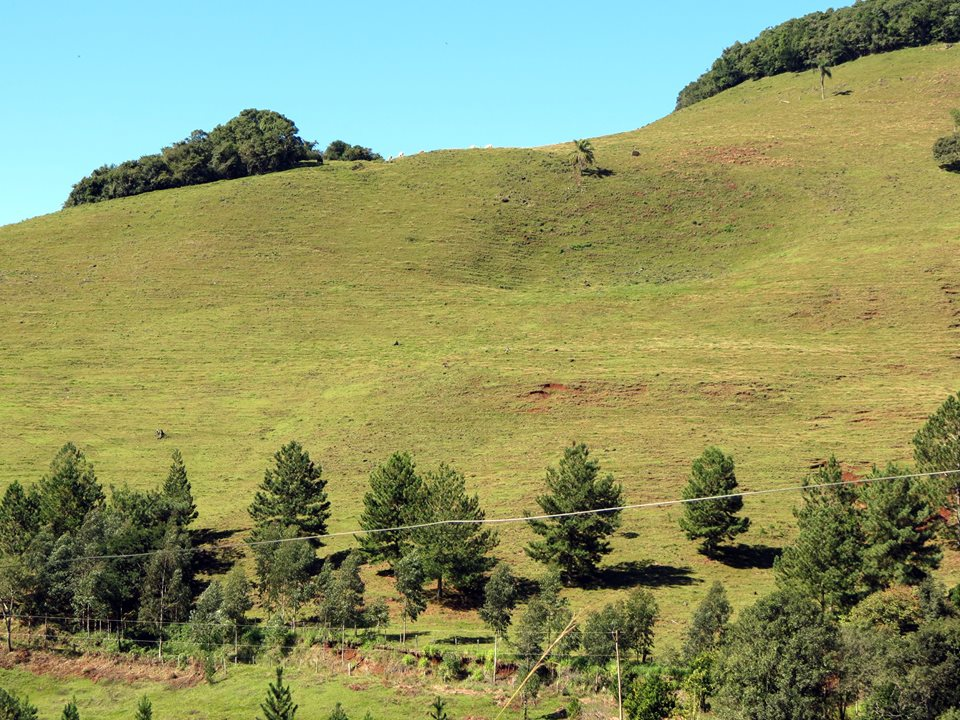
Deforested area

== Sources ==
- O Parque Nacional das Araucárias (in Portuguese), Apremavi: Associação de Preservação do Meio Ambiente e da Vida, archived from the original on 2016-03-07
- Parna das Araucárias (in Portuguese), Chico Mendes Institute for Biodiversity Conservation, archived from the original on 2016-03-03
- Unidade de Conservação: Parque Nacional das Araucárias (in Portuguese), MMA: Ministério do Meio Ambiente
