= Coronel Vivida =

Coordinates: 25°58′S 52°34′W

- Municipality
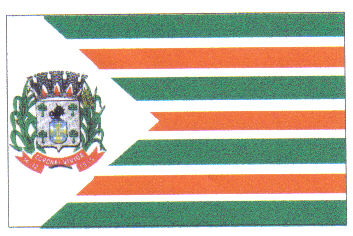
- Flag
- Interactive map of Coronel Vivida
- Country: Brazil
- Region: Southern
- State: Paraná
- Mesoregion: Sudoeste Paranaense

Population (2020)
  - Total: 20,580
- Time zone: UTC−3 (BRT)

Coronel Vivida is a municipality in the state of Paraná in the Southern Region of Brazil.

== See also ==
- List of municipalities in Paraná
