= Ponte Serrada =

Coordinates: 26°52′S 51°58′W

- Municipality
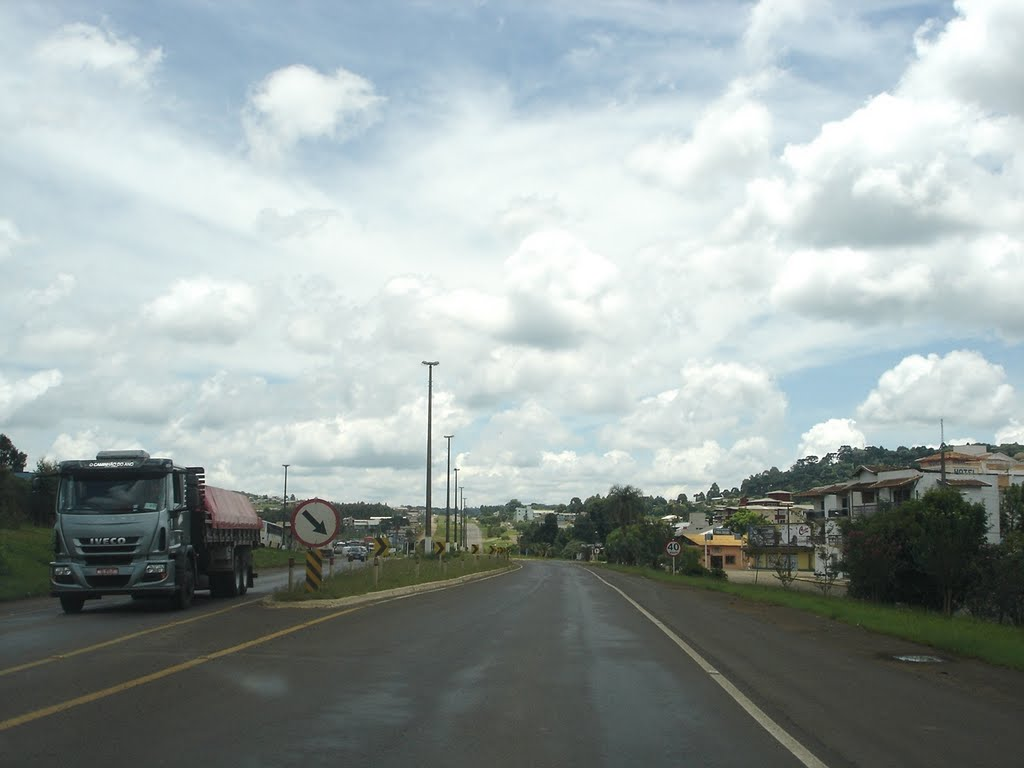

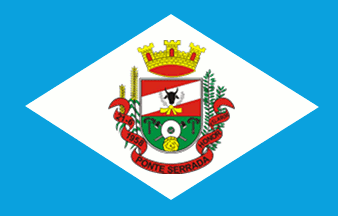
- Flag Coat of arms

- Country: Brazil
- Region: South
- State: Santa Catarina
- Mesoregion: Oeste Catarinense

Population (2020)
  - Total: 11,634
- Time zone: UTC -3

Ponte Serrada is a municipality in the state of Santa Catarina in the South region of Brazil.

The municipality contains part of the Araucárias National Park, a 12,841 hectares (31,730 acres) conservation unit created in 2005.

== Climate ==
Climate data for Ponte Serrada, elevation 1,100 m (3,600 ft), (1976–2005)
| Month | Jan | Feb | Mar | Apr | May | Jun | Jul | Aug | Sep | Oct | Nov | Dec | Year |
|---|---|---|---|---|---|---|---|---|---|---|---|---|---|
| Record high °C (°F) | 31.2 (88.2) | 30.8 (87.4) | 32.0 (89.6) | 30.0 (86.0) | 27.2 (81.0) | 24.8 (76.6) | 27.8 (82.0) | 30.2 (86.4) | 31.3 (88.3) | 31.8 (89.2) | 32.4 (90.3) | 32.0 (89.6) | 32.4 (90.3) |
| Mean daily maximum °C (°F) | 26.3 (79.3) | 25.8 (78.4) | 25.5 (77.9) | 22.9 (73.2) | 19.5 (67.1) | 17.8 (64.0) | 17.5 (63.5) | 20.4 (68.7) | 20.7 (69.3) | 22.6 (72.7) | 25.0 (77.0) | 26.1 (79.0) | 22.5 (72.5) |
| Daily mean °C (°F) | 20.7 (69.3) | 20.0 (68.0) | 19.4 (66.9) | 16.9 (62.4) | 13.6 (56.5) | 12.5 (54.5) | 11.9 (53.4) | 14.1 (57.4) | 14.8 (58.6) | 16.8 (62.2) | 18.7 (65.7) | 20.2 (68.4) | 16.6 (61.9) |
| Mean daily minimum °C (°F) | 16.4 (61.5) | 16.2 (61.2) | 15.5 (59.9) | 13.2 (55.8) | 10.1 (50.2) | 9.1 (48.4) | 8.7 (47.7) | 10.0 (50.0) | 10.9 (51.6) | 12.7 (54.9) | 13.8 (56.8) | 15.7 (60.3) | 12.7 (54.9) |
| Record low °C (°F) | 8.8 (47.8) | 8.0 (46.4) | 4.0 (39.2) | 0.4 (32.7) | −2.2 (28.0) | −3.2 (26.2) | −5.0 (23.0) | −6.0 (21.2) | −2.2 (28.0) | 1.2 (34.2) | 2.6 (36.7) | 9.2 (48.6) | −6.0 (21.2) |
| Average precipitation mm (inches) | 225.5 (8.88) | 205.5 (8.09) | 132.9 (5.23) | 175.6 (6.91) | 219.3 (8.63) | 178.5 (7.03) | 190.9 (7.52) | 135.1 (5.32) | 195.2 (7.69) | 220.0 (8.66) | 173.8 (6.84) | 169.7 (6.68) | 2,222 (87.48) |
| Average relative humidity (%) | 80 | 83 | 80 | 81 | 81 | 80 | 76 | 70 | 75 | 76 | 72 | 75 | 77 |
| Mean monthly sunshine hours | 213 | 191 | 215 | 182 | 186 | 153 | 183 | 201 | 176 | 198 | 236 | 240 | 2,374 |
Source: Empresa Brasileira de Pesquisa Agropecuária (EMBRAPA)

== See also ==
- List of municipalities in Santa Catarina
