= Vargeão =

Coordinates: 26.8636°S 52.155°W

- Municipality
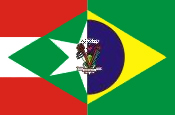
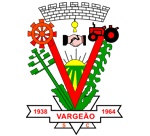
- Flag Coat of arms
- Nickname: Meteor City
- Country: Brazil
- Region: South
- State: Santa Catarina
- Mesoregion: Oeste Catarinense

Population (2022)
  - Total: 3,634
- Time zone: UTC -3

Vargeão is a municipality located in the state of Santa Catarina in the south region of Brazil. It is located in the Immediate Geographic Region of Xanxerê and the Intermediate Geographic Region of Chapecó and at 298 miles away from the capital of Santa Catarina, Florianópolis.

Its population, according to the demographic census of the Brazilian Institute of Geography and Statistics, carried out in 2022, is 3 634 inhabitants.

The town is located on the southern rim of an impact crater, the Vargeão Dome. Vargeão's city hall is located inside the crater. The local population is well aware of the impact origin of the structure, to the point that the town's official nickname is Meteor City (Terra do Meteorro).

Its inhabitants are predominantly of Italian descent. A large floodplain (in portuguese: várzea) in the area gave rise to the name Vargeão (very large floodplain, in portuguese).

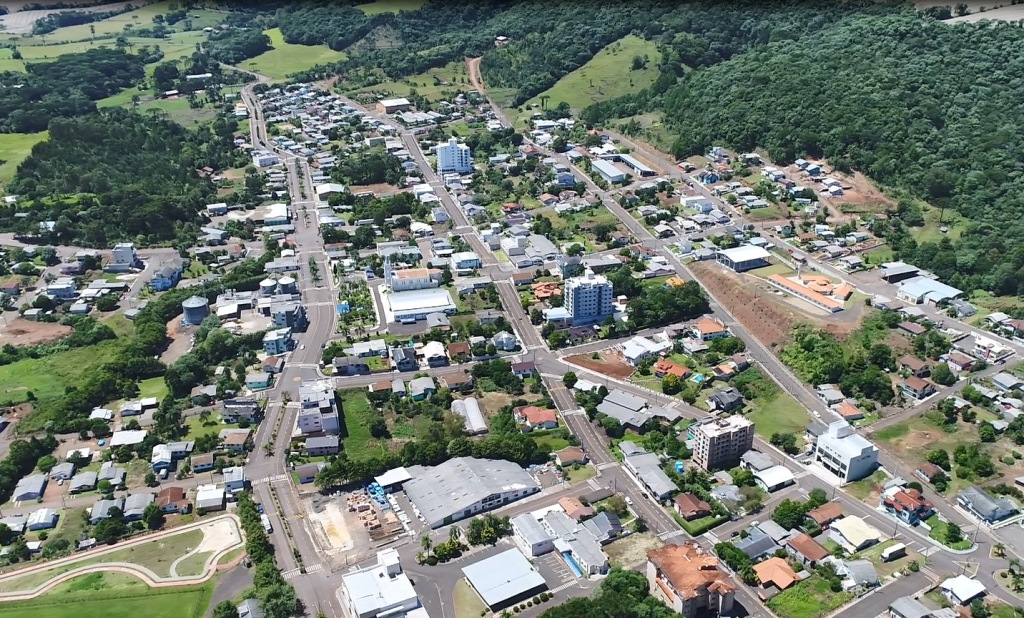
Aerial view of the city.

== See also ==
- List of municipalities in Santa Catarina
- Vargeão Dome
