= Ipuaçu =

Coordinates: 26.6314°S 52.455°W

- Municipality
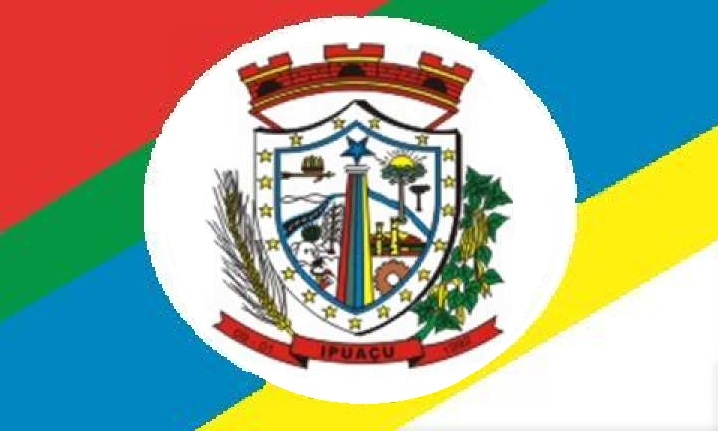
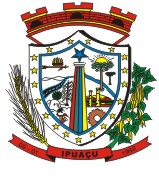
- Flag Coat of arms

- Country: Brazil
- Region: South
- State: Santa Catarina
- Mesoregion: Oeste Catarinense

Population (2020)
  - Total: 7,579
- Time zone: UTC -3

Ipuaçu is a municipality in the state of Santa Catarina in the South region of Brazil. Since 2008, the city is a regular setting of crop circles, which always appear on October or November and are often studied by Brazilian ufologists.

== See also ==
- List of municipalities in Santa Catarina
