= Paraíso, Santa Catarina =

Paraíso
- Municipality
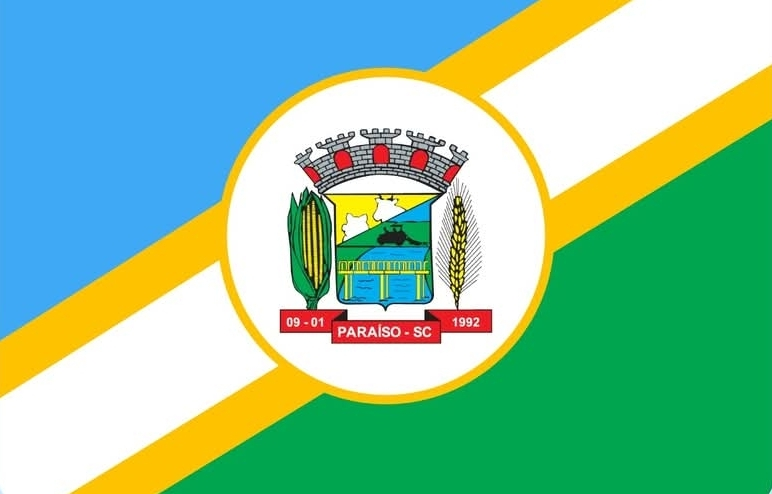
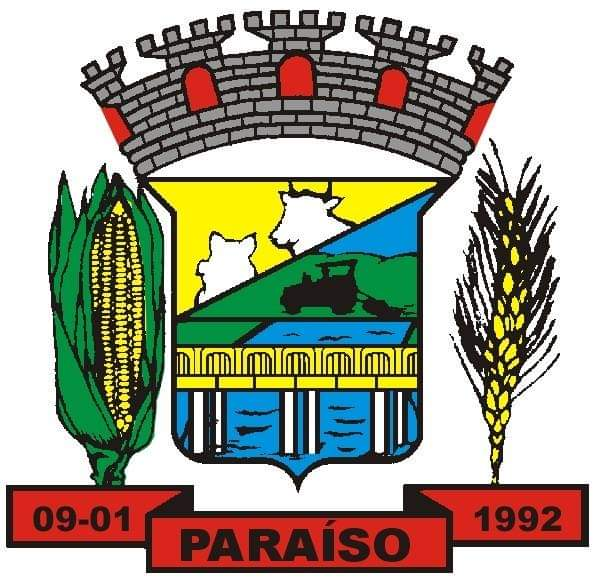
- Flag Coat of arms

- Location in Santa Catarina state

- Location in Brazil
- Coordinates: 26°36′50″S 53°40′19″W
- Country: Brazil
- Region: South
- State: Santa Catarina

Area
  - Total: 181 km^{2} (70 sq mi)

Population (2020)
  - Total: 3,360
  - Density: 18.6/km^{2} (48.1/sq mi)
- Time zone: UTC-03:00 (BRT)
  - Summer (DST): UTC-02:00 (BRST)

Paraíso is a municipality in the state of Santa Catarina in Brazil. The population is 3,360 (2020 est.) in an area of 181 km^{2}. The elevation is 520 m.
