= BR-282 (Brazil highway) =

Highway in Brazil

BR-282

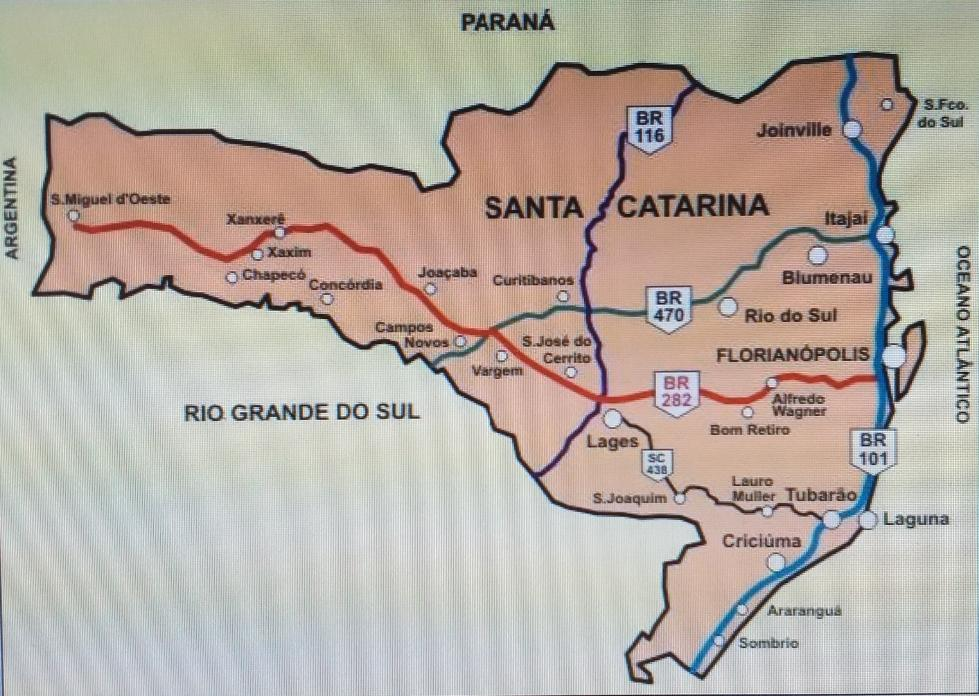

Route information
- Length: 680.6 km (422.9 mi)

Major junctions
- east end: Florianópolis, Santa Catarina
- west end: Paraíso, Santa Catarina

Location
- Country: Brazil

Highway system
- Highways in Brazil; Federal

BR-282 is a federal highway in the southern Brazilian state of Santa Catarina. The highway spans the entire length of the state from the state capital, Florianópolis on the Atlantic Ocean in the east, 680.6 km westward to the town of Paraíso on the border with Argentina.

== Economic importance ==
BR-282 is one of the main highways in the state of Santa Catarina, connecting the countryside to the coastal ports. The areas around Chapecó and Concórdia concentrate the largest production of pork in the country and are home to companies such as Sadia, Perdigão and Seara, which became the multinationals BRF and JBS. Although the highway reaches the border with Argentina, there is still no large movement of goods between the countries in the region.

== Gallery ==
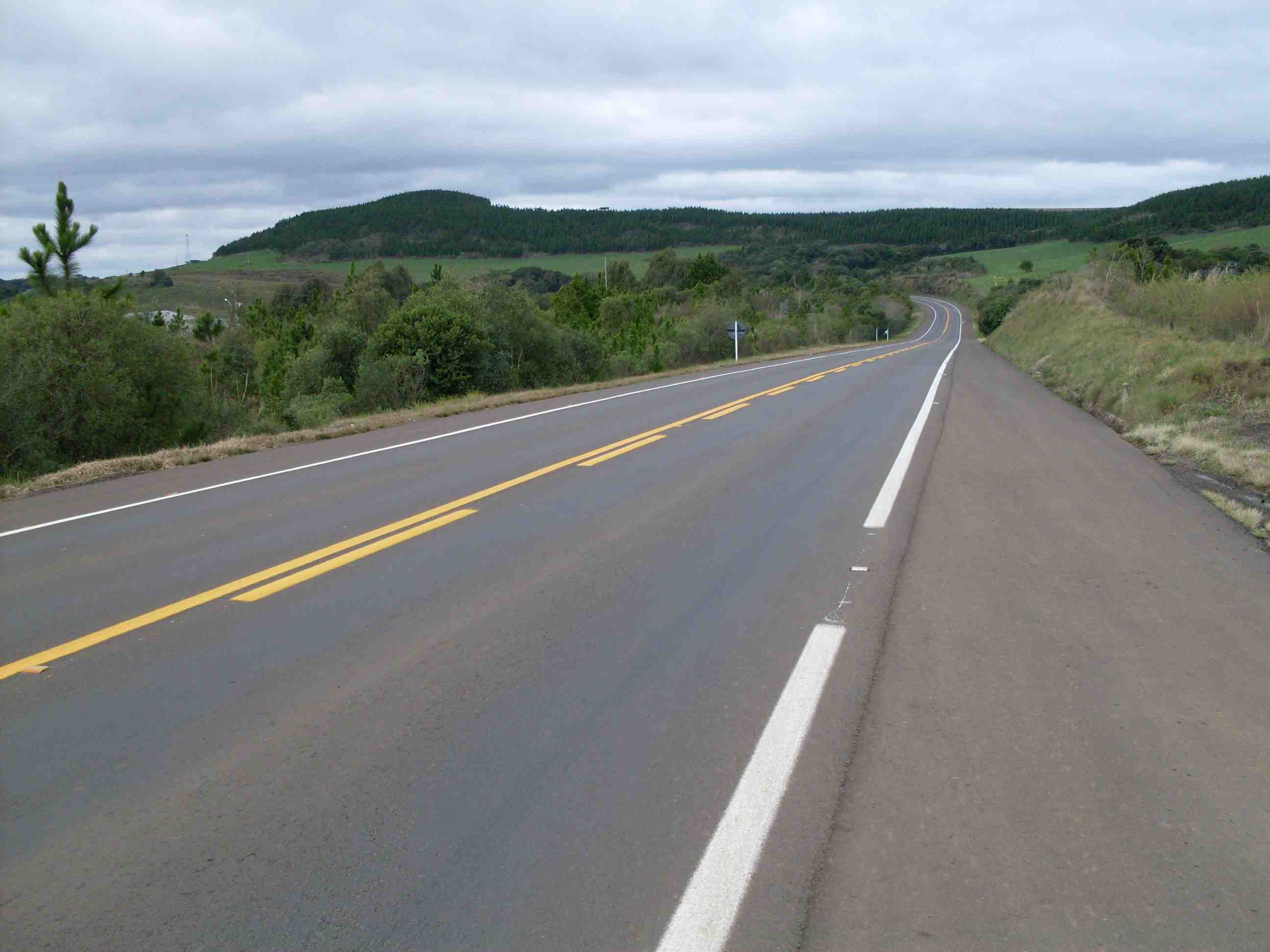
BR-282

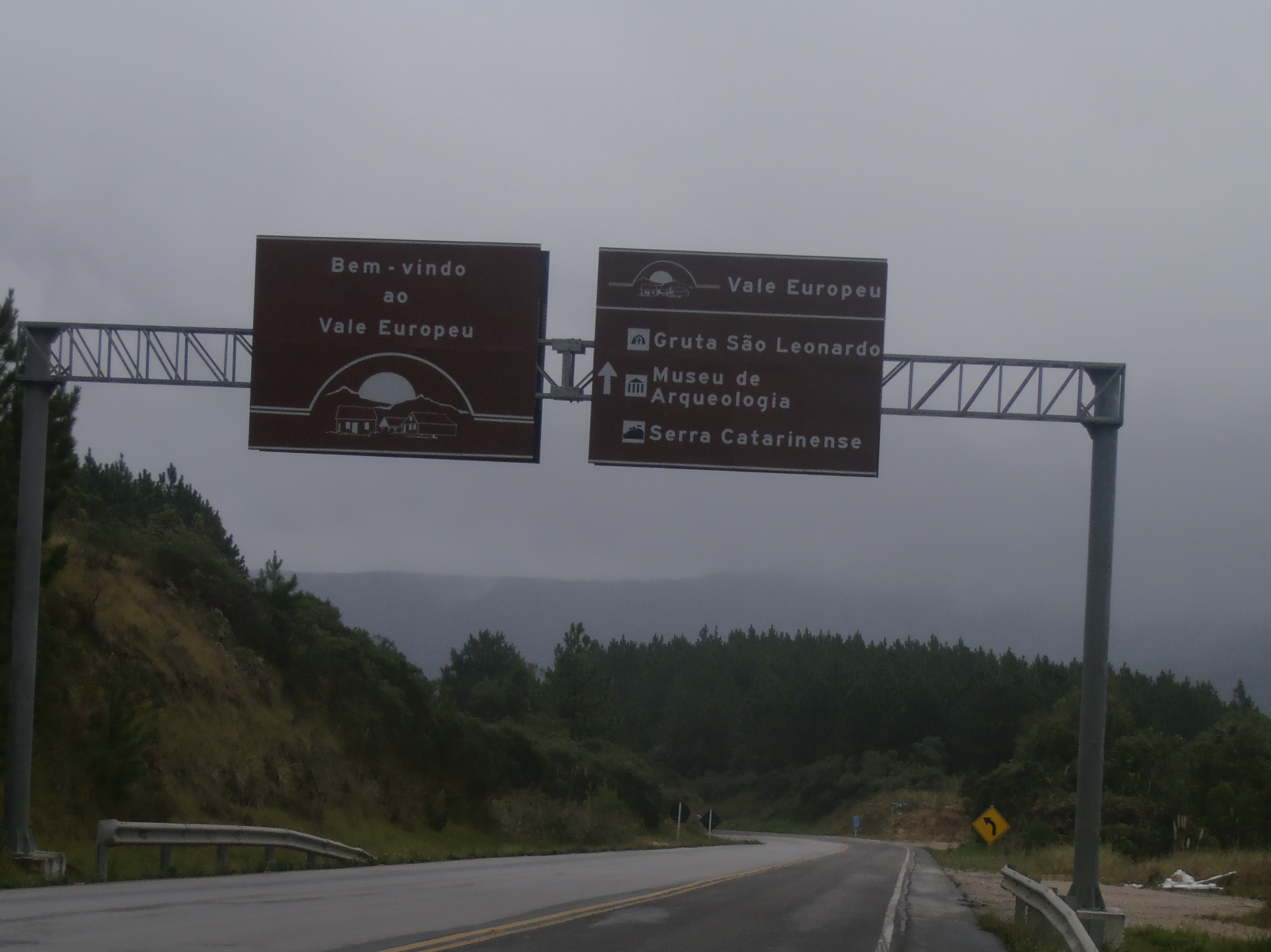
BR-282 near Alfredo Wagner

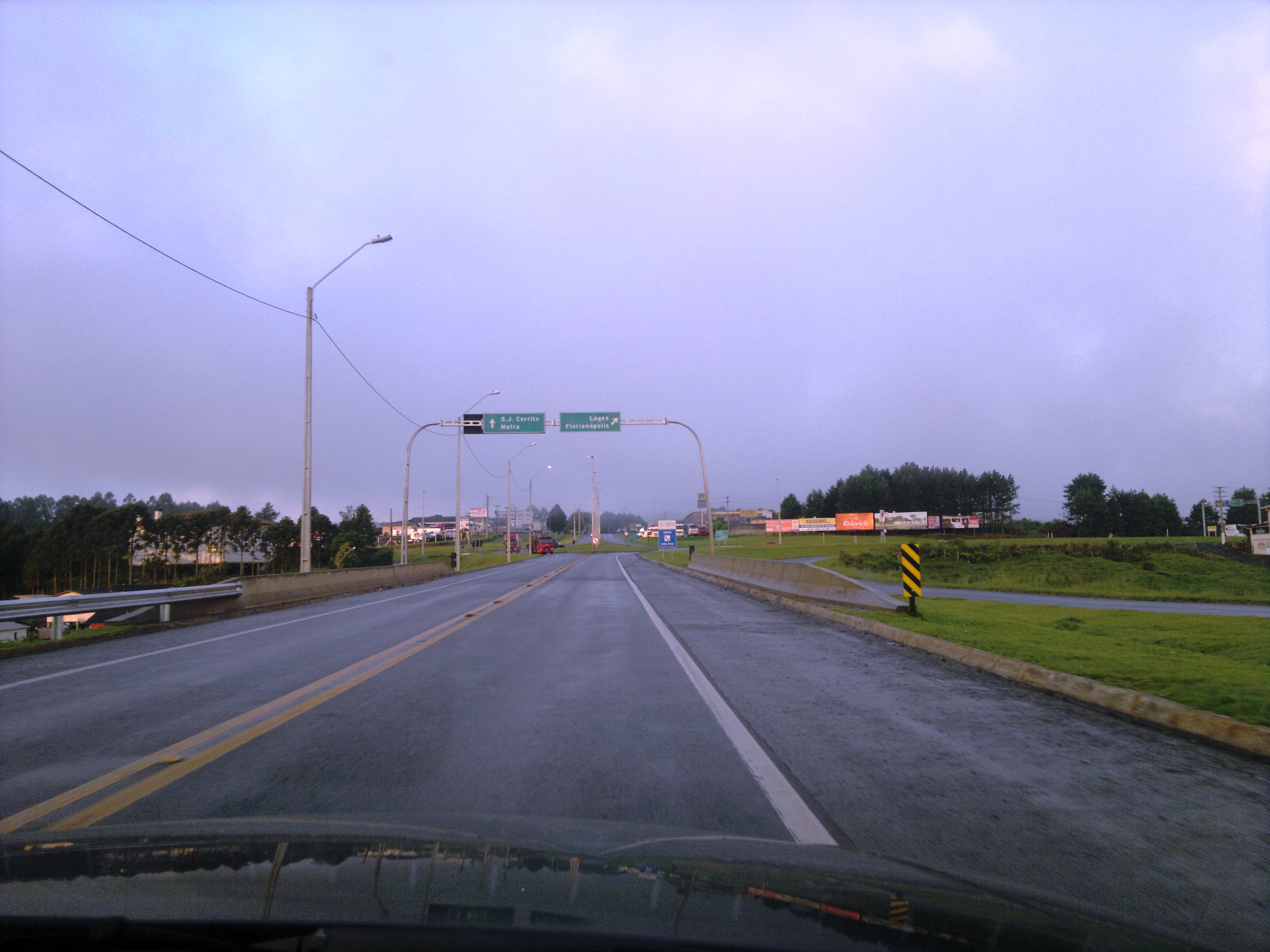
BR-282 near Lages

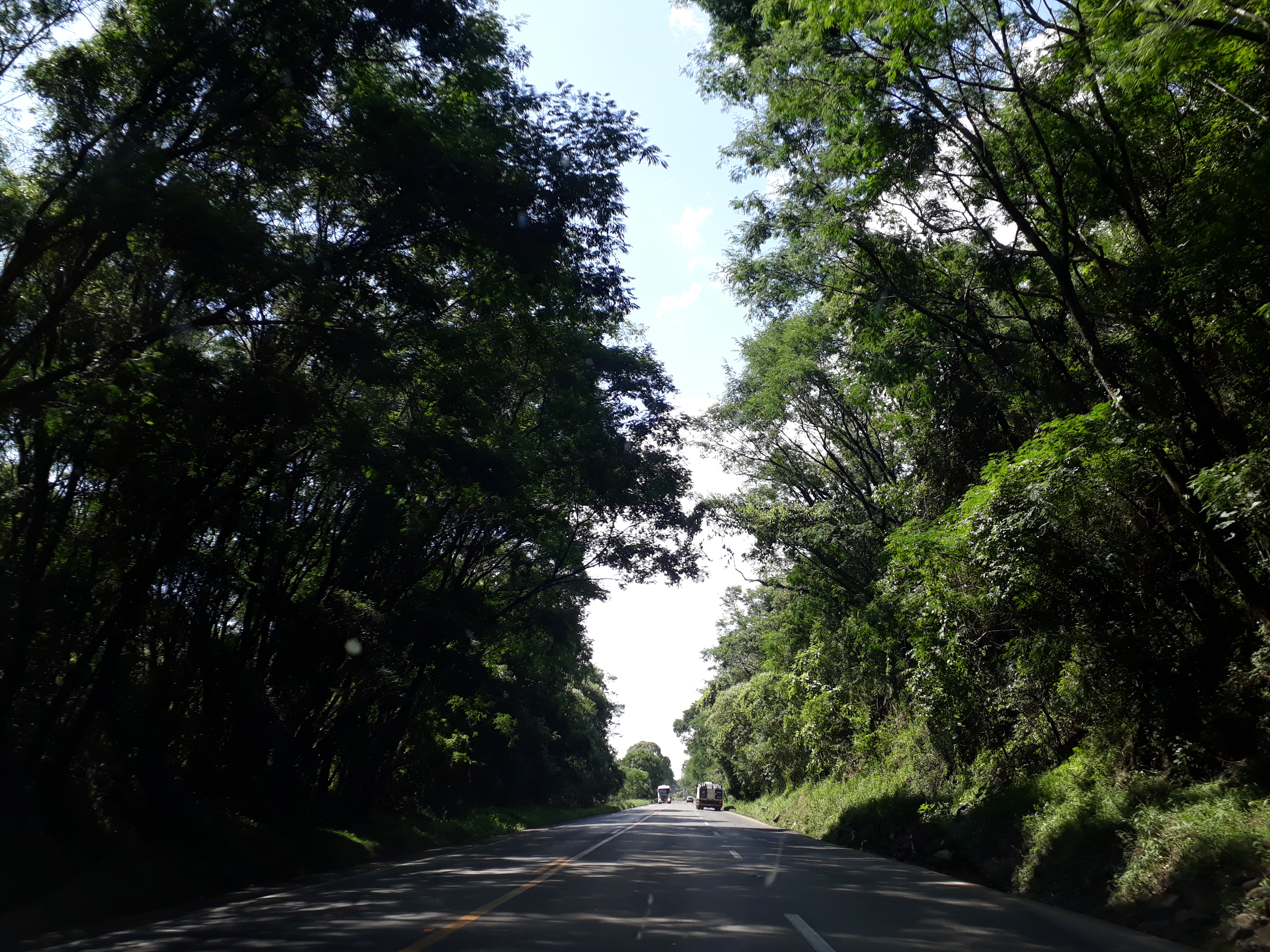
BR-282 near Joaçaba

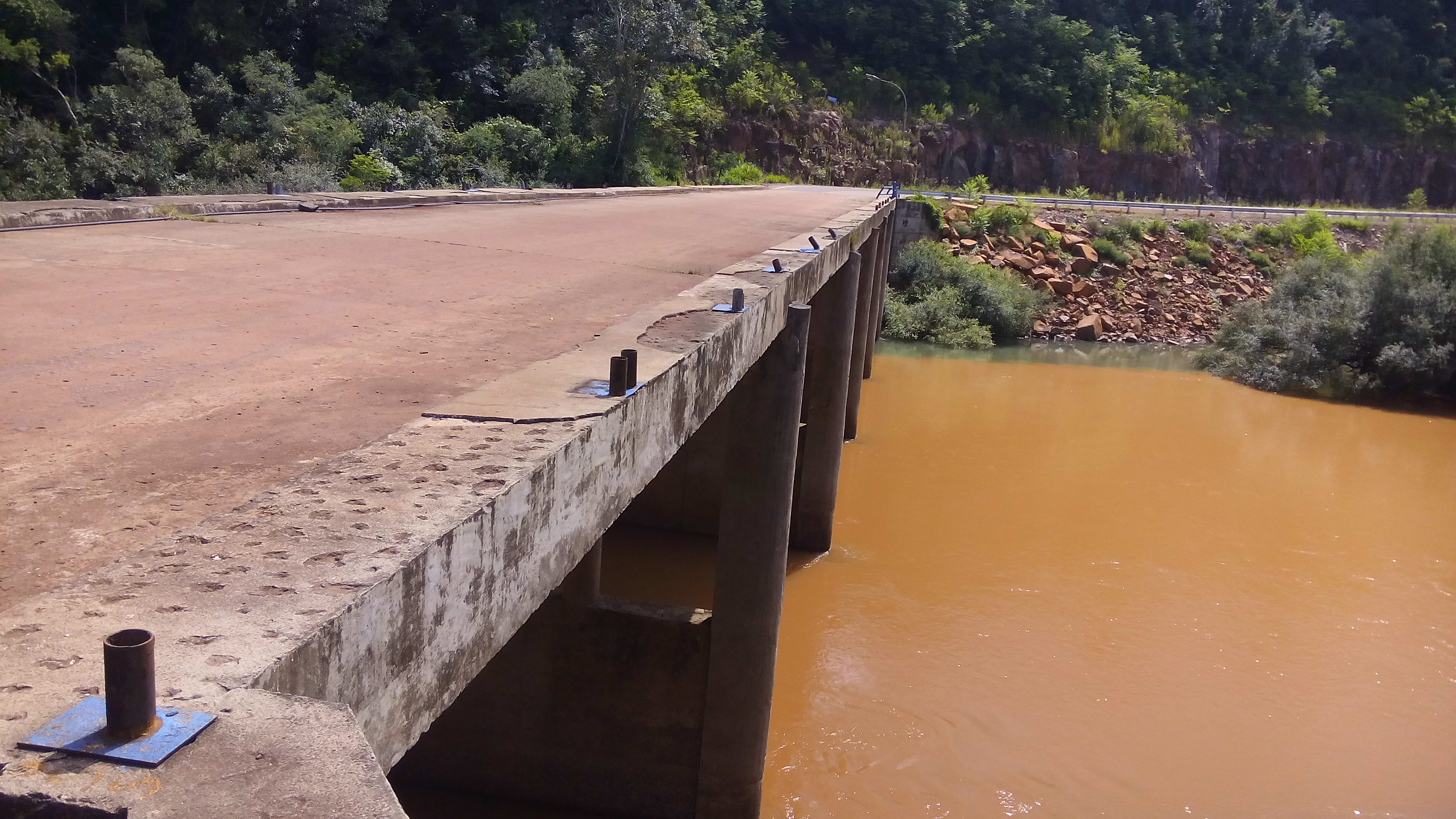
The Comandante Rosales International Bridge marks the end of the BR-282 on the border with Argentina.
