= Passos Maia =

Coordinates: 26.78°S 52.0594°W

- Municipality
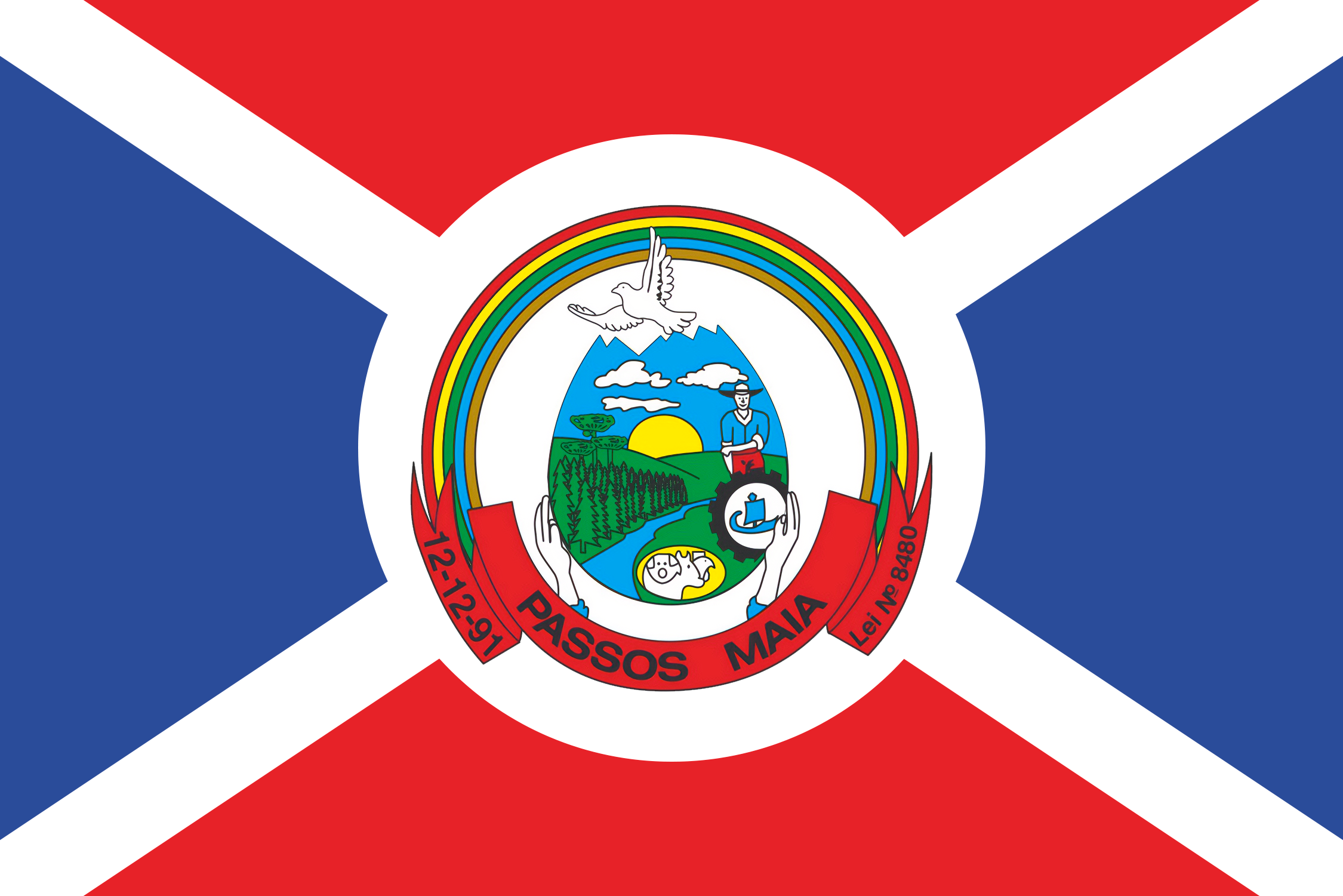
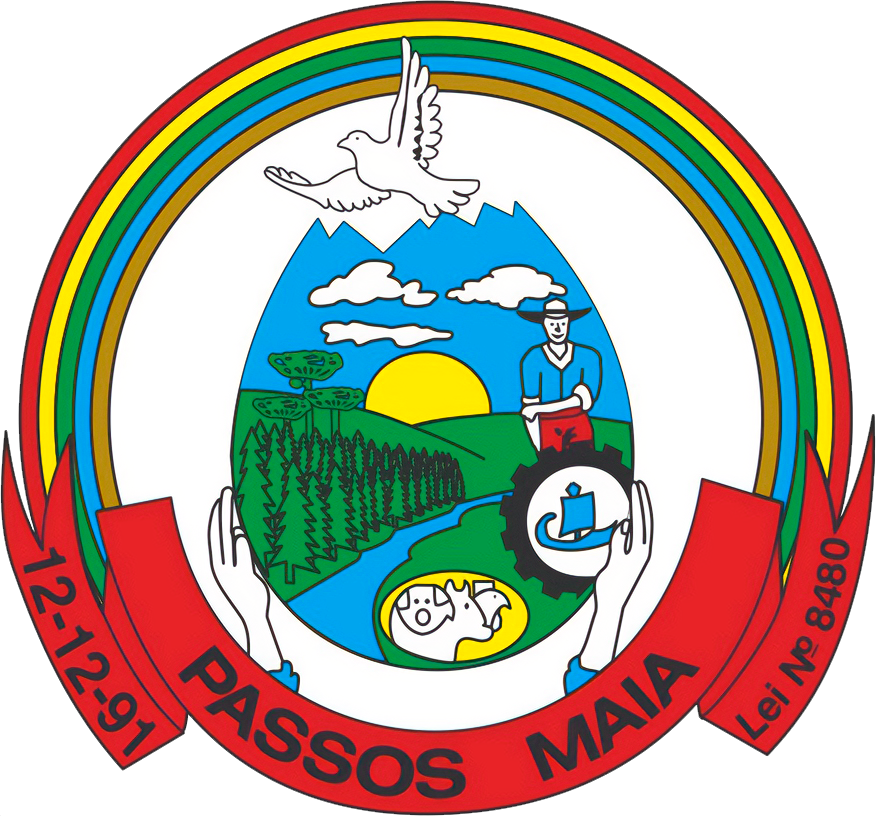
- Flag Coat of arms

- Country: Brazil
- Region: South
- State: Santa Catarina
- Mesoregion: Oeste Catarinense

Population (2020)
  - Total: 4,109
- Time zone: UTC -3
- Website: www.passosmaia.sc.gov.br

Passos Maia is a municipality in the state of Santa Catarina in the South region of Brazil.

The municipality contains part of the Araucárias National Park, a 12,841 hectares (31,730 acres) conservation unit created in 2005.

== See also ==
- List of municipalities in Santa Catarina
