= Ouro Verde, Santa Catarina =

- Municipality
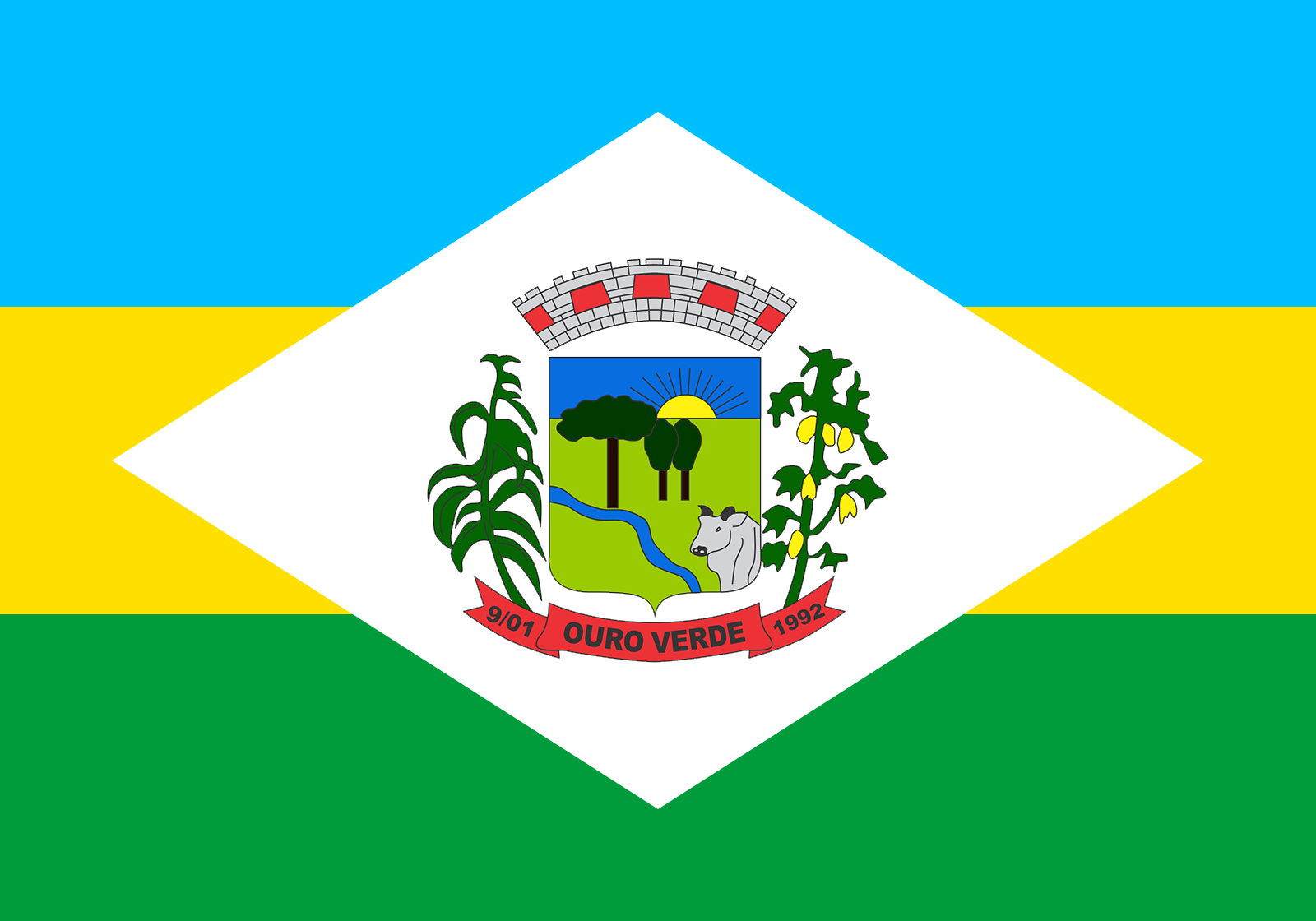
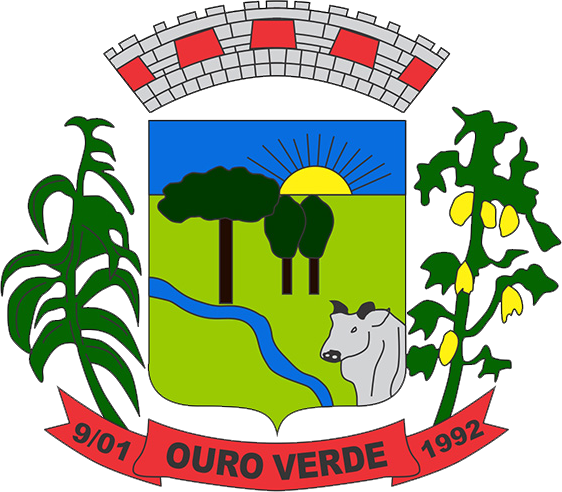
- Flag Coat of arms

- Coordinates: 6°41′34″S 52°18′35″W
- Country: Brazil
- Region: South
- State: Santa Catarina
- Mesoregion: Oeste Catarinense

Government
  - Prefect: Rosane Minetto Selig

Area
  - Total: 73.060 sq mi (189.224 km^{2})
- Elevation: 2,487 ft (758 m)

Population (2020)
  - Total: 2,207
  - Density: 30.21/sq mi (11.66/km^{2})
- Time zone: UTC -3
- Website: www.ouroverde.sc.gov.br

Ouro Verde, Santa Catarina is a municipality in the state of Santa Catarina in the South region of Brazil.

== See also ==
- List of municipalities in Santa Catarina
