= Araguainha crater =

Impact crater in Brazil

- Araguainha dome
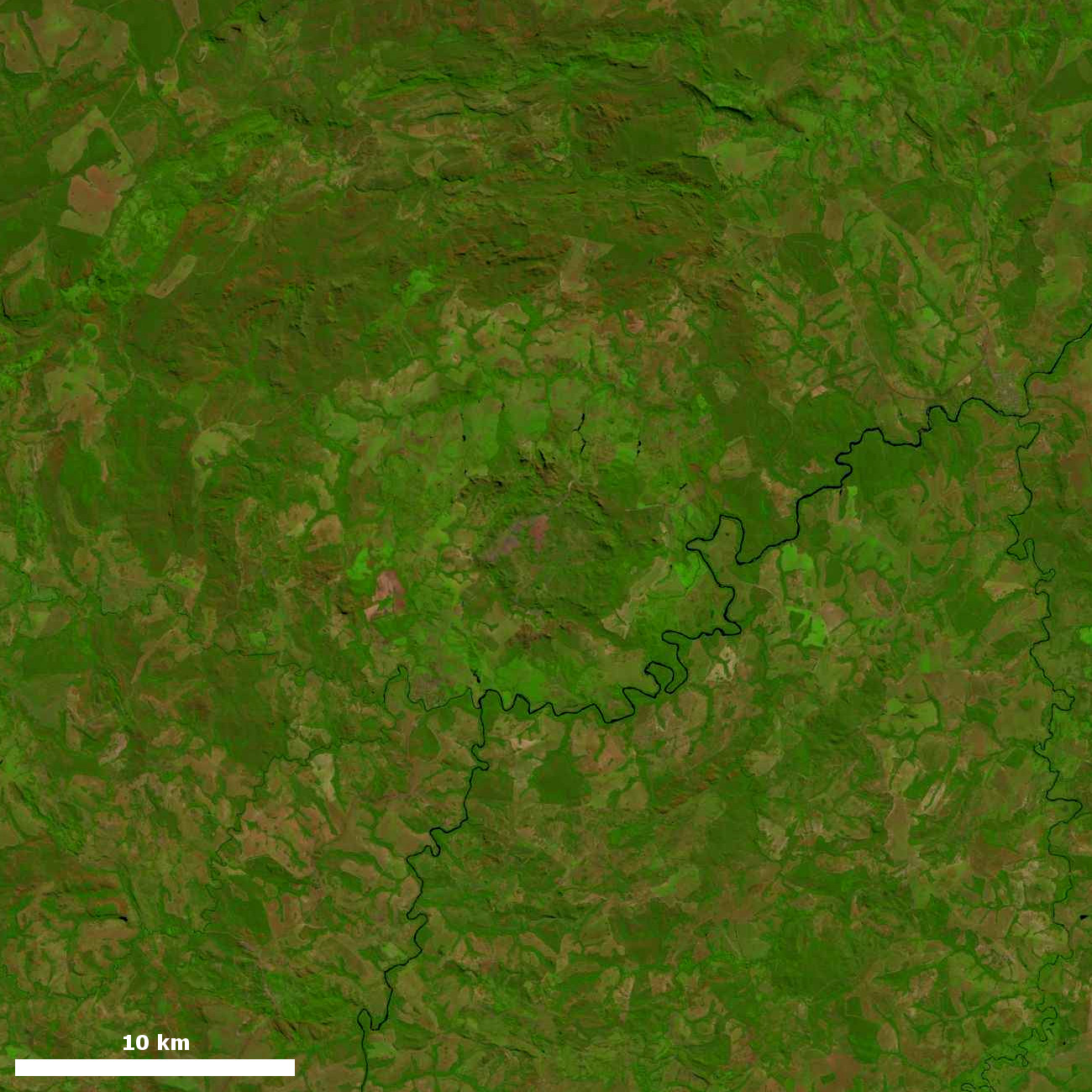
- Landsat image of the Araguainha crater (May 2020)

- Location within Brazil
- Location: Paraná Basin, Araguainha & Ponte Branca, Goiás, Mato Grosso, Brazil; 16°48′S 52°59′W

Impact crater structure
- Confidence: Confirmed
- Diameter: 40 km (25 mi)
- Age: 254.7 ± 2.5 Ma; Permian–Triassic boundary
- Exposed: Yes
- Drilled: No

The Araguainha crater or Araguainha dome is an impact crater on the border of Mato Grosso and Goiás states, Brazil, between the villages of Araguainha and Ponte Branca. With a diameter of 40 kilometres (25 mi), it is the largest known impact crater in South America.

The crater has most recently been dated to 254.7 ± 2.5 million years ago, when the region was probably a shallow sea. The margins of error of this date overlap the time of the Permian–Triassic extinction event, the most severe and catastrophic mass extinction events in Earth's history. The event caused the extinction of 57% of biological families, 62% of genera and 81% of marine species. The impact punched through Paleozoic sedimentary units belonging to the Paraná Basin formations, and exposed the underlying Ordovician granite basement rocks. It is estimated that the crater was initially 24 kilometres (15 mi) wide and 2.4 kilometres (1.5 mi) deep, which then widened to 40 kilometres (25 mi) as its walls subsided inwards.

== Description ==
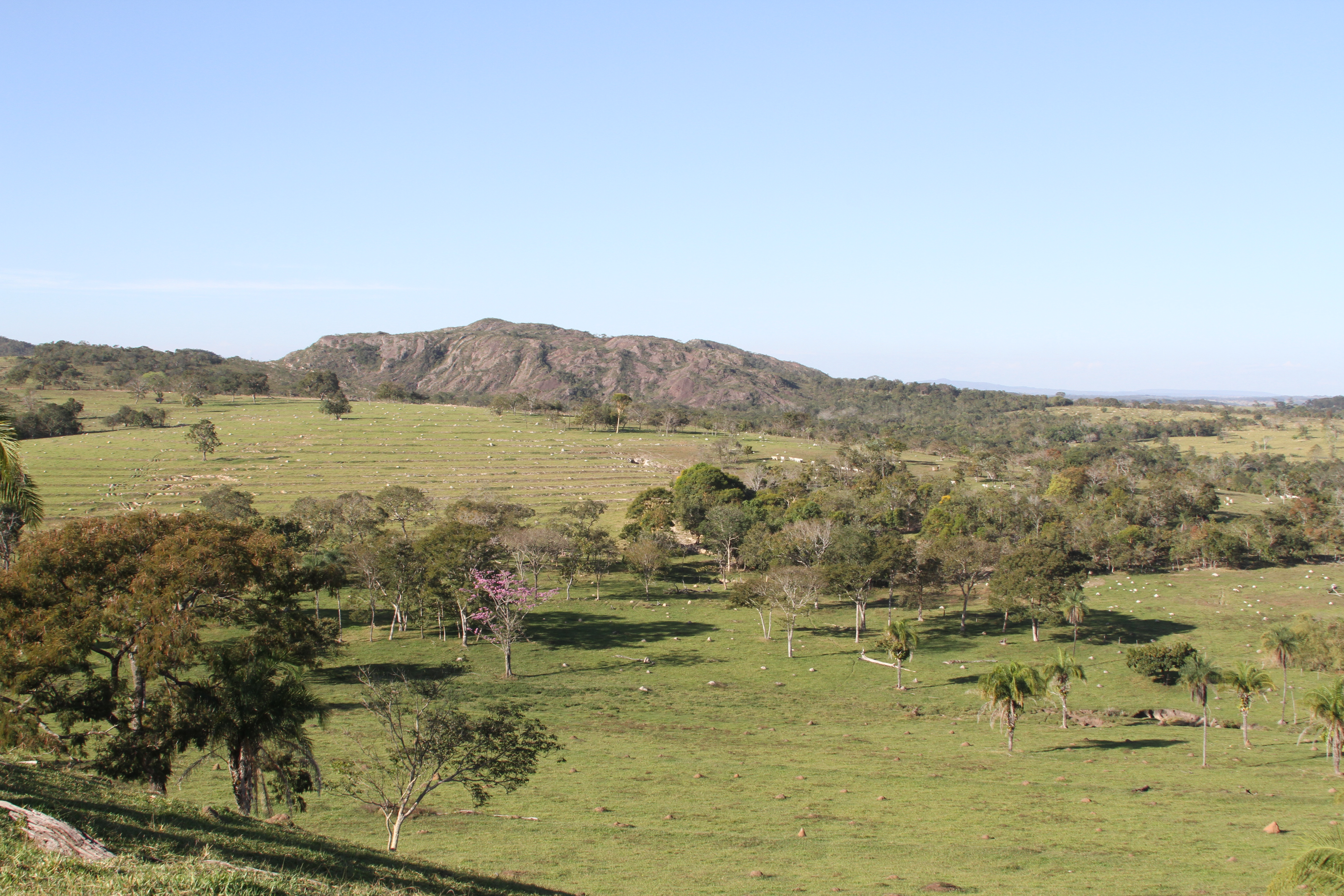
View of part of the central peak complex, by Geraldo C. F. Valadares

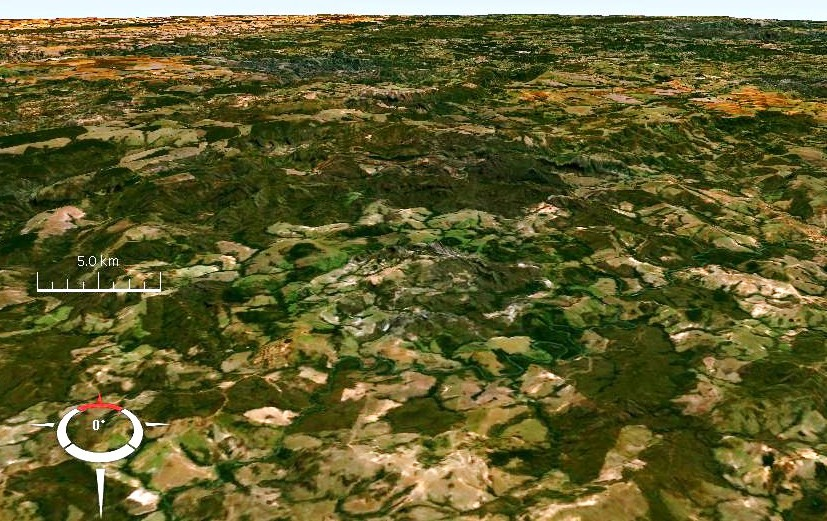
Oblique Landsat image of Araguainha crater draped over digital elevation model (5× vertical exaggeration); screen capture from NASA World Wind

Araguainha is a complex crater with annular and radial faults, exposed to the surface and eroded, cut through by the Araguaia River. The crater has an uplifted central core, shaped like an elliptical basin, consisting of exposed basement granite. Surrounding this core is a ring of shocked granite and overlying breccias; then another ring of ridges and mountains, 6.5 kilometres (4.0 mi) in diameter and up to 150 m (490 ft) high, consisting of folded and steeply tilted Devonian sandstones. This central region is surrounded by an annular depression floored by rocks from Devonian and Carboniferous sandstone formations. The outer rim of the crater consists of remnants of semi-circular grabens in highly deformed Permo-Carboniferous sediments. Evidences of impact origin include shatter cones, impact breccias, and shocked quartz.

In 2026, according to the pre-existing structural asymmetries, a shape of a nine-sides circular polygon is identified for the crater, a data for understanding how the target structure may influence the final shape of impact craters.

== Access and conservation ==
The Araguainha Dome can be reached by car from Goiânia or from Cuiabá. An unpaved state road, between Ponte Branca and Araguainha, cuts across the central uplift, as does the Araguaia River. As of 1999, the local residents were not yet aware of the dome's nature and scientific importance.

== Dating and interpretation ==
The earliest report on the Araguainha structure was published by Northfleet et al. (1969), who interpreted it as an uplift of the Phanerozoic sediments caused by a Cretaceous syenite intrusion. A geological reconnaissance survey by Silveira Filho and Ribeiro (1971) noted the occurrence of lavas, breccias, and tuffs around the central core and deduced that Araguainha was a crypto-volcanic structure. Dietz and French (1973) reported the occurrence of impact breccias and shocked quartz, and recognized the structure as an impact crater. A detailed study of the crater by Crósta et al. (1981) and Crósta (1982) reported further petrological and mineralogical evidence of the impact. Further geomorphologic evidence was published by Theilen-Willige (1981). A magnetic survey was conducted by Fischer and Masero (1994).

Dome formation was first dated (at 243 ± 19 million years ago, with Rb-Sr method) by Deutsch et al. (1992). Engelhardt et al. (1992) published a detailed study of the uplifted core and a revised date of about 246 million years ago, later revised to about 244 million years ago. Most recently it was dated by Tohver et al. (2012) at 254.7 ± 2.5 million years ago.

== Effects ==
Recent dating by Tohver et al. (2012), to 254.7 ± 2.5 million years ago, places the impact at dates overlapping estimates for the Permo-Triassic boundary and the Permian–Triassic extinction event.

Much of the local rock was oil shale. The estimated energy released by the Araguainha impact is insufficient to be a direct cause of the global mass extinction, but the colossal local earth rifting would have released huge amounts of oil and gas from the shattered rock. The resulting sudden global warming might have precipitated the Permian–Triassic extinction.

Evidence of various types of seismites (due to seismic waves with M_{w} 8.6-10), tsunamites (Porangaba Bed) linked to the impact are identified as evidences of a epicontinental megatsunami.
