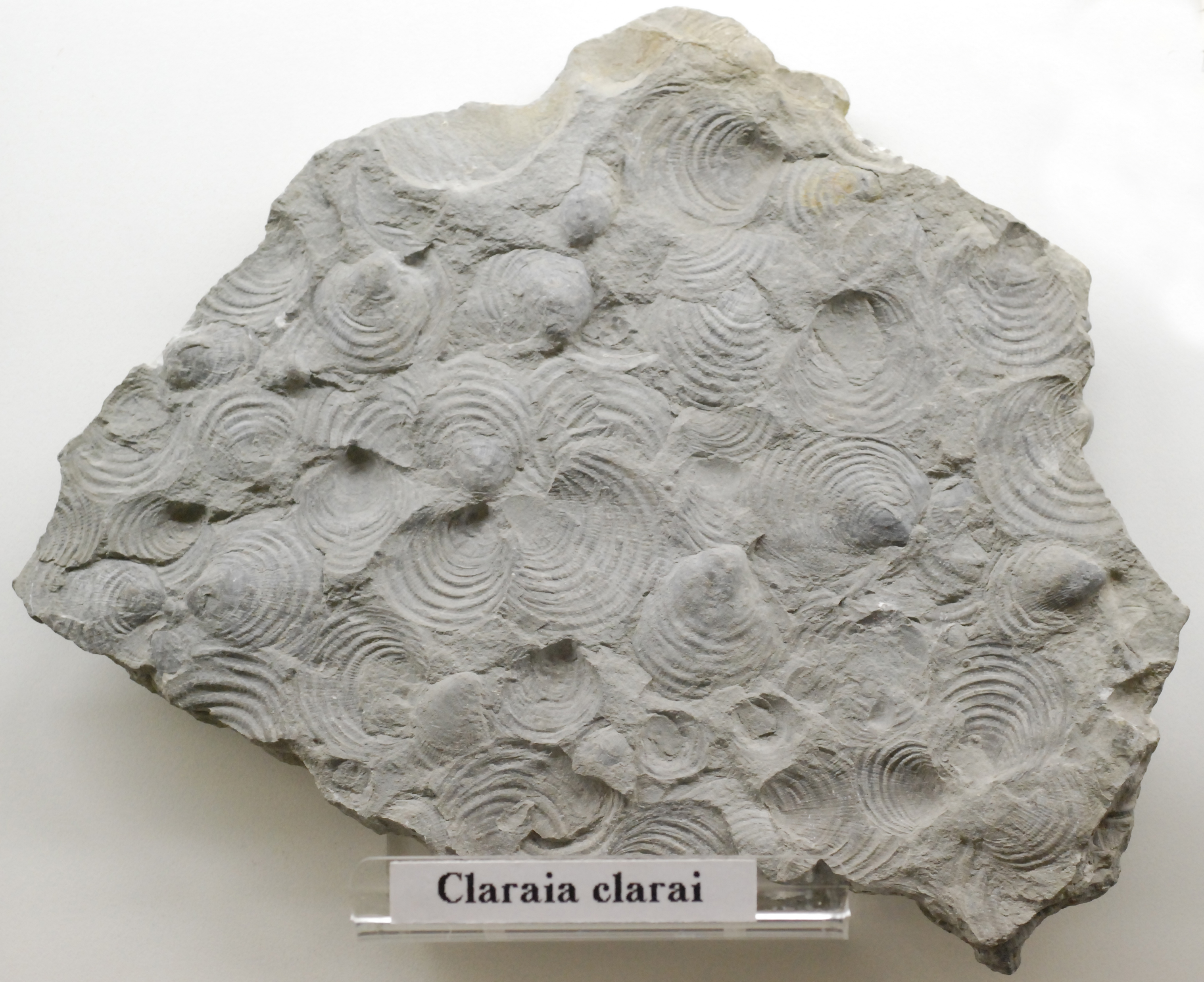
- Claraia clarai from the Werfen Formation

Scientific classification
- Kingdom: Animalia
- Phylum: Mollusca
- Class: Bivalvia
- Order: Pectinida
- Family: †Pterinopectinidae
- Genus: †Claraia; Bittner, 1901

= Claraia =

Claraia Temporal range: 266–237 Ma Guadalupian to Middle Triassic

Extinct genus of bivalves

Claraia is an extinct genus of scallop-like bivalve molluscs that lived from the Capitanian stage of the Middle Permian to the Anisian stage of the Middle Triassic, 266-237 million years ago. Fossils have been found worldwide in North America, Europe, Asia, Africa, and Australia. These are common fossils subsequent to the Permian-Triassic boundary, suggesting that the genus experienced rapid diversification during and after the Permian–Triassic extinction event, around 251.9 million years ago, making it a disaster taxon.

== Ecology ==
Claraia may have been an opportunistic genus that filled the niche of many benthic invertebrates such as brachiopods that were heavily impacted by the extinction. A narrowing of the byssal notch and a trend towards a smoother shell in species of Claraia over time may have led to increased mobility. This increase in mobility may have been an advantage over more sessile animals during the extinction event. It is thought to have lived in anoxic waters at great depths, and therefore may have been better adapted for the anoxic event that may have occurred during the Permian–Triassic extinction event.
