= Crosta =

Crosta is an Italian surname that may refer to:

- Álvaro Penteado Crósta, Brazilian geologist
- Daniele Crosta (born 1970), Italian fencer
- Giancarlo Crosta (born 1934), Italian rower
- Luca Crosta (born 1998), Italian football goalkeeper

== Other uses ==
- Crosta, an Atlantean mutant from Marvel Comics
