= Permian–Triassic extinction event =

Earth's most severe extinction event

Plot of extinction intensity (percentage of marine genera that are present in each interval of time but do not exist in the following interval) vs time in the past. Geological periods are annotated (by abbreviation and colour) above. The Permian–Triassic extinction event is the most significant event for marine genera, with just over 50% (according to this source) perishing. (source and image info)

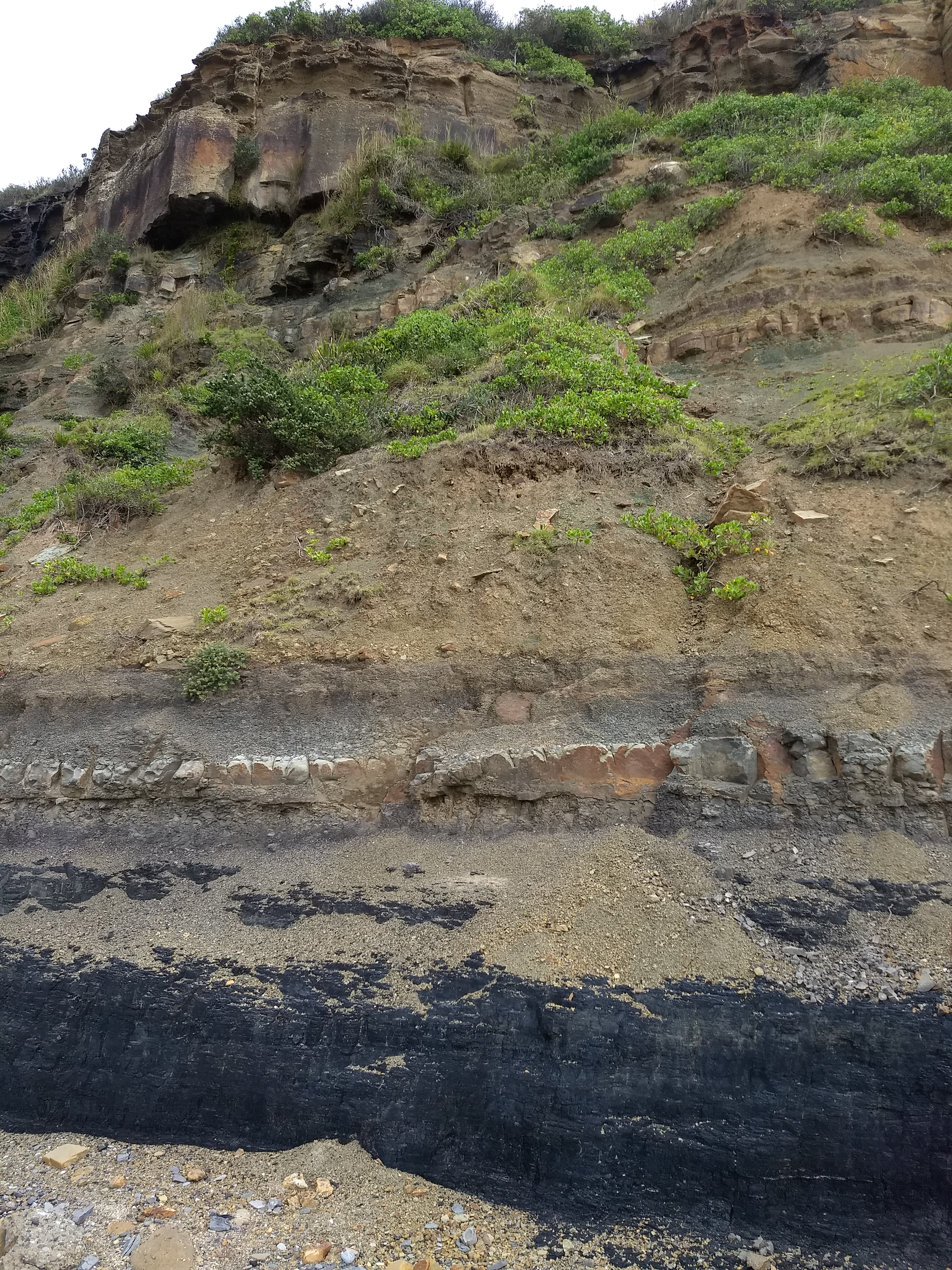
Permian–Triassic boundary at Frazer Beach in New South Wales, with the End Permian extinction event located just above the coal layer

The Permian–Triassic extinction event (Note: also known as the P–T extinction event, the Permian Extinction, the Permian–Triassic Mass Extinction (PTME), the Late Permian extinction event, the Latest Permian extinction event, the End-Permian extinction event, or the Great Dying.) was an extinction event that occurred around the boundary between the Permian and Triassic geologic periods, and with them the Paleozoic and Mesozoic eras. It is Earth's most severe known extinction event, with the extinction of 57% of biological families, 62% of genera, 81% of marine species, and 70% of terrestrial vertebrate species. It is also the greatest known mass extinction of insects. It is the greatest of the "Big Five" mass extinctions of the Phanerozoic. There is evidence for one to three distinct pulses, or phases, of extinction, with the major pulse of marine extinction occurring in a 60,000-100,000 year interval around 251.902 million years ago (mya) marking the boundary between the Permian and Triassic periods. There is some controversy regarding the chronology of the extinctions on land and whether they are synchronous with the main marine extinction event.

The scientific consensus is that the main cause of the extinction was the flood basalt eruptions that created the Siberian Traps, which released sulfur dioxide and carbon dioxide, resulting in euxinia (oxygen-starved, sulfurous oceans), elevated global temperatures, and acidified oceans. The level of atmospheric carbon dioxide rose from around 400 ppm to 2,500 ppm with approximately 3,900 to 12,000 gigatonnes of carbon being added to the ocean-atmosphere system during this period.

Several other contributing factors have been proposed, including the emission of carbon dioxide from the burning of oil and coal deposits ignited by the eruptions; emissions of methane from the gasification of methane clathrates; emissions of methane by novel methanogenic microorganisms nourished by minerals dispersed in the eruptions; longer and more intense El Niño events; and an extraterrestrial impact that created the Araguainha crater and caused seismic release of methane and the destruction of the ozone layer with increased exposure to solar radiation.

== Dating ==
Timeline of recovery
← / Extinction event; ← / δ^{13}C stabilises at +2 ‰. Calcified green algae return; ← / Full recovery of woody trees; ← / Corals return; ← / Scleractinian corals and calcified sponges return; ← / First complex marine ecosystems (Guiyang and Paris biota); ← / End Capitanian extinction
An approximate timeline of recovery after the Permian–Triassic extinction (Axis scale: millions of years ago)

Previously, it was thought that rock sequences spanning the Permian–Triassic boundary were too few and too incomplete for scientists to reliably determine their details. However, it is now possible to date the extinction with millennial precision. U–Pb zircon dates from five volcanic ash beds from the Global Stratotype Section and Point for the Permian–Triassic boundary at Meishan, China, establish a high-resolution age model for the extinction – allowing exploration of the links between global environmental perturbation, carbon cycle disruption, mass extinction, and recovery at millennial timescales. The first appearance of the conodont Hindeodus parvus has been used to delineate the Permian-Triassic boundary.

The extinction occurred between 251.941 ± 0.037 and 251.880 ± 0.031 million years ago, a duration of 60 ± 48 thousand years. A large, abrupt global decrease in δ^{13}C, the ratio of the stable isotope carbon-13 to that of carbon-12, coincides with this extinction, and is sometimes used to identify the Permian–Triassic boundary and the Permian-Triassic Mass Extinction event (PTME) in rocks that are unsuitable for radiometric dating. The negative carbon isotope excursion's magnitude was 4–7% and lasted for approximately 500,000 years, though estimating its exact value is challenging due to diagenetic alteration of many sedimentary facies spanning the boundary.

Further evidence for environmental change around the Permian-Triassic boundary suggests an 8 °C (14 °F) rise in temperature, and an increase in CO_{2} levels to 2,500 ppm (for comparison, the concentration immediately before the Industrial Revolution was 280 ppm, and the amount today is about 426 ppm). There is also evidence of increased ultraviolet radiation reaching Earth, causing mutation in plant spores.

It has been suggested that the Permian–Triassic boundary is associated with a sharp increase in the abundance of marine and terrestrial fungi, caused by the sharp increase in the amount of dead plants and animals fed upon by the fungi. This "fungal spike" has been used by some paleontologists to identify a lithological sequence as being on or very close to the Permian–Triassic boundary in rocks that are unsuitable for radiometric dating or have a lack of suitable index fossils. However, even the proposers of the fungal spike hypothesis pointed out that "fungal spikes" may have been a repeating phenomenon created by the post-extinction ecosystem during the earliest Triassic. The very idea of a fungal spike has been criticized on several grounds, including: Reduviasporonites, the most common supposed fungal spore, may be a fossilized alga; the spike did not appear worldwide; and in many places it did not fall on the Permian–Triassic boundary. The Reduviasporonites may even represent a transition to a lake-dominated Triassic world rather than an earliest Triassic zone of death and decay in some terrestrial fossil beds. Newer chemical evidence agrees better with a fungal origin for Reduviasporonites, diluting these critiques.

Uncertainty exists regarding the duration of the overall extinction and about the timing and duration of various groups' extinctions within the greater process. Some evidence suggests that there were multiple extinction pulses or that the extinction was long and spread out over a few million years, with a sharp peak in the last million years of the Permian. Statistical analyses of some highly fossiliferous strata in Meishan, Zhejiang Province in southeastern China, suggest that the main extinction was clustered around one peak, while a study of the Liangfengya section found evidence of two extinction waves, MEH-1 and MEH-2, which varied in their causes, and a study of the Shangsi section also showed two extinction pulses with different causes. Recent research shows that different groups became extinct at different times; for example, while difficult to date absolutely, ostracod and brachiopod extinctions were separated by around 670,000 to 1.17 million years. Paleoenvironmental analysis of Lopingian strata in the Bowen Basin of Queensland indicates numerous intermittent periods of marine environmental stress from the middle to late Lopingian leading up to the end-Permian extinction proper, supporting aspects of the gradualist hypothesis. The decline in marine species richness and the structural collapse of marine ecosystems may have been decoupled as well, with the former preceding the latter by about 61,000 years according to one study.

Whether the terrestrial and marine extinctions were synchronous or asynchronous is another point of controversy. Evidence from a well-preserved sequence in east Greenland suggests that the terrestrial and marine extinctions began simultaneously. In this sequence, the decline of animal life is concentrated over approximately 10,000 to 60,000 years, with plants taking an additional several hundred thousand years to show the full impact of the event. Many sedimentary sequences from South China show synchronous terrestrial and marine extinctions. Research in the Sydney Basin of the PTME's duration and course also supports a synchronous occurrence of the terrestrial and marine biotic collapses. Other scientists believe the terrestrial mass extinction began between 60,000 and 370,000 years before the onset of the marine mass extinction. Chemostratigraphic analysis from sections in Finnmark and Trøndelag shows the terrestrial floral turnover occurred before the large negative δ^{13}C shift during the marine extinction. Dating of the boundary between the Dicynodon and Lystrosaurus assemblage zones in the Karoo Basin indicates that the terrestrial extinction occurred earlier than the marine extinction. The Sunjiagou Formation of South China also records a terrestrial ecosystem demise predating the marine crisis. Other research has still found that the terrestrial extinction occurred after the marine extinction in the tropics.

Studies of the timing and causes of the Permian-Triassic extinction are complicated by the often-overlooked Capitanian extinction (also called the Guadalupian extinction), just one of perhaps two mass extinctions in the late Permian that closely preceded the Permian-Triassic event. In short, when the Permian-Triassic starts, it is difficult to know whether the end-Capitanian had finished. Many of the extinctions once dated to the Permian-Triassic boundary have more recently been re-dated to the end-Capitanian. Further, it is unclear whether some species that survived the prior extinction(s) had recovered sufficiently for their final demise during the Permian-Triassic event to be considered separate from the Capitanian event. A minority view holds that the sequence of environmental disasters has effectively constituted a single, prolonged extinction event, though this may depend on which species is considered. This older theory, still supported in some recent papers, proposes that there were two major extinction pulses 9.4 million years apart, separated by a period of extinctions that were less extensive, but still well above the background level, and that the final extinction killed about 80% of marine species alive at that time, whereas the other losses occurred during the first pulse or the interval between pulses. According to this theory, one of these extinction pulses occurred at the end of the Guadalupian epoch of the Permian. For example, all dinocephalian genera died out at the end of the Guadalupian, as did the Verbeekinidae, a family of large-size fusuline foraminifera. The impact of the end-Guadalupian extinction on marine organisms appears to have varied between locations and between taxonomic groups – brachiopods and corals had severe losses.

== Extinction patterns ==
Marine extinctions	Genera extinct	Notes
Hyolitha	100%	In decline for a long time before the extinction event and was rare by the Permian.
Arthropoda
Ostracods	74%	
Trilobites	100%	In decline since the Devonian; only 5 genera living before the extinction
Brachiopoda
Brachiopods	96%	Orthids and orthotetids died out, and productids would die out shortly after
Bryozoa
Bryozoans	79%	Fenestrates, trepostomes, and cryptostomes died out
Cnidaria
Anthozoans	96%	Tabulate and rugose corals died out
Echinodermata
Blastoids	100%	
Crinoids	98%	Inadunates and camerates died out
Mollusca
Ammonites	97%	Goniatites and Prolecantids died out
Bivalves	59%	
Gastropods	98%	
Retaria
Foraminiferans	97%	Fusulinids died out, but were almost extinct before the catastrophe
Radiolarians	99%	

=== Marine organisms ===
Marine invertebrates suffered the greatest losses during the P–Tr extinction, although previous estimates of 90–96% marine species extinction were due to historical conflation with the end-Capitanian mass extinction, which occurred 7–10 million years earlier. Evidence of these losses was found in samples from south China sections at the P–Tr boundary. Here, 286 out of 329 marine invertebrate genera disappear within the final two sedimentary zones containing conodonts from the Permian. The decrease in diversity was probably caused by a sharp increase in extinctions, rather than a decrease in speciation.

The extinction primarily affected organisms with calcium carbonate skeletons, especially those that relied on stable CO_{2} levels to produce them. These organisms were susceptible to the effects of the ocean acidification that resulted from increased atmospheric CO_{2}. Organisms that relied on haemocyanin or haemoglobin for transporting oxygen were more resistant to extinction than those utilizing hemerythrin or oxygen diffusion. There is also evidence that endemism was a strong risk factor influencing a taxon's likelihood of extinction. Bivalve taxa that were endemic and localized to a specific region were more likely to go extinct than cosmopolitan taxa. There was little latitudinal difference in the survival rates of taxa. Organisms that inhabited refugia less affected by global warming experienced lesser or delayed extinctions.

Among benthic organisms the extinction event multiplied background extinction rates, and therefore caused maximum species loss to taxa that had a high background extinction rate (by implication, taxa with a high turnover). The extinction rate of marine organisms was catastrophic. Bioturbators were extremely severely affected, as evidenced by the loss of the sedimentary mixed layer in many marine facies during the end-Permian extinction.

Surviving marine invertebrate groups included articulate brachiopods (those with a hinge), which had undergone a slow decline in numbers since the P–Tr extinction; the Ceratitida order of ammonites; and crinoids ("sea lilies"), which very nearly became extinct but later became abundant and diverse. The groups with the highest survival rates generally had active control of circulation, elaborate gas exchange mechanisms, and light calcification; more heavily calcified organisms with simpler breathing apparatuses suffered the greatest loss of species diversity. In the case of the brachiopods, at least, surviving taxa were generally small, rare members of a formerly diverse community.

Conodonts were severely affected in both taxonomic and morphological diversity, though not as severely as during the Capitanian mass extinction.

The ammonoids, which had been in a long-term decline for the 30-million years since the Roadian (middle Permian), suffered a selective extinction pulse 10-million years before the main event, at the end of the Capitanian stage. In this preliminary extinction, which greatly reduced disparity, or the range of different ecological guilds, environmental factors were apparently responsible. Diversity and disparity fell further until the P–Tr boundary; the extinction here (P–Tr) was non-selective, consistent with a catastrophic initiator. During the Triassic, diversity rose rapidly, but disparity remained low. The range of morphospace occupied by the ammonoids, that is, their range of possible forms, shapes or structures, became more restricted as the Permian progressed. A few million years into the Triassic, the original range of ammonoid structures was once again reoccupied, but the parameters were now shared differently among clades.

Ostracods experienced prolonged diversity perturbations during the Changhsingian before the PTME proper, when immense proportions of them abruptly vanished. At least 74% of ostracods died out during the PTME itself.

Bryozoans had been on a long-term decline throughout the Late Permian epoch before they suffered even more catastrophic losses during the PTME, being the most severely affected clade among the lophophorates.

Deep-water sponges experienced significant loss of diversity and a decrease in spicule size over the course of the PTME. Shallow-water sponges were affected much less strongly; they experienced an increase in spicule size and a much lower loss of morphological diversity compared to their deep-water counterparts.

Foraminifera experienced a severe diversity bottleneck. Evidence from South China indicates the foraminiferal extinction had two pulses. Foraminiferal biodiversity hotspots shifted into deeper waters during the PTME. Approximately 93% of latest Permian foraminifera became extinct, with 50% of the clade Textulariina, 92% of Lagenida, 96% of Fusulinida, and 100% of Miliolida disappearing. Foraminifera that were calcareous suffered an extinction rate of 91%. The reasons why lagenides survived while fusulinoidean fusulinides went completely extinct may have been the greater range of environmental tolerance and greater geographic distribution of the former compared to the latter.

Marine chondrichthyans overall were extremely resilient, exhibiting not elevated extinction rates. Cladodontomorph sharks were able to survive the PTME, with some ctenacanth genera including Amelacanthus surviving the entirety of the event and into the Early Triassic in refugia areas such as the waters of what is today Oman. Multiple lineages of cladodontomorphs also survived the PTME as indicated by additional post-PTME records of ctenacanths in Early Triassic deposits from the Bear Lake Area of Idaho, U.S. alongside potentially from the Vega-Phroso Siltstone Member of the Sulphur Mountains Formation of British Columbia, Canada. The cladodontomorphs were able to survive the PTME by likely utilizing the deep oceans as specific zones of refugia, a hypothesis based on the discovery of Early Cretaceous cladodontomorphs in deep, outer shelf environments. Ichthyosaurs, which evolved immediately before the PTME, were also PTME survivors.

The Lilliput effect, the phenomenon of dwarfing of species during and immediately following a mass extinction event, has been observed across the Permian-Triassic boundary, notably occurring in foraminifera, brachiopods, bivalves, and ostracods. Though gastropods that survived the cataclysm were smaller in size than those that did not, it remains debated whether the Lilliput effect truly took hold among gastropods. Some gastropod taxa, termed "Gulliver gastropods", ballooned in size during and immediately following the mass extinction, exemplifying the Lilliput effect's opposite, which has been dubbed the Brobdingnag effect.

=== Terrestrial invertebrates ===
The Permian had great diversity in insect and other invertebrate species, including the largest insects ever to have existed. The end-Permian is the largest known mass extinction of insects; according to some sources, it may well be the only mass extinction to affect insect diversity significantly. Eight or nine insect orders became extinct and ten more were greatly reduced in diversity. Palaeodictyopteroids (insects with piercing and sucking mouthparts) began to decline during the mid-Permian; these extinctions have been linked to a change in flora. The greatest decline occurred in the Late Permian and was probably not directly caused by weather-related floral transitions. However, some observed entomofaunal declines in the PTME were biogeographic changes rather than outright extinctions.

=== Terrestrial plants ===
The geological record of terrestrial plants is sparse and based mostly on pollen and spore studies. Floral changes across the Permian-Triassic boundary are highly variable depending on the location and preservation quality of any given site. Plants are relatively immune to mass extinction, with the impact of all the major mass extinctions "insignificant" at a family level. Floral diversity losses were more superficial than those of marine animals. Even the reduction observed in species diversity (of 50%) may be mostly due to taphonomic processes. However, a massive rearrangement of ecosystems does occur, with plant abundances and distributions changing profoundly and all the forests virtually disappearing. The dominant floral groups changed, with many groups of land plants entering abrupt decline, such as Cordaites (gymnosperms) and Glossopteris (seed ferns). The severity of plant extinction has been disputed.

The Glossopteris-dominated flora that characterized high-latitude Gondwana collapsed in Australia around 370,000 years before the Permian-Triassic boundary, with this flora's collapse being less constrained in western Gondwana but still likely occurring a few hundred thousand years before the boundary. The collapse of this flora is indirectly marked by an abrupt change in river morphology from meandering to braided river systems, signifying the widespread demise of rooted plants.

Palynological (pollen) studies from East Greenland of sedimentary rock strata laid down during the extinction period indicate dense gymnosperm woodlands before the event. At the same time that marine invertebrate macrofauna declined, these large woodlands died out and were followed by a rise in diversity of smaller herbaceous plants including Lycopodiophyta, both Selaginellales and Isoetales. Data from Kap Stosch suggest that floral species richness was not significantly affected during the PTME.

The Cordaites flora, which dominated the Angaran floristic realm corresponding to Siberia, collapsed during the extinction. In the Kuznetsk Basin, the aridity-induced extinction of the regional humid-adapted forest flora dominated by cordaitaleans occurred approximately 252.76 Ma, around 820,000 years before the end-Permian extinction in South China, suggesting that the end-Permian biotic catastrophe may have started earlier on land and that the ecological crisis may have been more gradual and asynchronous on land compared to its more abrupt onset in the marine realm.

In North China, the transition between the Upper Shihhotse and Sunjiagou Formations and their lateral equivalents marked a major plant extinction event. Those plant genera that did not go extinct still experienced a great reduction in their geographic range. Following this transition, coal swamps vanished. The North Chinese floral extinction correlates with the decline of the Gigantopteris flora of South China.

In South China, the subtropical Cathaysian gigantopterid dominated rainforests abruptly collapsed. The floral extinction in South China is associated with bacterial blooms in soil and nearby lacustrine ecosystems, with soil erosion resulting from the die-off of plants being their likely cause. Wildfires too likely played a role in the fall of Gigantopteris.

A conifer flora in what is now Jordan, known from fossils near the Dead Sea, showed unusual stability over the Permian-Triassic transition, and appears to have been only minimally affected by the crisis.

=== Terrestrial vertebrates ===
The tempo of the terrestrial vertebrate extinction is disputed. Some evidence from the Karoo Basin indicates a protracted extinction lasting a million years. Other evidence from the Karoo deposits suggest it took 50,000 years or less, while a study of coprolites in the Vyazniki fossil beds in Russia suggests it took only a few thousand years. Aridification induced by global warming was the chief culprit behind terrestrial vertebrate extinctions. High herbivore mortality in turn drove carnivore extinctions. There is evidence that over two thirds of terrestrial labyrinthodont amphibians, sauropsid ("reptile") and therapsid ("proto-mammal") taxa became extinct. Large herbivores suffered the heaviest losses.

All Permian anapsid reptiles died out except the procolophonids (although testudines have morphologically-anapsid skulls, they are now thought to have separately evolved from diapsid ancestors). Pelycosaurs died out before the end of the Permian. Too few Permian diapsid fossils have been found to support any conclusion about the effect of the Permian extinction on diapsids (the "reptile" group from which lizards, snakes, crocodilians, and dinosaurs (including birds) evolved). Tangasaurids were largely unaffected. The PTME represented the largest extinction of anomodonts in their evolutionary history. Gorgonopsians were thought to have gone extinction during PTME, with supposed Early Triassic fossils being revised to the Late Permian. Freshwater and euryhaline fishes, having experienced minimal diversity losses before the PTME, were unaffected during the PTME and actually appear to have increased in diversity across the Permian-Triassic boundary. However, faunal turnovers in freshwater fish communities occurred in areas like the Kuznetsk Basin.

The groups that survived suffered extremely heavy losses of species, and some terrestrial vertebrate groups very nearly became extinct at the end of the Permian. Some of the surviving groups did not persist beyond this period, but others that barely survived went on to produce diverse and long-lasting lineages. However, it took 30 million years for the terrestrial vertebrate fauna to fully recover both numerically and ecologically.

It is difficult to estimate extinction and survival rates of land organisms because few terrestrial fossil beds span the Permian–Triassic boundary. The best-known record of vertebrate changes across the Permian–Triassic boundary occurs in the Karoo Supergroup of South Africa, but statistical analyses have so far not produced clear conclusions. One study of the Karoo Basin found that 69% of terrestrial vertebrates went extinct over 300,000 years leading up to the Permian-Triassic boundary, followed by a minor extinction pulse involving four taxa that survived the previous extinction interval. Another study of the latest Permian vertebrates in the Karoo Basin found that 54% of them went extinct due to the PTME.

== Biotic recovery ==
In the wake of the extinction event, the ecological structure of the present-day biosphere evolved from the stock of surviving taxa. In the sea, the "Paleozoic evolutionary fauna" declined while the "modern evolutionary fauna" achieved greater dominance; the Permian-Triassic mass extinction marked a key turning point in this ecological shift that began after the Capitanian mass extinction and culminated in the Late Jurassic. Typical taxa of shelly benthic faunas were now bivalves, snails, sea urchins and Malacostraca, whereas bony fishes and marine reptiles diversified in the pelagic zone. On land, dinosaurs and mammals arose in the course of the Triassic. The profound change in the taxonomic composition was partly a result of the selectivity of the extinction event, which affected some taxa (e.g., brachiopods) more severely than others (e.g., bivalves). However, recovery was also differential between taxa. Some survivors became extinct some million years after the extinction event without having rediversified (dead clade walking, e.g. the snail family Bellerophontidae), whereas others rose to dominance over geologic times (e.g., bivalves).

=== Marine ecosystems ===
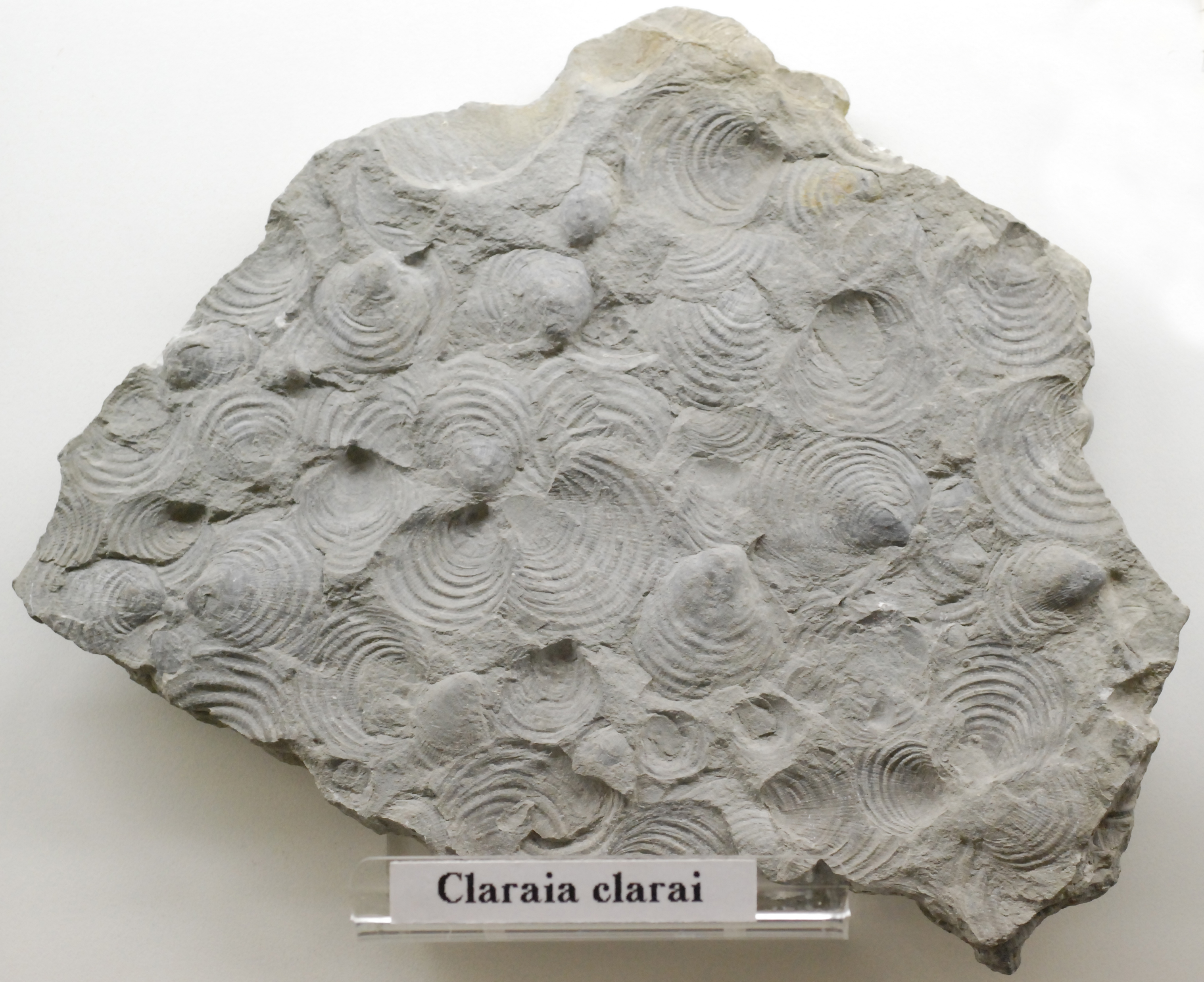
Shell bed with the bivalve Claraia clarai, a common early Triassic disaster taxon

A cosmopolitanism event began immediately after the end-Permian extinction event. Marine post-extinction faunas were mostly species-poor and were dominated by few disaster taxa such as the bivalves Claraia, Unionites, Eumorphotis, and Promyalina, the conodonts Clarkina and Hindeodus, the inarticulate brachiopod Lingularia, and the foraminifera Earlandia and Rectocornuspira kalhori, the latter of which is sometimes classified under the genus Ammodiscus. Their guild diversity was also low. Post-PTME faunas had a flat, insignificant latitudinal diversity gradient, and showed high ecophysiological homogeneity.

The speed of recovery from the extinction is disputed. Some scientists estimate that it took 10-million years (until the Middle Triassic) because of the severity of the extinction. However, studies in Bear Lake County, near Paris, Idaho, and nearby sites in Idaho and Nevada showed a relatively quick rebound in a localized Early Triassic marine ecosystem (Paris biota), taking around 1.3-million years to recover, while an unusually diverse and complex ichnobiota is known from Italy less than a million years after the end-Permian extinction. Additionally, the complex Guiyang biota found near Guiyang, China also indicates life thrived in some places just a million years after the mass extinction, as does a fossil assemblage known as the Shanggan fauna found in Shanggan, China, the Wangmo biota from the Luolou Formation of Guizhou, and a gastropod fauna from the Al Jil Formation of Oman. Regional differences in the pace of biotic recovery existed, which suggests that the impact of the extinction may have been felt less severely in some areas than others, with differential environmental stress and instability being the source of the variance. High latitude ecosystems may have recovered faster due to high post-extinction primary productivity. In addition, it has been proposed that although overall taxonomic diversity rebounded rapidly, functional ecological diversity took much longer to return to its pre-extinction levels; one study concluded that marine ecological recovery was still ongoing 50 million years after the extinction, during the latest Triassic, even though taxonomic diversity had rebounded in a tenth of that time.

The pace and timing of recovery also differed based on clade and mode of life. Seafloor communities maintained comparatively low diversity until the end of the Early Triassic, approximately 4-million years after the extinction event. Epifaunal benthos took longer to recover than infaunal benthos. This slow recovery stands in remarkable contrast with the quick recovery seen in nektonic organisms such as ammonoids, which exceeded pre-extinction diversities already two million years after the crisis, and conodonts, which diversified considerably over the first two million years of the Early Triassic.

Recent work suggests that the pace of recovery was intrinsically driven by the intensity of interspecific competition, which in turn drives rates of niche differentiation and speciation. That recovery was slow in the Early Triassic can be explained by low levels of biological competition due to the paucity of taxonomic diversity, and that biotic recovery explosively accelerated in the Anisian can be explained by niche crowding, a phenomenon that would have drastically increased competition, becoming prevalent by the Anisian. Biodiversity rise thus behaved as a positive feedback loop enhancing itself as it took off in the Spathian and Anisian. Accordingly, low levels of interspecific competition in seafloor communities that are dominated by primary consumers correspond to slow rates of diversification and high levels of interspecific competition among nektonic secondary and tertiary consumers to high diversification rates. Other explanations state that life was delayed in its recovery because grim conditions returned periodically over the course of the Early Triassic, causing further extinction events, such as the Smithian-Spathian boundary extinction. Continual episodes of extremely hot climatic conditions during the Early Triassic have been held responsible for the delayed recovery of oceanic life, in particular skeletonized taxa that are most vulnerable to high carbon dioxide concentrations. The relative delay in the recovery of benthic organisms has been attributed to widespread anoxia, but high abundances of benthic species contradict this explanation. A 2019 study attributed the dissimilarity of recovery times between different ecological communities to differences in local environmental stress during the biotic recovery interval, with regions experiencing persistent environmental stress post-extinction recovering more slowly, supporting the view that recurrent environmental calamities were culpable for retarded biotic recovery. Recurrent Early Triassic environmental stresses also acted as a ceiling limiting the maximum ecological complexity of marine ecosystems until the Spathian. Recovery biotas appear to have been ecologically uneven and unstable into the Anisian, making them vulnerable to environmental stresses.

Whereas most marine communities were fully recovered by the Middle Triassic, global marine diversity reached pre-extinction values no earlier than the Middle Jurassic, approximately 75-million years after the extinction event.

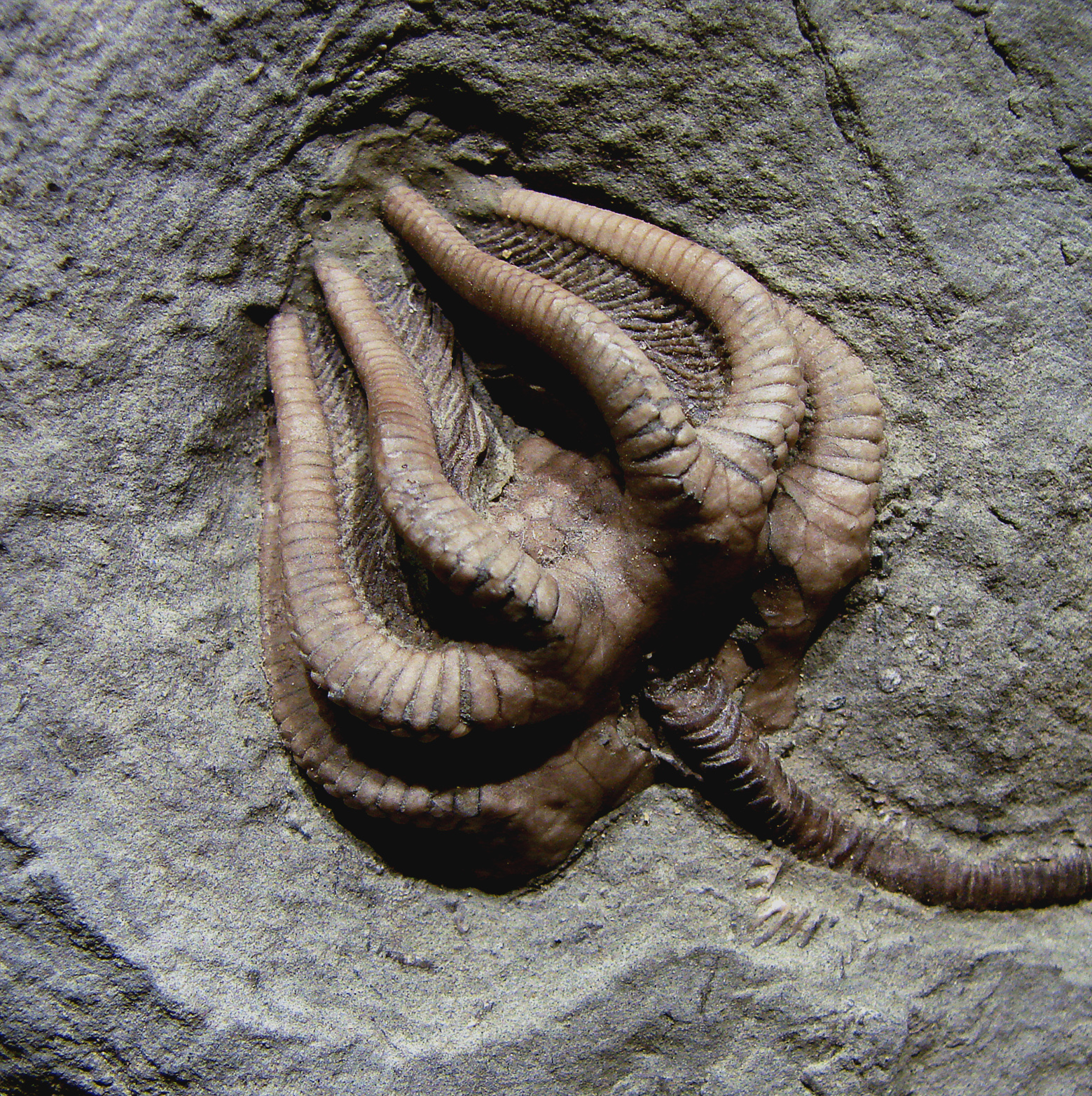
Sessile filter feeders like this Carboniferous crinoid, the mushroom crinoid (Agaricocrinus americanus), were significantly less abundant after the P–Tr extinction.

Before the extinction, about two-thirds of marine animals were sessile and attached to the seafloor. During the Mesozoic, only about half of the marine animals were sessile, while the rest were free-living. Analysis of marine fossils from the period indicated a decrease in the abundance of sessile epifaunal suspension feeders such as brachiopods and sea lilies and an increase in more complex mobile species such as snails, sea urchins and crabs. Before the Permian mass extinction event, both complex and simple marine ecosystems were equally common. After the recovery from the mass extinction, the complex communities outnumbered the simple communities by nearly three to one, and the increase in predation pressure and durophagy led to the Mesozoic Marine Revolution.

Marine vertebrates recovered relatively quickly, exhibiting complex predator-prey interactions, with vertebrates at the top of the food web, as evidenced by coprolites dating to 5 million years after the PTME. Apex predatory marine reptiles, absent from the oceans before the PTME, established themselves as a new trophic level. Post-PTME hybodonts exhibited extremely rapid tooth replacement. Ichthyopterygians appear to have ballooned in size extremely rapidly following the PTME.

Bivalves rapidly recolonized many marine environments in the wake of the catastrophe. Bivalves were fairly rare before the P–Tr extinction but became numerous and diverse in the Triassic, taking over niches that were filled primarily by brachiopods before the mass extinction event. Bivalves were once thought to have outcompeted brachiopods, but this outdated hypothesis about the brachiopod-bivalve transition has been disproven by Bayesian analysis. The success of bivalves in the aftermath of the extinction event may have been a function of them possessing greater resilience to environmental stress compared to the brachiopods that they coexisted with, whilst other studies have emphasised the greater niche breadth of the former. The rise of bivalves to taxonomic and ecological dominance over brachiopods was not synchronous, however, and brachiopods retained an outsized ecological dominance into the Middle Triassic even as bivalves eclipsed them in taxonomic diversity. Some researchers think the brachiopod-bivalve transition was attributable not only to the end-Permian extinction but also the ecological restructuring that began as a result of the Capitanian extinction. Infaunal habits in bivalves became more common after the PTME.

Linguliform brachiopods were commonplace immediately after the extinction event, with their abundance essentially unaffected by the crisis. Adaptations for oxygen-poor and warm environments, such as increased lophophoral cavity surface, shell width/length ratio, and shell miniaturization, are observed in post-extinction linguliforms. The surviving brachiopod fauna was very low in diversity and exhibited no provincialism whatsoever. Brachiopods during the post-extinction survival interval were predominantly cosmopolitan and generalist taxa. Brachiopods began their recovery around 250.1 ± 0.3 Ma, as marked by the appearance of the genus Meishanorhynchia, believed to be the first of the progenitor brachiopods that evolved after the mass extinction. Major brachiopod rediversification only began in the late Spathian and Anisian in conjunction with the decline of widespread anoxia and extreme heat and the expansion of more habitable climatic zones. Brachiopod taxa during the Anisian recovery interval were only phylogenetically related to Late Permian brachiopods at a familial taxonomic level or higher; the ecology of brachiopods had radically changed from before in the mass extinction's aftermath.

Ostracods were extremely rare during the basal-most Early Triassic. Taxa associated with microbialites were disproportionately represented among ostracod survivors. Ostracod recovery began in the Spathian. Despite high taxonomic turnover, the ecological life modes of Early Triassic ostracods remained rather similar to those of pre-PTME ostracods.

Xiphosurans survived the extinction and played important roles as predators in the immediate aftermath of the extinction, as evidenced by the limulid Guangyuanolimulus that existed immediately after the PTME's main extinction pulse.

Bryozoans in the Early Triassic were restricted to the Boreal realm. They were also not diverse, represented mainly by members of Trepostomatida. During the Middle Triassic, there was a rise in bryozoan diversity, which peaked in the Carnian. However, bryozoans took until the Late Cretaceous to recover their full diversity.

Crinoids ("sea lilies") suffered a selective extinction, resulting in a decrease in the variety of their forms. Though clade analyses suggest the beginning of their recovery to have taken place in the Induan, the recovery of their diversity as measured by fossil evidence was far less rapid, showing up in the late Ladinian. Their adaptive radiation after the extinction event resulted in forms possessing flexible arms becoming widespread; motility, predominantly a response to predation pressure, also became far more prevalent. Though their taxonomic diversity remained relatively low, crinoids regained much of their ecological dominance by the Middle Triassic epoch. Stem-group echinoids survived the PTME. The survival of miocidarid echinoids such as Eotiaris is likely attributable to their ability to thrive in a wide range of environmental conditions.

Conodonts saw a rapid recovery during the Induan, with anchignathodontids experiencing a diversity peak in the earliest Induan. Gondolellids diversified at the end of the Griesbachian; this diversity spike was most responsible for the overall conodont diversity peak in the Smithian. Segminiplanate conodonts again experienced a brief period of domination in the early Spathian, probably related to a transient oxygenation of deep waters. Neospathodid conodonts survived the crisis but underwent proteromorphosis. Conodont rediversification was primarily limited by functional constraints in the Griesbachian, and later by a combination of dispersal and niche space constraints in the Dienerian and Smithian.

In the aftermath of the PTME, disaster taxa of benthic foraminifera filled many of their vacant niches. The recovery of benthic foraminifera was very slow and frequently interrupted until the Spathian. In the Tethys, foraminiferal communities remained low in diversity into the Middle Triassic, with the exception of a notable Ladinian fauna from the Catalonian Basin. Foraminifer taxa after the PTME had a mean body size only 15% large as the mean body size of foraminifer taxa before the extinction event.

Microbial reefs were common across shallow seas for a short time during the earliest Triassic, predominating in low latitudes while being rarer in higher latitudes, occurring both in anoxic and oxic waters. Polybessurus-like microfossils often dominated these earliest Triassic microbialites. Microbial-metazoan reefs appeared very early in the Early Triassic; and they dominated many surviving communities across the recovery from the mass extinction. Microbialite deposits appear to have declined in the early Griesbachian synchronously with a significant sea level drop that occurred then. Metazoan-built reefs reemerged during the Olenekian, mainly being composed of sponge biostrome and bivalve buildups. Keratinous sponges were particularly noteworthy in their integral importance to Early Triassic microbial-metazoan reef communities, and they helped to create stability in heavily damaged ecosystems during early phases of biotic recovery. "Tubiphytes"-dominated reefs appeared at the end of the Olenekian, representing the earliest platform-margin reefs of the Triassic, though they did not become abundant until the late Anisian, when reefs' species richness increased. The first scleractinian corals also appear in the late Anisian, although they would not become the dominant reef builders until the end of the Triassic period. Bryozoans, after sponges, were the most numerous organisms in Tethyan reefs during the Anisian. Metazoan reefs became common again during the Anisian because the oceans cooled down then from their overheated state during the Early Triassic. Biodiversity amongst metazoan reefs did not recover until well into the Anisian, millions of years after non-reef ecosystems recovered their diversity. Microbially induced sedimentary structures (MISS) from the earliest Triassic have been found to be associated with abundant opportunistic bivalves and vertical burrows, and it is likely that post-extinction microbial mats played a vital, indispensable role in the survival and recovery of various bioturbating organisms. The microbialite refuge hypothesis has been criticised as reflecting a taphonomic bias due to the greater preservation potential of microbialite deposits, however, rather than a genuine phenomenon.

Ichnoconoses show that marine ecosystems recovered to pre-extinction levels of ecological complexity by the late Olenekian. Anisian ichnoconoses show slightly lower diversity than Spathian ichnoconoses, although this was likely a taphonomic consequence of increased and deeper bioturbation erasing evidence of shallower bioturbation.

Ichnological evidence suggests that recovery and recolonization of marine environments may have occurred through outward dispersal from refugia that experienced relatively mild perturbations and whose local biota were less strongly affected by the mass extinction than those in the rest of the world's oceans. Although complex bioturbation patterns were rare in the Early Triassic, likely reflecting the inhospitability of many shallow water environments in the extinction's wake, complex ecosystem engineering managed to persist locally in some places, and may have spread from there after harsh conditions across the global ocean were ameliorated over time. Wave-dominated shoreface settings (WDSS) are believed to have served as refugium environments because they appear to have been unusually diverse in the mass extinction's aftermath.

=== Terrestrial plants ===
The proto-recovery of terrestrial floras took place from a few tens of thousands of years after the end-Permian extinction to around 350,000 years after it, with the exact timeline varying by region. Furthermore, severe extinction pulses continued to occur after the Permian-Triassic boundary, causing additional floral turnovers. Gymnosperms recovered within a few thousand years after the Permian-Triassic boundary, but around 500,000 years after it, the dominant gymnosperm genera were replaced by lycophytes – extant lycophytes are recolonizers of disturbed areas – during an extinction pulse at the Griesbachian-Dienerian boundary. The particular post-extinction dominance of lycophytes, which were well adapted for coastal environments, can be explained in part by global marine transgressions during the Early Triassic. The worldwide recovery of gymnosperm forests took approximately 4–5 million years. However, this trend of prolonged lycophyte dominance during the Early Triassic was not universal, as evidenced by the much more rapid recovery of gymnosperms in certain regions, and floral recovery likely did not follow a congruent, globally universal trend but instead varied by region according to local environmental conditions.

In East Greenland, lycophytes replaced gymnosperms as the dominant plants. Later, other groups of gymnosperms again became dominant but again suffered major die-offs. These cyclical shifts in flora occurred a few times during the extinction period and afterward. These fluctuations in the dominant flora between woody and herbaceous taxa indicate chronic environmental stress, resulting in the loss of most large woodland plant species. The successions and extinctions of plant communities do not coincide with the shift in δ^{13}C values; they occurred many years later.

In what is now the Barents Sea of the coast of Norway, the post-extinction flora is dominated by pteridophytes and lycopods, which were suited for primary succession and recolonization of devastated areas, although gymnosperms made a rapid recovery, with the lycopod dominated flora not persisting across most of the Early Triassic as postulated in other regions.

In Europe and North China, the recovery interval was dominated by the lycopsid Pleuromeia, an opportunistic pioneer plant that filled ecological vacancies until other plants were able to expand from refugia and recolonize the land. Conifers became common by the early Anisian, while pteridosperms and cycadophytes only fully recovered by the late Anisian.

During the survival phase in the immediate aftermath of the terrestrial extinction, from the latest Changhsingian to the Griesbachian, South China was dominated by opportunistic lycophytes. Low-lying herbaceous vegetation dominated by the isoetalean Tomiostrobus was ubiquitous following the collapse of the gigantopterid-dominated forests of before. In contrast to the highly biodiverse gigantopterid rainforests, the post-extinction landscape of South China was near-barren and far less diverse. Plant survivors of the PTME in South China experienced extremely high rates of mutagenesis induced by heavy metal poisoning. From the late Griesbachian to the Smithian, conifers and ferns began to rediversify. After the Smithian, the opportunistic lycophyte flora declined, as the newly radiating conifer and fern species permanently replaced them as the dominant components of South China's flora.

On the Tibetan plateau, the early Dienerian Endosporites papillatus–Pinuspollenites thoracatus assemblages closely resemble late Changhsingian Tibetan floras, suggesting that the widespread, dominant latest Permian flora repopulated easily after the PTME. However, in the late Dienerian, a major shift towards assemblages dominated by cavate trilete spores occurred, heralding widespread deforestation and a rapid transition to hotter, more humid conditions. Quillworts and spike mosses dominated Tibetan flora for about a million years after this shift.

In Pakistan, on the northern margin of Gondwana, the flora was rich in lycopods associated with conifers and pteridosperms. Floral turnovers continued due to repeated perturbations from recurrent volcanic activity until terrestrial ecosystems stabilized around 2.1 Myr after the PTME.

In southwestern Gondwana, the post-extinction flora was dominated by bennettitaleans and cycads, with members of Peltaspermales, Ginkgoales, and Umkomasiales being less common constituents. Around the Induan-Olenekian boundary, as paleocommunities recovered, a new Dicroidium flora was established, in which Umkomasiales continued to be prominent and in which Equisetales and Cycadales were subordinate forms. The Dicroidium flora further diversified in the Anisian to its peak, wherein Umkomasiales and Ginkgoales constituted most of the tree canopy and Peltaspermales, Petriellales, Cycadales, Umkomasiales, Gnetales, Equisetales, and Dipteridaceae dominated the undergrowth.

==== Coal gap ====
No coal deposits are known from the Early Triassic, and those in the Middle Triassic are thin and low-grade. This "coal gap" has been explained in many ways. It has been suggested that new, more aggressive fungi, insects, and vertebrates evolved and killed vast numbers of trees. These decomposers themselves suffered severe species losses during the extinction and are not considered a likely cause of the coal gap. It could simply be that all coal-forming plants were rendered extinct by the P–Tr extinction, and that it took 10 million years for a new suite of plants to adapt to the moist, acidic conditions of peat bogs. Abiotic factors (factors not caused by organisms), such as decreased rainfall or increased input of clastic sediments, may also be to blame.

On the other hand, the lack of coal may reflect the scarcity of all known sediments from the Early Triassic. Coal-producing ecosystems, rather than disappearing, may have moved to areas where we have no sedimentary record for the Early Triassic. For example, in eastern Australia, a cold climate had been the norm for a long period, with a peat mire ecosystem adapted to these conditions. Approximately 95% of these peat-producing plants went locally extinct at the P–Tr boundary; coal deposits in Australia and Antarctica disappear well before the P–Tr boundary.

=== Terrestrial vertebrates ===
Land vertebrates took an unusually long time to recover from the P–Tr extinction, taking until the Middle Triassic; paleontologist Michael Benton estimated the recovery was not complete until 30 million years after the extinction, i.e. not until the Late Triassic, when the first dinosaurs had risen from bipedal archosaurian ancestors and the first mammals from small cynodont ancestors. A tetrapod gap may have existed from the Induan until the early Spathian between ~30 °N and ~ 40 °S due to extreme heat making these low latitudes uninhabitable for these animals. During the hottest phases of this interval, the gap would have spanned an even greater latitudinal range. Some temnospondyls were nevertheless able to inhabit this otherwise inhospitable tropical zone. East-central Pangaea, with its relatively wet climate, served as a dispersal corridor for PTME survivors during their Early Triassic recolonization of the supercontinent. In North China, tetrapod body and ichnofossils are extremely rare in Induan facies, but become more abundant in the Olenekian and Anisian, showing a biotic recovery of tetrapods synchronous with the decreasing aridity during the Olenekian and Anisian. In Russia, even after 15 Myr of recovery, during which ecosystems were rebuilt and remodeled, many terrestrial vertebrate guilds were absent, including small insectivores, small piscivores, large herbivores, and apex predators. Lacustrine ecosystems took about 10 Myr to recover. Coprolitic evidence indicates that freshwater food webs had recovered by the early Ladinian, with a lacustrine coprolite assemblage from the Ordos Basin of China providing evidence of a trophically multileveled ecosystem containing at least six different trophic levels. Vertebrate predators filled the highest trophic levels. Geochemical evidence has further bolstered this finding. Overall, terrestrial faunas after the extinction event tended to be more variable and heterogeneous across space than those of the Late Permian, which exhibited less provincialism, being much more geographically homogeneous.

==== Synapsids ====
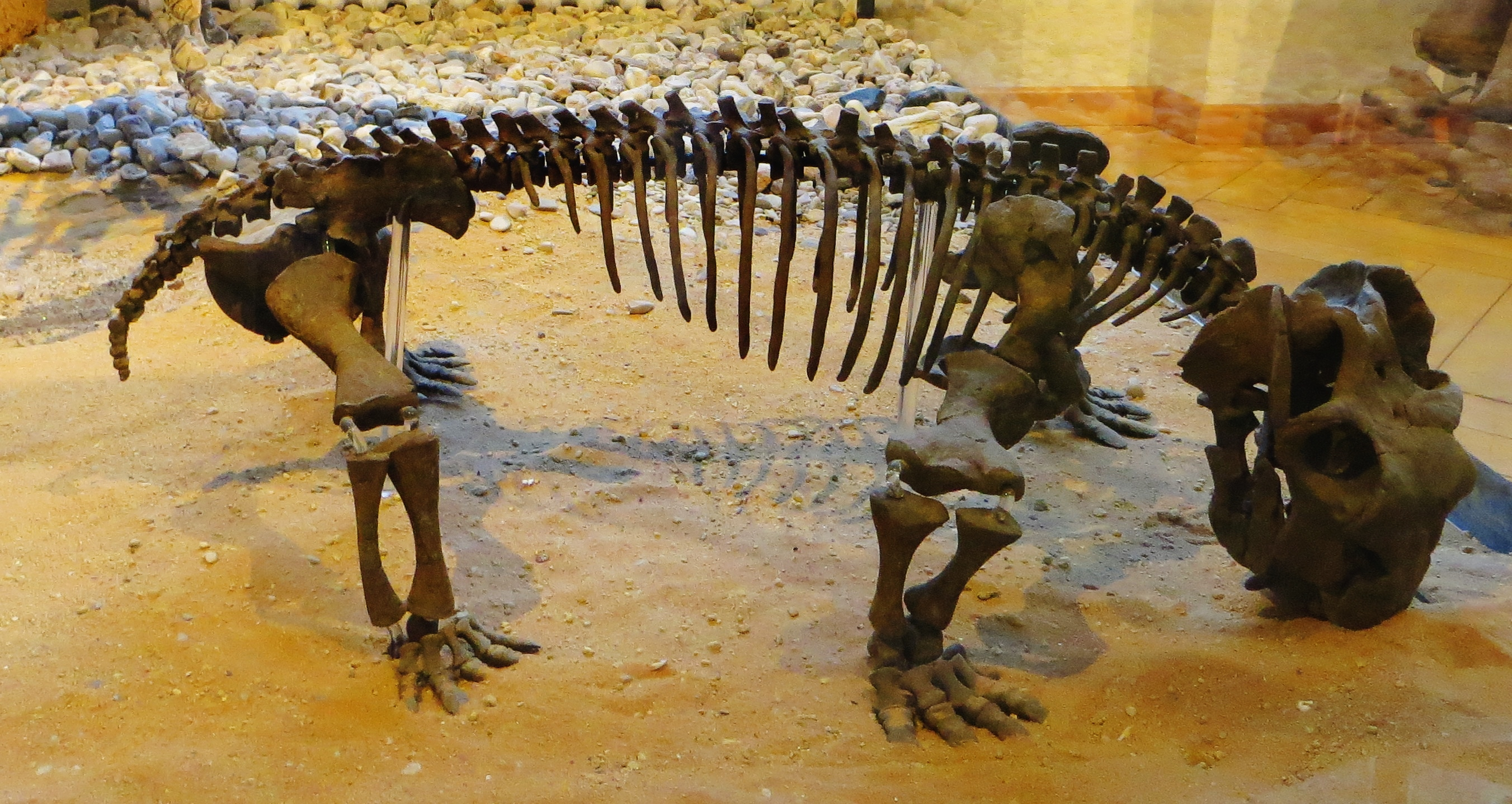
Lystrosaurus was by far the most abundant early Triassic land vertebrate.

Lystrosaurus, a pig-sized herbivorous dicynodont therapsid, constituted as much as 90% of some earliest Triassic land vertebrate fauna, although some recent evidence has called into question its status as a post-PTME disaster taxon. The dicynodont genus is often used as a biostratigraphic marker for the PTME. The evolutionary success of Lystrosaurus in the aftermath of the PTME is believed to be attributable to the dicynodont taxon's grouping behaviour and tolerance for extreme and highly variable climatic conditions. Other likely factors behind the success of Lystrosaurus included extremely fast growth rate exhibited by the dicynodont genus, along with its early onset of sexual maturity. Antarctica may have served as a refuge for dicynodonts during the PTME from which surviving dicynodonts spread out of in its aftermath. Ichnological evidence from the earliest Triassic of the Karoo Basin shows dicynodonts were abundant in the immediate aftermath of the biotic crisis. Smaller carnivorous cynodont therapsids also survived, a group that included the ancestors of mammals. As with dicynodonts, selective pressures favoured endothermic epicynodonts. Therocephalians likewise survived; burrowing may have been a key adaptation that helped them make it through the PTME. In the Karoo region of southern Africa, the therocephalians Tetracynodon, Moschorhinus and Promoschorhynchus (the latter based on specimens originally assigned to Ictidosuchoides) survived, but do not appear to have been abundant in the Triassic. Early Triassic therocephalians were mostly survivors of the PTME rather than newly evolved taxa that originated during the evolutionary radiation in its aftermath. Both therocephalians and cynodonts, known collectively as eutheriodonts, decreased in body size from the Late Permian to the Early Triassic. This decrease in body size has been interpreted as an example of the Lilliput effect.

==== Sauropsids ====
Archosaurs (which included the ancestors of dinosaurs and crocodilians) were initially rarer than therapsids, but they began to displace therapsids in the mid-Triassic. Olenekian tooth fossil assemblages from the Karoo Basin indicate that archosauromorphs were already highly diverse by this time, though not very ecologically specialised. In the mid to late Triassic, the dinosaurs evolved from one group of archosaurs, and went on to dominate terrestrial ecosystems during the Jurassic and Cretaceous. This "Triassic Takeover" may have contributed to the evolution of mammals by forcing the surviving therapsids and their mammaliform successors to live as small, mainly nocturnal insectivores; nocturnal life probably forced at least the mammaliforms to develop fur, better hearing and higher metabolic rates, while losing part of the differential color-sensitive retinal receptors reptilians and birds preserved. Archosaurs also experienced an increase in metabolic rates over time during the Early Triassic. The archosaur dominance would end again due to the Cretaceous–Paleogene extinction event, after which both birds (only extant dinosaurs) and mammals (only extant synapsids) would diversify and share the world.

==== Temnospondyls ====
Temnospondyl amphibians made a quick recovery; the appearance of so many temnospondyl clades in the fossil record suggests they may have been ideally suited to recolonising decimated ecosystems as pioneer species. During the Induan, tupilakosaurids in particular thrived as disaster taxa, including Tupilakosaurus itself, though they gave way to other temnospondyls as ecosystems recovered. Temnospondyls were reduced in size during the Induan, but their body size rebounded to pre-PTME levels during the Olenekian. Mastodonsaurus and trematosaurians were the main aquatic and semiaquatic predators during most of the Triassic, some preying on tetrapods and others on fish.

==== Dipnoans ====
Many diminutive ceratodontiform lungfishes radiated in the PTME's aftermath, possibly representing an example of the Lilliput effect in vertebrates.

=== Terrestrial invertebrates ===
Most fossil insect groups found after the Permian–Triassic boundary differ significantly from those before: Of Paleozoic insect groups, only the Glosselytrodea, Miomoptera, and Protorthoptera have been discovered in deposits from after the extinction. The caloneurodeans, paleodictyopteroids, protelytropterans, and protodonates became extinct by the end of the Permian. Though Triassic insects are very different from those of the Permian, a gap in the insect fossil record spans approximately 15 million years from the late Permian to the early Triassic. In well-documented Late Triassic deposits, fossils overwhelmingly consist of modern insect groups.

Microbially induced sedimentary structures (MISS) dominated North Chinese terrestrial fossil assemblages in the Early Triassic. In Arctic Canada as well, MISS became a common occurrence following the Permian-Triassic extinction. The prevalence of MISS in many Early Triassic rocks shows that microbial mats were an important feature of post-extinction ecosystems that were denuded of bioturbators that would have otherwise prevented their widespread occurrence. The disappearance of MISS later in the Early Triassic likely indicated a greater recovery of terrestrial ecosystems and specifically a return of prevalent bioturbation.

== Hypotheses about cause ==
Explaining an event from 250 million years ago is inherently difficult, with much of the evidence on land eroded or deeply buried, while the spreading seafloor is completely recycled over 200 million years, leaving no useful indications beneath the ocean.

Yet scientists have gathered substantial evidence for the causes, and several mechanisms have been proposed. The proposals include both catastrophic and gradual processes (similar to those theorized for the Cretaceous–Paleogene extinction event, but with much less current consensus).

- The catastrophic group includes one or more large bolide impact events, increased volcanism, and sudden release of methane from the seafloor, either due to dissociation of methane hydrate deposits or metabolism of organic carbon deposits by methanogenic microbes.
- The gradual group includes sea level change, increasing hypoxia, and increasing aridity.

Any hypothesis about the cause must explain the selectivity of the event, which affected organisms with calcium carbonate skeletons most severely; the long period (4 to 6 million years) before recovery started, and the minimal extent of biological mineralization (despite inorganic carbonates being deposited) once the recovery began.

=== Volcanism ===
==== Siberian Traps ====
The flood basalt eruptions that produced the large igneous province of the Siberian Traps were among the largest known volcanic events, extruding lava over 2,000,000 square kilometres (770,000 sq mi), roughly the size of Saudi Arabia, producing a catastrophic impact. The date of the Siberian Traps eruptions matches well with the extinction event. A study of the Norilsk and Maymecha-Kotuy regions of the northern Siberian platform indicates that volcanic activity occurred during a few enormous pulses of magma, as opposed to more regular flows.

The Siberian Traps caused one of the most rapid rises of atmospheric carbon dioxide levels in the geologic record, with the rate of carbon dioxide emissions estimated as five times faster than during the preceding catastrophic Capitanian mass extinction during the eruption of the Emeishan Traps. Overwhelming inorganic carbon sinks, carbon dioxide levels might have jumped from between 500 and 4,000 ppm before the extinction to around 8,000 ppm after, according to one estimate. Another study estimated pre-extinction carbon dioxide levels at 400 ppm, which then rose to 2,500 ppm, with 3,900 to 12,000 gigatonnes of carbon added to the ocean-atmosphere system. Extreme temperature rise would have followed, though some evidence suggests a lag of 12,000 to 128,000 years between the rise in volcanic carbon dioxide emissions and global warming. Although this discrepancy could be also attributed to an incorrect biochronology. During the latest Permian before the extinction, global average surface temperatures were about 18.2 °C, which shot up to as much as 35 °C, this hyperthermal condition lasting as long as 500,000 years. Air temperatures at Gondwana's high southern latitudes experienced a warming of ~10–14 °C. According to oxygen isotope shifts from conodont apatite in South China, low latitude surface water temperatures surged about 8 °C. In present-day Iran, tropical sea surface temperatures were between 27 and 33 °C during the Changhsingian but jumped to over 35 °C during the PTME. The increased mean state temperatures also brought stronger El Nino events, heightening short-term climate variability.

These extremely high atmospheric carbon dioxide concentrations persisted over a long period. The position and alignment of Pangaea at the time made the inorganic carbon cycle very inefficient at burying carbon. In a 2020 paper, scientists reconstructed the mechanisms that led to the extinction event in a biogeochemical model, showed the consequences of the greenhouse effect on the marine environment, and concluded that the mass extinction can be traced back to volcanic CO_{2} emissions. Evidence also points to volcanic combustion of underground fossil fuel deposits, based on paired coronene-mercury spikes coinciding with geographically widespread mercury anomalies and the rise in isotopically light carbon. Te/Th values increase twentyfold over the PTME, further indicating it was concomitant with extreme volcanism. A major volcanogenic influx of isotopically light zinc from the Siberian Traps has also been recorded, further confirming that volcanism was contemporary with the PTME.

The Siberian Traps eruptions had unusual features that made them even more dangerous. The Siberian lithosphere is rich in halogens, which are extremely destructive to the ozone layer, and evidence from subcontinental lithospheric xenoliths indicates that as much as 70% of their halogen content was released into the atmosphere. Around 18 teratonnes of hydrochloric acid were emitted, along with sulphur-rich volatiles that caused dust clouds and acid aerosols, which would have blocked out sunlight and disrupted photosynthesis on land and in the photic zone of the ocean, causing food chains to collapse. These volcanic outbursts of sulphur also induced brief but severe global cooling punctuating the broader trend of rapid global warming, with glacio-eustatic sea level fall. However, the briefness of these cold events makes them unlikely to have been a significant kill mechanism.

The eruptions may also have caused acid rain as the aerosols washed out of the atmosphere. That may have killed land plants and mollusks and planktonic organisms with calcium carbonate shells. Pure flood basalts produce fluid, low-viscosity lava and do not hurl debris into the atmosphere. It appears, however, that 20% of the output of the Siberian Traps eruptions was pyroclastic ash thrown high into the atmosphere, increasing the short-term cooling effect. When this had washed out of the atmosphere, the excess carbon dioxide would have remained and global warming would have proceeded unchecked.

Burning of hydrocarbon deposits may have exacerbated the extinction. The Siberian Traps are underlain by thick sequences of Early-Mid Paleozoic-aged carbonate and evaporite deposits, as well as Carboniferous-Permian-aged coal-bearing clastic rocks. When heated, such as by igneous intrusions, these rocks may emit large amounts of greenhouse and toxic gases. The unique setting of the Siberian Traps over these deposits is likely the reason for the severity of the extinction. The basalt lava erupted or intruded into carbonate rocks and sediments in the process of forming large coal beds, which would have emitted large amounts of carbon dioxide, leading to stronger global warming after the dust and aerosols settled. The change of the eruptions from flood basalt to sill-dominated emplacement, liberating even more trapped hydrocarbon deposits, coincides with the main onset of the extinction and is linked to a major negative δ^{13}C excursion. The intermediate temperature of the Siberian Traps magmas optimised the extremely voluminous release of CO_{2} by way of heating of evaporites and carbonates.

Venting of coal-derived methane was accompanied by explosive combustion of coal and discharge of coal-fly ash. A 2011 study led by Stephen E. Grasby reported evidence that volcanism caused massive coal beds to ignite, possibly releasing more than 3 trillion tons of carbon. They found ash deposits in deep rock layers near what is now the Buchanan Lake Formation: "coal ash dispersed by the explosive Siberian Trap eruption would be expected to have an associated release of toxic elements in impacted water bodies where fly ash slurries developed. ... Mafic megascale eruptions are long-lived events that would allow significant build-up of global ash clouds." Grasby said, "In addition to these volcanoes causing fires through coal, the ash it spewed was highly toxic and was released in the land and water, potentially contributing to the worst extinction event in Earth history." However, some researchers propose that these supposed fly ashes were actually the result of wildfires not related to massive coal combustion by intrusive magmatism. A 2013 study led by Q.Y. Yang reported that the total amounts of important volatiles emitted from the Siberian Traps consisted of 8.5 × 10^{7} Tg CO_{2}, 4.4 × 10^{6} Tg CO, 7.0 × 10^{6} Tg H_{2}S, and 6.8 × 10^{7} Tg SO_{2}.

The sill-dominated emplacement of the Siberian Traps prolonged their warming effects, whereas extrusive volcanism generates an abundance of subaerial basalts that efficiently sequester carbon dioxide via the silicate weathering process; underground sills cannot sequester atmospheric carbon dioxide or mitigate global warming. Additionally, enhanced reverse weathering and depletion of siliceous carbon sinks enabled extreme warmth to persist for much longer than expected if the excess carbon dioxide was sequestered by silicate rock.

The reduction in marine primary productivity diminished emissions of dimethyl sulphate and dimethylsulphoniopropionate, enhancing warming. Also, the decline in biological silicate deposition resulting from the mass extinction of siliceous organisms acted as a positive feedback loop wherein mass death of marine life exacerbated and prolonged extreme hothouse conditions by depleting yet another siliceous carbon sink.

Mercury anomalies corresponding to the time of Siberian Traps activity have been found in many geographically disparate sites, indicating that these volcanic eruptions released significant quantities of toxic mercury into the atmosphere and ocean, causing even larger terrestrial and marine die-offs. Although initial mercury loading on land at the start of the PTME is linked to enhanced wildfires, the 500 kyr surge in mercury following this initial spike has been directly linked to volcanism. A series of surges raised terrestrial and marine environmental mercury concentrations by orders of magnitude above normal background levels and caused mercury poisoning over periods of a thousand years each. Mutagenesis in surviving plants during and after the PTME coeval with mercury loading and that of other heavy metals confirms volcanically induced heavy metal toxicity. Increased bioproductivity may have sequestered mercury and partly mitigated poisoning. Immense volumes of nickel aerosols and cobalt and arsenic emissions, were also released, further contributing to metal poisoning.

The devastation wrought by the Siberian Traps did not end following the Permian-Triassic boundary. Carbon isotope fluctuations suggest that massive Siberian Traps activity recurred multiple times during the Early Triassic, a finding corroborated by mercury spikes, causing further extinction events during the epoch.

==== Choiyoi Silicic Large Igneous Province ====
A second flood basalt event that produced the Choiyoi Silicic Large Igneous Province in southwestern Gondwana between around 286 Ma and 247 Ma has also been suggested as a significant additional extinction mechanism. At 1,300,000 cubic kilometres in volume and 1,680,000 square kilometres in area, this event was 40% the size of the Siberian Traps. Specifically, this flood basalt has been implicated in the regional demise of the Gondwanan Glossopteris flora.

==== Indochina–South China subduction-zone volcanic arc ====
Mercury anomalies preceding the end-Permian extinction have been discovered in what was then the boundary between the South China craton and the Indochinese plate, a subduction zone with a volcanic arc. Hafnium isotopes from syndepositional magmatic zircons found in ash beds created by this volcanic pulse confirm its origin in subduction-zone volcanism rather than large igneous province activity. The enrichment of copper samples from these deposits in isotopically light copper provides additional confirmation. This volcanism has been speculated to have caused local biotic stress among radiolarians, sponges, and brachiopods over the 60,000 years preceding the end-Permian marine extinction, as well as an ammonoid crisis with decreased morphological complexity and size and increased rate of turnover beginning in the lower C. yini biozone, around 200,000 years before the extinction.

=== Methane clathrate gasification ===
Methane clathrates, also known as methane hydrates, consist of molecules of methane trapped in the crystal lattice of ice. This methane, produced by methanogen microbes, has a ^{13}C / ^{12}C isotope ratio about 6% below normal (δ^{13}C −6.0%). At the right combination of pressure and temperature, clathrates form near the surface of permafrost and in large quantities on continental shelves and nearby seabed at water depths of at least 300 m (980 ft), buried in sediments up to 2,000 m (6,600 ft) below the sea floor.

Massive release of methane from these clathrates may have contributed to the PTME, as scientists have found worldwide evidence of a swift decrease of about 1% in the ^{13}C / ^{12}C ratio in carbonate rocks from the end-Permian. This is the first, largest, and fastest of a series of excursions (decreases and increases) in the ratio, until it abruptly stabilised in the middle Triassic, followed soon afterwards by the recovery of calcifying shelled sealife. The seabed probably contained methane hydrate deposits, and the lava caused the deposits to dissociate, releasing vast quantities of methane. A large release of methane could cause significant global warming, since methane is a very potent greenhouse gas. Strong evidence suggests the global temperatures increased by about 6 °C (10.8 °F) near the equator and therefore by more at higher latitudes: a sharp decrease in oxygen isotope ratios (^{18}O / ^{16}O); the extinction of Glossopteris flora (Glossopteris and plants that grew in the same areas), which needed a cold climate, with its replacement by floras typical of lower paleolatitudes. It was also suggested that a large-scale release of methane and other greenhouse gases from the ocean into the atmosphere was connected to the anoxic events and euxinic (sulfidic) events at the time, with the exact mechanism compared to the 1986 Lake Nyos disaster.

The clathrate hypothesis seemed the only proposed mechanism sufficient to cause a global 1% reduction in the ^{13}C / ^{12}C ratio . While a variety of factors may have contributed to the ratio drop, a 2002 review found most of them insufficient to account for the observed amount:

- Gases from volcanic eruptions have a ^{13}C / ^{12}C ratio about 0.5 to 0.8% below standard (δ^{13}C −0.5 to −0.8%), but a 1995 assessment concluded that the observed 1.0% worldwide reduction would have required eruptions massively larger than any found. (However, this analysis addressed only CO_{2} produced by the magma itself, not from interactions with carbon bearing sediments, as described below.)
- A reduction in organic activity would extract ^{12}C more slowly from the environment and leave more of it to be incorporated into sediments, thus reducing the ^{13}C / ^{12}C ratio. Biochemical processes preferentially use the lighter isotopes since chemical reactions are ultimately driven by electromagnetic forces between atoms and lighter isotopes respond more quickly to these forces, but a study of a smaller drop of 0.3 to 0.4% in ^{13}C / ^{12}C (δ^{13}C −3 to −4 ‰) at the Paleocene-Eocene Thermal Maximum (PETM) concluded that even transferring all the organic carbon (in organisms, soils, and dissolved in the ocean) into sediments would be insufficient: Even such a large burial of material rich in ^{12}C would not have produced the 'smaller' drop in the ^{13}C / ^{12}C ratio of the rocks around the PETM.
- Buried sedimentary organic matter has a ^{13}C / ^{12}C ratio 2.0 to 2.5% below normal (δ^{13}C −2.0 to −2.5%). Theoretically, if the sea level fell sharply, shallow marine sediments would be exposed to oxidation. But 6,500–8,400 gigatonnes (1 gigatonne = 10^{12} kg) of organic carbon would have to be oxidized and returned to the ocean-atmosphere system within less than a few hundred thousand years to reduce the ^{13}C / ^{12}C ratio by 1.0%, which is not thought to be a realistic possibility. Moreover, sea levels were rising rather than falling at the time of the extinction.
- Rather than a sudden decline in sea level, intermittent periods of ocean-bottom hyperoxia and anoxia (high-oxygen and low- or zero-oxygen conditions) may have caused the ^{13}C / ^{12}C ratio fluctuations in the Early Triassic; and global anoxia may have been responsible for the end-Permian blip. The continents of the end-Permian and early Triassic were more clustered in the tropics than they are now, and large tropical rivers would have dumped sediment into smaller, partially enclosed ocean basins at low latitudes. Such conditions favor oxic and anoxic episodes; oxic/anoxic conditions would result in a rapid release/burial, respectively, of large amounts of organic carbon, which has a low ^{13}C / ^{12}C ratio because biochemical processes use the lighter isotopes more. That or another organic-based reason may have been responsible for both that and a late Proterozoic/Cambrian pattern of fluctuating ^{13}C / ^{12}C ratios.

However, the clathrate hypothesis has also been criticized. Carbon-cycle models that account for the roasting of carbonate sediments by volcanism confirm that this process would have had a sufficient effect to produce the observed reduction. Also, the pattern of isotope shifts expected to result from a massive release of methane does not match the patterns seen throughout the Early Triassic. Not only would such a cause require the release of five times as much methane as postulated for the PETM, but would it also have to be reburied at an unrealistically high rate to account for the rapid increases in the ^{13}C / ^{12}C ratio (episodes of high positive δ^{13}C) throughout the early Triassic before it was released several times again. The latest research suggests that greenhouse gas release during the extinction event was dominated by volcanic carbon dioxide, and while methane release had to have contributed, isotopic signatures show that thermogenic methane released from the Siberian Traps had consistently played a larger role than methane from clathrates and any other biogenic sources such as wetlands during the event.

Adding to the evidence against methane clathrate release as the central driver of warming, the main rapid warming event is also associated with marine transgression rather than regression; the former would not normally have initiated methane release, which would have instead required a decrease in pressure, something that a retreat of shallow seas would generate. The configuration of the world's landmasses into one supercontinent would also mean that the global gas hydrate reservoir was lower than today, further damaging the case for methane clathrate dissolution as a major cause of the carbon cycle disruption.

=== Hypercapnia and acidification ===
Marine organisms are more sensitive to changes in CO_{2} (carbon dioxide) levels than terrestrial organisms for a variety of reasons. CO_{2} is 28 times more soluble in water than oxygen. Marine animals normally function with lower concentrations of CO_{2} in their bodies than land animals, as the removal of CO_{2} in air-breathing animals is impeded by the need for the gas to pass through the respiratory system's membranes (lungs' alveolus, tracheae, and the like), even when CO_{2} diffuses more easily than oxygen. In marine organisms, relatively modest but sustained increases in CO_{2} concentrations hamper the synthesis of proteins, reduce fertilization rates, and produce deformities in calcareous hard parts. Higher concentrations of CO_{2} also result in decreased activity levels in many active marine animals, hindering their ability to obtain food. An analysis of marine fossils from the Permian's final Changhsingian stage found that marine organisms with a low tolerance for hypercapnia (high concentration of carbon dioxide) had high extinction rates, and the most tolerant organisms had very slight losses. The most vulnerable marine organisms were those that produced calcareous hard parts (from calcium carbonate) and had low metabolic rates and weak respiratory systems, notably calcareous sponges, rugose and tabulate corals, calcite-depositing brachiopods, bryozoans, and echinoderms; about 81% of such genera became extinct. Close relatives without calcareous hard parts suffered only minor losses, such as sea anemones, from which modern corals evolved. Animals with high metabolic rates, well-developed respiratory systems, and non-calcareous hard parts had negligible losses except for conodonts, in which 33% of genera died out. This pattern is also consistent with what is known about the effects of hypoxia, a shortage but not total absence of oxygen. However, hypoxia cannot have been the only killing mechanism for marine organisms. Nearly all of the continental shelf waters would have had to become severely hypoxic to account for the magnitude of the extinction. Still, such a catastrophe would make it difficult to explain the highly selective pattern of the extinction. Mathematical models of the Late Permian and Early Triassic atmospheres show a significant but protracted decline in atmospheric oxygen levels, with no acceleration near the P–Tr boundary. Minimum atmospheric oxygen levels in the Early Triassic are never lower than present-day levels, so the decline in oxygen does not match the temporal pattern of the extinction.

In addition, an increase in CO_{2} concentration is inevitably linked to ocean acidification, consistent with the preferential extinction of heavily calcified taxa and other signals in the rock record that suggest a more acidic ocean, such as a carbonate production crisis that occurred a few thousand years after volcanic greenhouse gas emissions began. The decrease in ocean pH is calculated to be up to 0.7 units. An extreme aragonite sea formed. Ocean acidification was most extreme at mid-latitudes, and the major marine transgression associated with the end-Permian extinction is believed to have devastated shallow shelf communities in conjunction with anoxia. Evidence from paralic facies spanning the Permian-Triassic boundary in western Guizhou and eastern Yunnan, however, shows a local marine transgression dominated by carbonate deposition, suggesting that ocean acidification did not occur across the entire globe and was likely limited to certain regions of the world's oceans. One study, published in Scientific Reports, concluded that widespread ocean acidification, if it did occur, was not intense enough to impede calcification and only occurred during the beginning of the extinction event. The relative success of many marine organisms that were very vulnerable to acidification has further been used to argue that acidification was not a major extinction contributor. The persistence of highly elevated carbon dioxide concentrations in the atmosphere and ocean during the Early Triassic would have impeded the recovery of biocalcifying organisms after the PTME.

Acidity generated by increased carbon dioxide concentrations in soil and by the dissolution of sulfur dioxide in rainwater was also a killing mechanism on land. The increasing acidification of rainwater caused increased soil erosion as a result of the increased acidity of forest soils, evidenced by the increased influx of terrestrially derived organic sediments found in marine sedimentary deposits during the end-Permian extinction. Further evidence of an increase in soil acidity comes from elevated Ba/Sr ratios in earliest Triassic soils. A positive feedback loop further enhancing and prolonging soil acidification may have resulted from the decline of infaunal invertebrates like tubificids and chironomids, which remove acid metabolites from the soil. The increased abundance of vermiculitic clays in Shansi, South China coinciding with the Permian-Triassic boundary strongly suggests a sharp drop in soil pH causally related to volcanogenic emissions of carbon dioxide and sulphur dioxide. Hopane anomalies have also been interpreted as evidence of acidic soils and peats. As with many other environmental stressors, acidity on land episodically persisted well into the Triassic, stunting the recovery of terrestrial ecosystems.

=== Anoxia and euxinia ===
Evidence for widespread ocean anoxia (severe deficiency of oxygen) and euxinia (presence of hydrogen sulfide) is found from the Late Permian to the Early Triassic. Throughout most of the Tethys and Panthalassic Oceans, evidence for anoxia appears at the extinction event, including small pyrite framboids, negative δ^{238}U excursions, negative δ^{15}N excursions, positive δ^{82/78}Se isotope excursions, relatively positive δ^{13}C ratios in polycyclic aromatic hydrocarbons, high Th/U ratios, positive Ce/Ce* anomalies, depletions of molybdenum, uranium, and vanadium from seawater, and fine laminations in sediments. However, evidence for anoxia precedes the extinction at some other sites, including Spiti, India, Shangsi, China, Meishan, China, Opal Creek, Alberta, and Kap Stosch, Greenland. Biogeochemical evidence also points to the presence of euxinia during the PTME. Biomarkers for green sulfur bacteria, such as isorenieratane, the diagenetic product of isorenieratene, are widely used as indicators of photic zone euxinia because green sulfur bacteria require both sunlight and hydrogen sulfide to survive. Their abundance in sediments from the P–T boundary indicates that euxinic conditions were present even in the shallow waters of the photic zone. Negative mercury isotope excursions further bolster evidence for extensive euxinia during the PTME. The disproportionate extinction of high-latitude marine species provides further evidence for oxygen depletion as a killing mechanism; low-latitude species living in warmer, less oxygenated waters are naturally better adapted to lower levels of oxygen and are able to migrate to higher latitudes during periods of global warming, whereas high-latitude organisms are unable to escape from warming, hypoxic waters at the poles. Evidence of a lag between volcanic mercury inputs and biotic turnovers provides further support for anoxia and euxinia as the key killing mechanism, because extinctions would be expected to be synchronous with volcanic mercury discharge if volcanism and hypercapnia were the primary drivers of extinction. The sequence of extinctions in some sections, with deep water organisms being affected first followed by shallow water and then by bottom water organisms, is believed to reflect the migration of oxygen minimum zones. Models of ocean chemistry suggest that anoxia and euxinia were closely associated with hypercapnia. This suggests that poisoning from hydrogen sulfide, anoxia, and hypercapnia acted together as a killing mechanism. Hypercapnia best explains the selectivity of the extinction, but anoxia and euxinia likely contributed to the event's high mortality.

The sequence of events leading to anoxic oceans may have been triggered by carbon dioxide emissions from the eruption of the Siberian Traps. In that scenario, warming from the enhanced greenhouse effect would reduce the solubility of oxygen in seawater, causing the concentration of oxygen to decline. Increased coastal evaporation would have caused the formation of warm, saline bottom water (WSBW) depleted in oxygen and nutrients, which would have spread worldwide through the deep oceans. The influx of WSBW caused thermal expansion of water, raising sea levels and bringing anoxic waters onto shallow shelves, thereby enhancing the formation of WSBW in a positive feedback loop. The flux of terrigeneous material into the oceans increased as a result of soil erosion, which would have facilitated increased eutrophication; marine regression likewise enhanced terrigeneous material inputs. Increased chemical weathering of the continents due to warming and the acceleration of the water cycle would increase the riverine flux of nutrients to the ocean. Additionally, the Siberian Traps directly fertilised the oceans with iron and phosphorus as well, triggering bioblooms and marine snowstorms. Increased phosphate levels would have supported greater primary productivity in the surface oceans. The increase in organic matter production would have caused more organic matter to sink into the deep ocean, where its respiration would further decrease oxygen concentrations. Once anoxia became established, it would have been sustained by a positive feedback loop because deep water anoxia tends to increase the recycling efficiency of phosphate, leading to even higher productivity. Along the Panthalassan coast of South China, oxygen decline was also driven by large-scale upwelling of deep water enriched in various nutrients, causing this region of the ocean to be hit by especially severe anoxia. Convective overturn helped facilitate the expansion of anoxia throughout the water column. A severe anoxic event at the end of the Permian would have allowed sulfate-reducing bacteria to thrive, causing the production of large amounts of hydrogen sulfide in the anoxic ocean, turning it euxinic. In some regions, anoxia briefly disappeared when transient cold snaps resulting from volcanic sulphur emissions occurred.

The persistence of anoxia through the Early Triassic may explain the slow recovery of marine life and low levels of biodiversity after the extinction, particularly that of benthic organisms, because the return of stable oxic conditions correlated with biotic recoveries in many regions. Anoxia disappeared from shallow waters more rapidly than the deep ocean. Reexpansions of oxygen-minimum zones did not cease until the late Spathian, periodically setting back and restarting the biotic recovery process. The decline in continental weathering towards the end of the Spathian at last began ameliorating marine life from recurrent anoxia. In some regions of Panthalassa, pelagic zone anoxia continued to recur as late as the Anisian, probably due to increased productivity and a return of aeolian upwelling. Some sections show a rather quick return to oxic water column conditions, however, so for how long anoxia persisted remains debated. The volatility of the Early Triassic sulphur cycle suggests marine life continued to face returns of euxinia as well.

Some scientists have challenged the anoxia hypothesis on the grounds that long-lasting anoxic conditions could not have been supported if Late Permian thermohaline ocean circulation conformed to the "thermal mode" characterised by cooling at high latitudes. Anoxia may have persisted under a "haline mode" in which circulation was driven by subtropical evaporation, although the "haline mode" is highly unstable and was unlikely to have represented Late Permian oceanic circulation.

Oxygen depletion from extensive microbial blooms also contributed to the biological collapse of both marine and freshwater ecosystems. A persistent lack of oxygen following the extinction event itself delayed biotic recovery for much of the Early Triassic epoch.

=== Aridification ===
Increasing continental aridity, a trend well underway even before the PTME as a result of the coalescence of the supercontinent Pangaea, was drastically exacerbated by terminal Permian volcanism and global warming. The combination of global warming and drying generated an increased incidence of wildfires. Tropical coastal swamp floras such as those in South China may have been very detrimentally impacted by the increase in wildfires, though it is ultimately unclear if an increase in wildfires played a role in driving taxa to extinction.

Aridification trends varied widely in their tempo and regional impact. Analysis of fossil river deposits on the floodplains of the Karoo Basin indicates a shift from meandering to braided river patterns, suggesting a very abrupt drying of the climate. The climate change may have taken as little as 100,000 years, prompting the extinction of the unique Glossopteris flora and its associated herbivores, followed by the carnivorous guild. A pattern of aridity-induced extinctions that progressively ascended the food chain has been deduced from Karoo Basin biostratigraphy. Evidence for aridification in the Karoo across the Permian-Triassic boundary is not, however, universal, as some palaeosol evidence indicates a wettening of the local climate during the transition between the two geologic periods. Evidence from the Sydney Basin of eastern Australia, on the other hand, suggests that the expansion of semi-arid and arid climatic belts across Pangaea was not immediate but was instead a gradual, prolonged process. Apart from the disappearance of peatlands, there was little evidence of significant sedimentological changes in depositional style across the Permian-Triassic boundary. Instead, a modest shift to amplified seasonality and hotter summers is suggested by palaeoclimatological models based on weathering proxies from the region's Late Permian and Early Triassic deposits. In the Kuznetsk Basin of southwestern Siberia, an increase in aridity led to the demise of the humid-adapted Cordaites forests in the region a few hundred thousand years before the Permian-Triassic boundary. Drying of this basin has been attributed to a broader poleward shift of drier, more arid climates during the late Changhsingian, preceding the more abrupt main phase of the extinction at the Permian-Triassic boundary, which disproportionately affected tropical and subtropical species.

The persistence of hyperaridity also varied regionally. In the North China Basin, highly arid climatic conditions are recorded during the latest Permian, near the Permian-Triassic boundary, with a swing towards increased precipitation during the Early Triassic, the latter likely assisting biotic recovery following the mass extinction. Elsewhere, such as in the Karoo Basin, episodes of dry climate recurred regularly in the Early Triassic, with profound effects on terrestrial tetrapods.

The types and diversity of ichnofossils in a locality have been used as indicators of aridity. Nurra, an ichnofossil site on the island of Sardinia, shows evidence of major drought-related stress among crustaceans. Whereas the Permian subnetwork at Nurra displays extensive horizontal backfilled traces and high ichnodiversity, the Early Triassic subnetwork is characterised by an absence of backfilled traces, an ichnological sign of aridification.

=== Ozone depletion ===
A collapse of the atmospheric ozone shield has been invoked as an explanation for the mass extinction, particularly that of terrestrial plants. Ozone production may have been reduced by 60–70%, increasing the flux of ultraviolet radiation by 400% at equatorial latitudes and 5,000% at polar latitudes. The hypothesis has the advantage of explaining the mass extinction of plants, which would have added to the methane levels and should otherwise have thrived in an atmosphere with a high level of carbon dioxide. Fossil spores from the end-Permian further support the theory; many spores show deformities that could have been caused by ultraviolet radiation, which would have been more intense after hydrogen sulfide emissions weakened the ozone layer. Malformed plant spores from the time of the extinction event show an increase in ultraviolet B absorbing compounds, confirming that increased ultraviolet radiation played a role in the environmental catastrophe and excluding other possible causes of mutagenesis, such as heavy metal toxicity, in these mutated spores. Extremely positive Δ^{33}S anomalies provide evidence of photolysis of volcanic SO_{2}, indicating increased ultraviolet radiation flux. Sulphur isotope data from North China are inconsistent with a total collapse of the ozone layer, however, suggesting it may have not been as major a kill mechanism as others.

Multiple mechanisms could have reduced the ozone shield and rendered it ineffective. Computer modelling shows that high atmospheric methane levels are associated with a decline in the ozone shield and may have contributed to its reduction during the PTME. Volcanic emissions of sulphate aerosols into the stratosphere would have dealt significant destruction to the ozone layer. As mentioned previously, the rocks in the region where the Siberian Traps were emplaced are extremely rich in halogens. The intrusion of Siberian Traps volcanism into deposits rich in organohalogens, such as methyl bromide and methyl chloride, would have been another source of ozone destruction. An uptick in wildfires, a natural source of methyl chloride, would have had further deleterious effects still on the atmospheric ozone shield. Upwelling of euxinic water may have released massive hydrogen sulphide emissions into the atmosphere and would poison terrestrial plants and animals and severely weaken the ozone layer, exposing much of the life that remained to fatal levels of UV radiation, although other modelling work has found that the release of this gas would not have significantly damaged the ozone layer. Indeed, biomarker evidence for anaerobic photosynthesis by Chlorobiaceae (green sulfur bacteria) from the Late-Permian into the Early Triassic indicates that hydrogen sulphide did upwell into shallow waters because these bacteria are restricted to the photic zone and use sulfide as an electron donor.

=== Asteroid impact ===
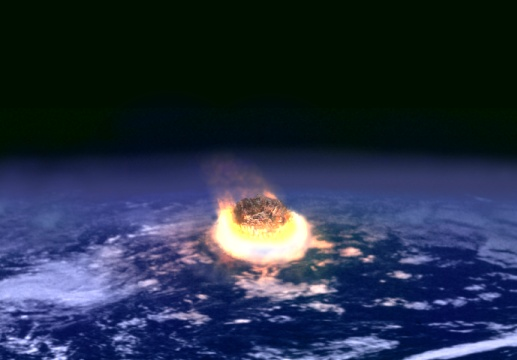
Artist's impression of a major impact event: A collision between Earth and an asteroid a few kilometers in diameter would release as much energy as the detonation of several million nuclear weapons.

Evidence that an impact event may have caused the Cretaceous–Paleogene extinction has led to speculation that similar impacts may have been the cause of other extinction events, including the P–Tr extinction, and thus to a search for evidence of impacts at the times of other extinctions, such as large impact craters of the appropriate age. However, suggestions that an asteroid impact was the trigger of the Permian-Triassic extinction are now largely rejected.

Reported evidence for an impact event from the P–Tr boundary level includes rare grains of shocked quartz in Australia and Antarctica; fullerenes trapping extraterrestrial noble gases; meteorite fragments in Antarctica; and grains rich in iron, nickel, and silicon, which an impact may have created. However, the accuracy of most of these claims has been challenged. For example, quartz from Graphite Peak in Antarctica, once considered "shocked", has been re-examined by optical and transmission electron microscopy. The observed features were concluded to be due not to shock, but rather to plastic deformation, consistent with formation in a tectonic environment such as volcanism. Iridium levels in many sites straddling the Permian-Triassic boundaries are not anomalous, providing evidence against an extraterrestrial impact as the cause of the PTME.

An impact crater on the seafloor would be evidence of a possible cause of the P–Tr extinction, but such a crater would by now have disappeared. As 70% of the Earth's surface is currently sea, an asteroid or comet fragment is now perhaps more than twice as likely to hit the ocean as it is to hit land. However, Earth's oldest ocean-floor crust is only 200 million years old as it is continually being destroyed and renewed by spreading and subduction. Furthermore, craters produced by very large impacts may be masked by extensive flood basalting from below after the crust is punctured or weakened. Yet, subduction should not be entirely accepted as an explanation for the lack of evidence: as with the K-T event, an ejecta blanket stratum rich in siderophilic elements (such as iridium) would be expected in formations from the time.

A large impact might have triggered other mechanisms of extinction described above, such as the Siberian Traps eruptions at either an impact site or the antipode of an impact site. The abruptness of an impact also explains why more species did not rapidly evolve to survive, as would be expected if the Permian–Triassic event had been slower and less global than a meteorite impact.

Bolide impact claims have been criticised on the grounds that they are unnecessary as explanations for the extinctions and do not fit the known data, which are compatible with a protracted extinction spanning thousands of years. Additionally, many sites spanning the Permian-Triassic boundary display a complete lack of evidence of an impact event.

==== Possible impact sites ====
Possible impact craters proposed as the site of an impact causing the P–Tr extinction include the 250 km (160 mi) Bedout structure off the northwest coast of Australia and the hypothesized 480 km (300 mi) Wilkes Land crater of East Antarctica. An impact has not been proved in either case, and the idea has been widely criticized. The Wilkes Land geophysical feature is of uncertain age, possibly postdating the Permian–Triassic extinction.

Another impact hypothesis postulates that the impact event that formed the Araguainha crater, whose formation has been dated to 254.7 ± 2.5 million, a possible temporal range overlapping with the end-Permian extinction, precipitated the mass extinction. The impact occurred around extensive deposits of oil shale in the shallow marine Paraná–Karoo Basin, whose perturbation by the seismicity resulting from impact likely discharged about 1.6 teratonnes of methane into Earth's atmosphere, buttressing the already rapid warming caused by hydrocarbon release due to the Siberian Traps. The large earthquakes generated by the impact would have additionally generated massive tsunamis across much of the globe. Despite this, most palaeontologists reject the impact as being a significant driver of the extinction, citing the relatively low energy (equivalent to 10^{5} to 10^{6} megatons of TNT, around two orders of magnitude lower than the impact energy believed to be required to induce mass extinctions) released by the impact.

A 2017 paper noted the discovery of a circular gravity anomaly near the Falkland Islands that might correspond to an impact crater with a diameter of 250 km (160 mi), as supported by seismic and magnetic evidence. Estimates of the structure's age range up to 250 million years. This would be substantially larger than the well-known 180 km (110 mi) Chicxulub impact crater associated with a later extinction. However, Dave McCarthy and colleagues from the British Geological Survey showed that the gravity anomaly is not circular and that the seismic data presented by Rocca, Rampino, and Baez Presser did not cross the proposed crater or provide any evidence for an impact crater.

=== Methanogens ===
A hypothesis published in 2014 posits that a genus of anaerobic methanogenic archaea known as Methanosarcina was responsible for the event. Three lines of evidence suggest that these microbes acquired a new metabolic pathway via gene transfer around that time, enabling them to metabolize acetate to methane efficiently. That would have led to their exponential reproduction, allowing them to rapidly consume vast deposits of organic carbon accumulated in marine sediments. The result would have been a sharp buildup of methane and carbon dioxide in the oceans and atmosphere, in a manner that may be consistent with the ^{13}C/^{12}C isotopic record. Massive volcanism facilitated this process by releasing large amounts of nickel, a scarce metal that serves as a cofactor for enzymes involved in methane production. Chemostratigraphic analysis of Permian-Triassic boundary sediments in Chaotian demonstrates that a methanogenic burst could be responsible for some percentage of the carbon isotopic fluctuations. On the other hand, in the canonical Meishan sections, the nickel concentration increases somewhat after the δ^{13}C concentrations have begun to fall.

=== Interstellar dust ===
John Gribbin argues that the Solar System last passed through a spiral arm of the Milky Way around 250 million years ago and that the resultant dusty gas clouds may have caused a dimming of the Sun, which combined with the effect of Pangaea could produce an ice age.

== Comparison to present global warming ==
The PTME has been compared to the current anthropogenic global warming situation and the Holocene extinction due to their shared characteristic of rapid carbon dioxide release. Though the current rate of greenhouse gas emissions is more than an order of magnitude greater than the rate measured over the course of the PTME, the discharge of greenhouse gases during the PTME is poorly constrained geo-chronologically and was most likely pulsed and constrained to a few key, short intervals, rather than continuously occurring at a constant rate for the whole extinction interval; the rate of carbon release within these intervals was likely to have been similar in timing to modern anthropogenic emissions. As they did during the PTME, oceans in the present day are experiencing drops in pH and in oxygen levels, prompting further comparisons between modern anthropogenic ecological conditions and the PTME. Another biocalcification event similar in its effects on modern marine ecosystems is predicted to occur if carbon dioxide levels continue to rise. The changes in plant-insect interactions resulting from the PTME have also been invoked as possible indicators of the world's future ecology. The similarities between the two extinction events have led to warnings from geologists about the urgent need for reducing carbon dioxide emissions if an event similar to the PTME is to be prevented from occurring.

Just as during the PTME, contemporary oceans are experiencing extreme change, in the form of declines in pH and oxygen levels, which further strengthens the link between the two events. This is emphasised by geologist Lee Kump:

The Permian-Triassic mass extinction provides a stark reminder of the consequences of rapid carbon dioxide emissions. During the PTME, volcanic activity unleashed massive amounts of CO₂, leading to ocean acidification, deoxygenation, and widespread ecological collapse. Today, we see human activities driving similar processes at an even faster rate. The geological record shows that once these tipping points are reached, the cascading effects on ecosystems can last for millions of years.

If it continues to rise, the consequence could be another bio-calcification crisis, as seems to have occurred in the fossil record, which would have disastrous consequences for modern marine ecosystems.

== See also ==
- Paleocene–Eocene Thermal Maximum
- Climate change
- List of possible impact structures on Earth
- Silurian hypothesis
