= Reduviasporonites =

Trace fossil classification
- Kingdom: Plantae
- Class: Zygnematophyceae
- Order: Zygnematales
- Ichnogenus: †Reduviasporonites; L.R.Wilson, 1962

Synonyms
- Chordecystia C.B.Foster, 1979; Tympanicysta B.E.Balme, 1980

Ichnogenus of plants

Reduviasporonites is an ichnogenus of palynomorphs. It was first described from specimens found in the Flowerpot Formation by L. R. Wilson in 1962. That first paper conjectured that they were a type of Penicillium fungus. Another analysis suggested that it might have been algal. It has been classified as phragmospores, having cell walls in a ladder-like formation.

It is of interest as possible evidence for a spike in fungal abundance associated with the Permian–Triassic extinction event.
