= Pioneer organism =

Organism that fills niches after disaster

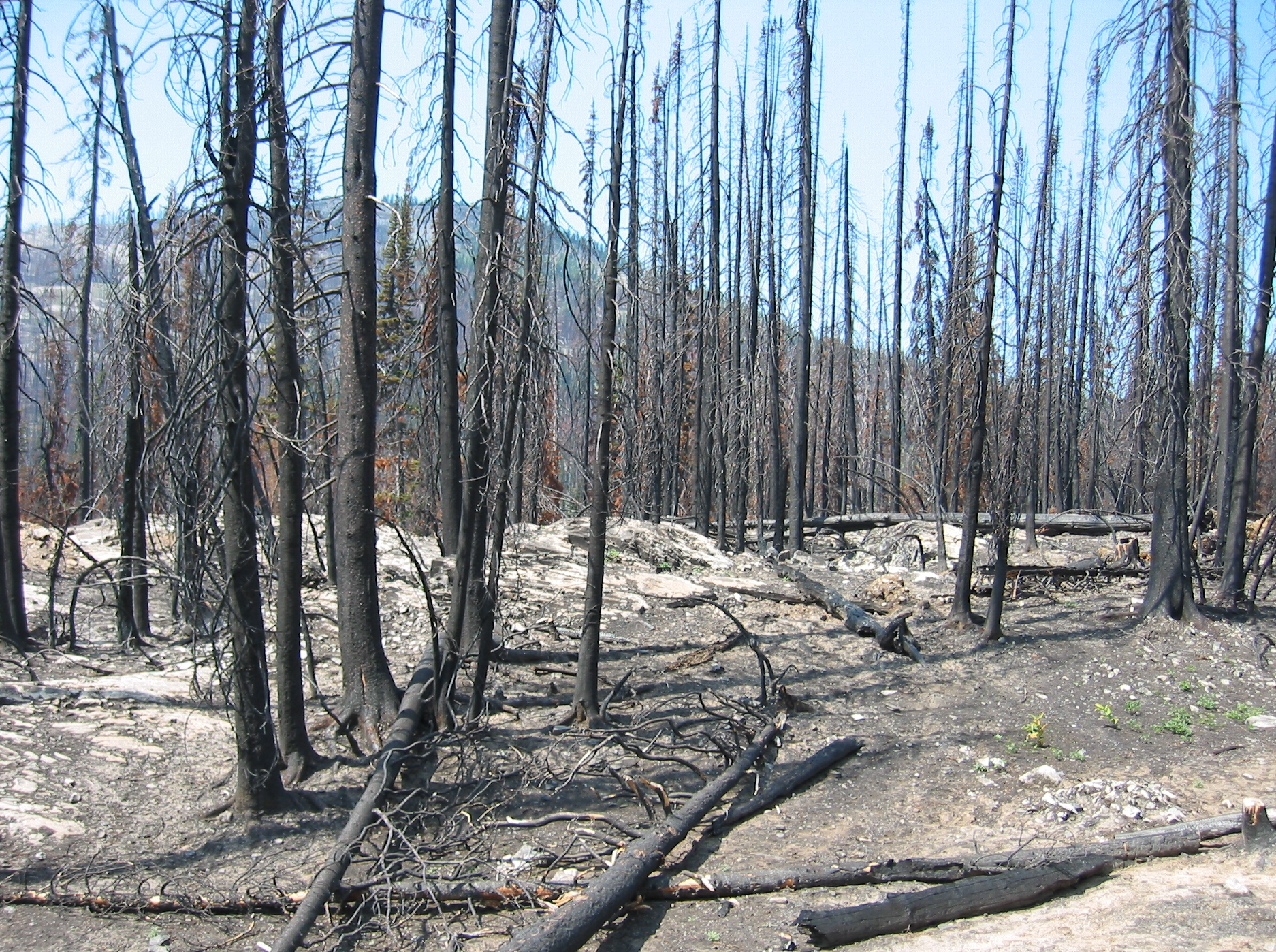
In the aftermath of a forest fire, pioneer organisms are among the first to colonize the area; visible at the right are pioneer plants which have begun growing in an area charred by fire.

A pioneer organism, also called a disaster taxon, is an organism that colonizes a previously empty area first, or one that repopulates vacant niches after a natural disaster, mass extinction or any other catastrophic event that wipes out most life of the prior biome. A group of such organisms capable of continued procreation among themselves are a pioneer species.

== Natural disaster ==
After a natural disaster, common pioneer organisms include lichens and algae. Mosses usually follow lichens in colonization but cannot serve as pioneer organisms. These common pioneer organisms can have a preference in the temperatures they are in. Lichens are more inclined to be in regions with more rainfall, whereas algae and mosses have a preference of being in regions with more humidity.

Pioneer organisms modify their environment and establish conditions that accommodate other organisms. In some circumstances, other organisms can be considered pioneer organisms. Birds are usually the first to inhabit newly-created islands, and seeds, such as the coconut, may also be the first arrivals on barren soil.

== Extinction event ==
Since the resolution of the fossil record is low, pioneer organisms are often identified as those that lived within hundreds, thousands, or a million years of the extinction event. For example, after the Permian–Triassic extinction event 252 million years ago, Lystrosaurus, a tusked therapsid, was considered a disaster taxon.

== See also ==
- Ecological succession
- Primary succession
- Secondary succession
