= Álvaro Penteado Crósta =

Brazilian geologist

Alvaro Penteado Crósta
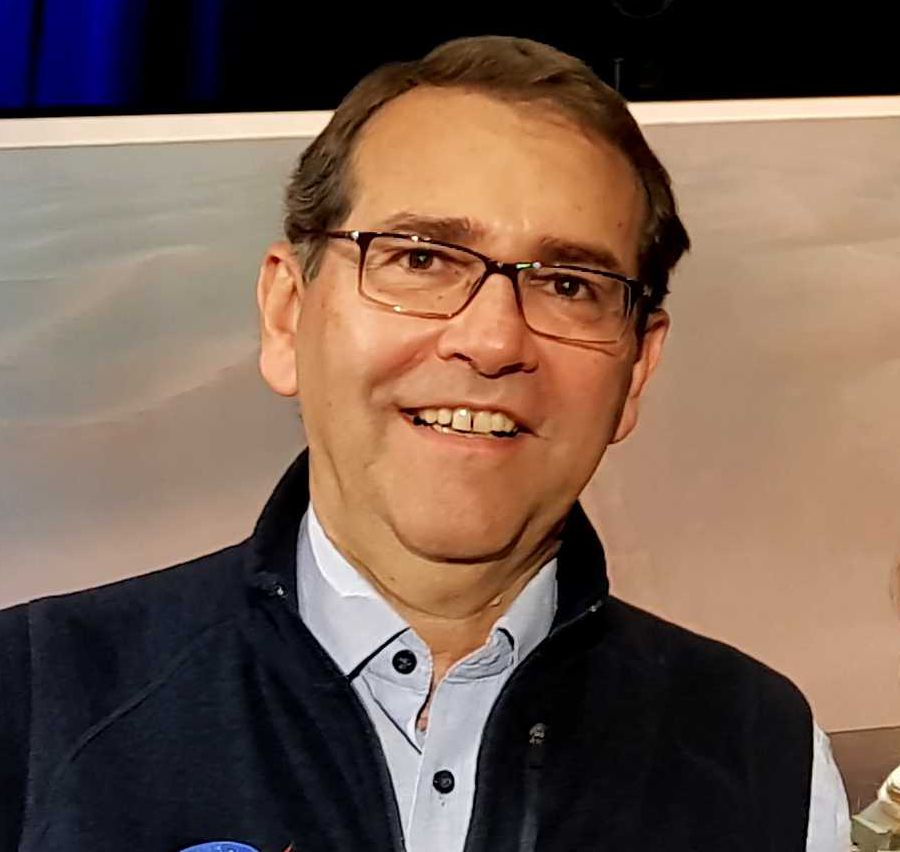
- Education: University of São Paulo; National Institute for Space Research; Imperial College London

Alvaro Penteado Crósta, born in 1954, is a Brazilian geologist, with international expertise in remote sensing, mineral exploration and planetary geology. He is an authority on the impact structures of Brazil and South America in general, and also known for the Crosta Technique, used in mineral exploration for detecting evidence of base and precious metals mineralization through multispectral and hyperspectral remote sensing images .

Crósta got a Bachelor's degree in geology from the University of São Paulo in 1977, a Master's degree from Brazil's National Institute for Space Research (INPE) in 1982, and a Ph.D. degree from the Imperial College London in 1990. In 1995—1996 he was a visiting scholar at the Desert Research Institute of the University of Nevada at Reno. In 2010 he acted as a visiting scientist at the Natural History Museum, Berlin, Germany, and at the University of Vienna, Austria. In 2018 he was a visiting scholar at the Universidad de los Andes, Bogotá, Colombia and in 2018/2019 a visiting scientist at the Jet Propulsion Laboratory, NASA/Caltech, Pasadena, CA, USA.

From 2005 to 2023 he was a Full Professor at the Geosciences Institute of the State University of Campinas (UNICAMP). He was the Institute's Director from 2005 to 2010 and UNICAMP´s Vice-Rector from 2013 to 2017. He retired in 2023 and, in 2026, was nominated Professor Emeritus of the State University of Campinas. He is a full Member of the Brazilian Academy of Sciences and a full Member of the Academy of Sciences of São Paulo State.

== Selected publications ==
- 1981 - Feições de Metamorfismo de Impacto no Domo de Araguainha (Impact Metamorphism in the Araguainha Dome), Revista Brasileira de Geociências, São Paulo, Brazil.
- 1992 – Processamento Digital de Imagens de Sensoriamento Remoto (Remote Sensing Image Processing), Campinas:IG/Unicamp
- 2006 - Characterizing surficial alteration at Los Menucos epithermal district, Patagonia, Argentina, using shortwave infrared spectrometry and ASTER multispectral images. Economic Geology. Society of Economic Geology.
- 2009 - Remote Sensing and Spectral Geology. Littleton, CO: Society of Economic Geologists.
- 2010 - T he first description and confirmation of the Vista Alegre impact structure in the Paraná flood basalts of southern Brazil. Meteoritics and Planetary Science, Wiley.
- 2011 - The Colônia structure, São Paulo, Brazil. Meteoritics and Planetary Science, Wiley.
- 2011 -The complex impact structure Serra da Cangalha, Tocantins State, Brazil. Meteoritics and Planetary Science, Wiley.
- 2012 - Geology and impact features of Vargeão Dome, southern Brazil. Meteoritics and Planetary Science, Wiley.
- 2013 - Geology and impact features of Riachão structure, northern Brazil. Meteoritics and Planetary Science, Wiley.
- 2014 - Shatter cones and planar deformation features confirm Santa Marta in Piauí State, Brazil, as an impact structure. Meteoritics and Planetary Science, Wiley.
- 2015 - the hydrothermal mineralogy of the Chapi Chiara gold prospect, Peru,|Unveiling the hydrothermal mineralogy of the Chapi Chiara gold prospect, Peru], through reflectance spectroscopy, geochemical and petrographic data. Ore Geology Reviews.
- 2018 - Impact cratering: The South American record-Parts 1 and 2. Geochemistry (Chemie der Erde). Elsevier.
- 2019 - Linking shock textures revealed by BSE, CL, and EBSD with U-Pb data (LA-ICP-MS and SIMS) from zircon from the Araguainha impact structure, Brazil. Meteoritics and Planetary Science, Wiley.
- 2019 - Shock deformation confirms the impact origin for the Cerro do Jarau, Rio Grande do Sul, Brazil, structure. Meteoritics and Planetary Science, Wiley.
- 2020 - Petrographic characterization of Archaean impact spherule layers from Fairview Gold Mine, northern Barberton Greenstone Belt, South Africa. Journal of African Earth Sciences. Elsevier.
- 2021 - Modeling the formation of Menrva impact crater on Titan: Implications for habitability. Icarus.
- 2022 - Nova Colinas, Maranhão State: A newly confirmed, complex impact structure in Brazil. Meteoritics and Planetary Science.
- 2023 - Elemental Characterization of Iron Meteorites Solely Based on LA-ICP-MS. ACS Earth Space Chemistry.
- 2024 - Magnetometric and seismic investigation of the Nova Colinas impact structure, Parnaíba Basin, Brazil. Journal of South American Earth Sciences.
- 2025 - Morphology and Sedimentary Structures of Medial-to-Distal Ejecta Reveal Debris-Flow Dynamics at the Chang'e-4 Landing Site. Journal of Geophysical Research: Planets.
- 2025 - Geology, gravity, and numerical modeling of the Nova Colinas impact structure, Parnaíba Basin, Brazil. Meteoritics & Planetary Science.
- 2026 - Confirming the impact origin of the São Miguel do Tapuio structure, northeastern Brazil. Meteoritics & Planetary Science.
- 2026 - Geraisite: The first tektite occurrence in Brazil
